= List of ancient Olympic victors =

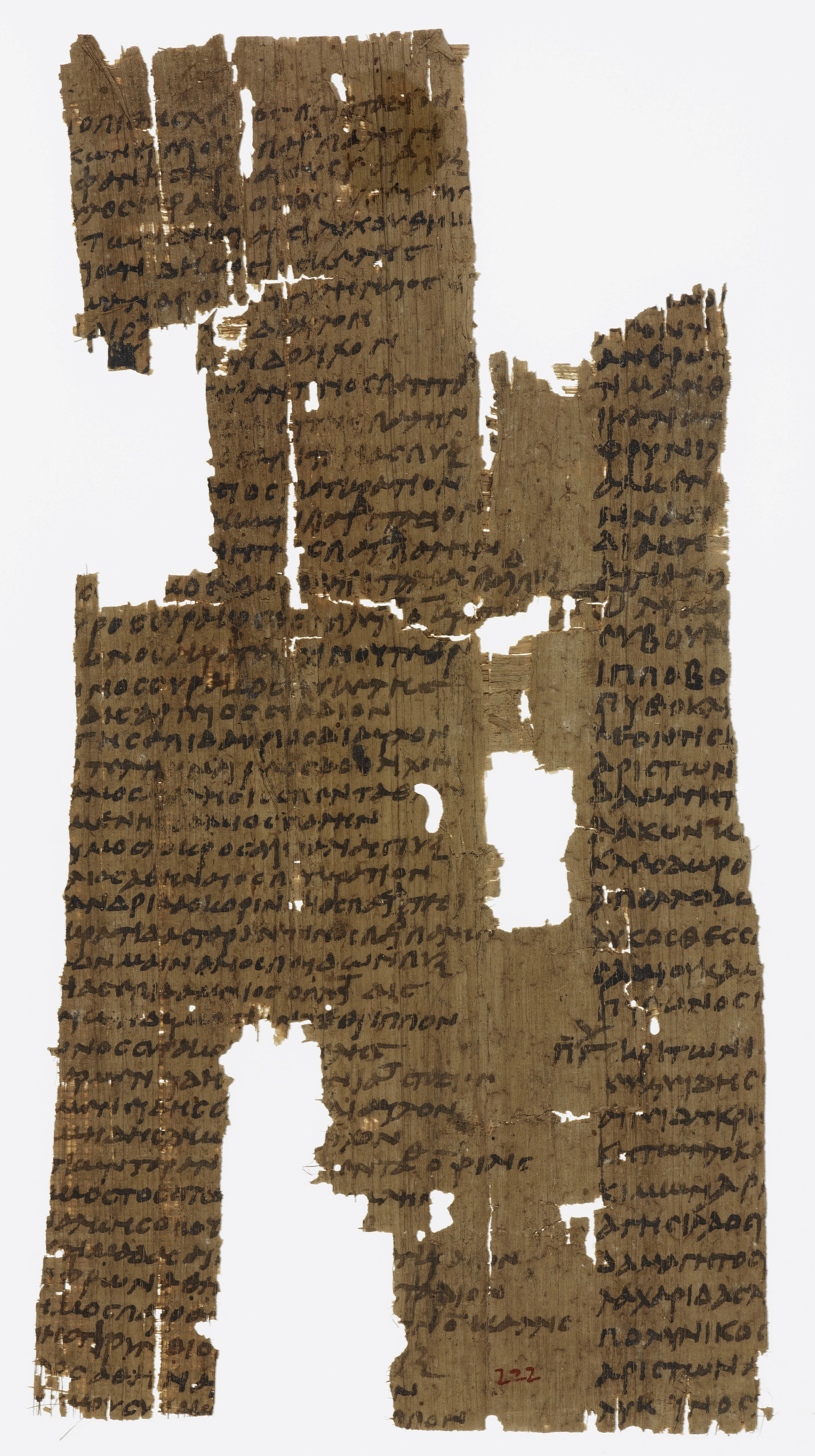
A papyrus list of Olympic victors, 3rd century A.D., British Library

The current list of ancient Olympic victors contains all of the known victors of the ancient Olympic Games from the 1st Games in 776 BC up to the 264th in 277 AD, as well as the games of 369 AD before their permanent disbandment in 393 by Roman emperor Theodosius I. It is based on available modern sources, as well as the older ones such as the writings of Pausanias (2nd century AD) and Chronicle of Eusebius (3rd century AD).

== Completeness ==
The complete number of sports that were carried out in each iteration of the Games is unknown, as is the number of victors that took part in these. Also, the correlation between victors and cities may not always be true, as it was not uncommon during antiquity for some ancient writers to make up or distort an olympic victor's city so that the given city would gain the glory and fame that accompanied an athlete's .

Up to the 2nd century BC and the beginning of 1st century BC, the athletes were Greek, as per the prerequisite for participating in the Games, however starting from the end of 1st century BC more and more Roman names appear as a consequence of the Roman rule in the Hellenic world. A measure of the level of uncertainty that exists today with regard to who the majority of the ancient Olympic victors were, is the approximation that from a total of more than 3,500 probable victors in different olympic sports during the ancient Olympic Games, only about 800 of them are known today.

Some women won horse and chariot races at the Olympic games; they were the owners of the horses and chariots: women victors on this list include Bilistiche, Euryleonis, Kasia Mnasithea, Kyniska, and Timareta.

== List ==
Olympiad	Year	Event	Victor	Victor's city and region/state	Sources
1 §	776 BC	Stadion	Koroibos	Elis	Eusebius
2 §	772 BC	Stadion	Antimachos	Dyspontium	Eusebius
3 §	768 BC	Stadion	Androklos	Messene	Eusebius
4 §	764 BC	Stadion	Polychares	Messene	Eusebius
5 §	760 BC	Stadion	Aischines	Elis	Eusebius
6 §	756 BC	Stadion	Oebotas	Dyme	Eusebius
7 §	752 BC	Stadion	Daikles	Messene	Eusebius
8 §	748 BC	Stadion	Antikles	Messene	Eusebius
9 §	744 BC	Stadion	Xenodokos (or Xenokles)	Messene	Eusebius
10 §	740 BC	Stadion	Dotades	Messene	Eusebius
11 §	736 BC	Stadion	Leochares	Messene	Eusebius
12 §	732 BC	Stadion	Oxythemis	Coroneia	Eusebius
13 §	728 BC	Stadion	Diokles	Corinth	Eusebius
14 §	724 BC	Stadion	Desmon (or Dasmon)	Corinth	Eusebius
14 §	724 BC	Diaulos	Hypenos	Elis	Eusebius
15 §	720 BC	Stadion	Orsippos	Megara	Eusebius
15 §	720 BC	Dolichos	Akanthos	Sparta	Eusebius
16 §	716 BC	Stadion	Pythagoras	Sparta	Eusebius
17 §	712 BC	Stadion	Polos	Epidauros	Eusebius
18 §	708 BC	Stadion	Tellis	Sikyon	Eusebius
18 §	708 BC	Pentathlon	Lampis	Sparta	Eusebius
18 §	708 BC	Wrestling	Eurybatos	Sparta	Eusebius
19 §	704 BC	Stadion	Menos	Megara	Eusebius
20 §	700 BC	Stadion	Atheradas	Sparta	Eusebius
21 §	696 BC	Stadion	Pantakles	Athens	Eusebius
22 §	692 BC	Diaulos	Pantakles	Athens	
22 §	692 BC	Stadion	Pantakles	Athens	Eusebius
23 §	688 BC	Stadion	Ikaros (or Ikarios)	Aigeira	Eusebius
23 §	688 BC	Boxing	Onomastos	Smyrna	Eusebius
24 §	684 BC	Dolichos	Phanas	Messene	
24 §	684 BC	Boxing	Onomastos	Smyrna	
24 §	684 BC	Stadion	Kleoptolemos	Sparta	Eusebius
25 §	680 BC	Stadion	Thalpis	Sparta	Eusebius
25 §	680 BC	Tethrippon	Pagondas (or Pagon)	Thebes	Pausanias, 5.8.7
26 §	676 BC	Pentathlon	Philombrotos	Sparta	Eusebius
26 §	676 BC	Stadion	Kallisthenes	Sparta	Eusebius
27 §	672 BC	Stadion	Eurybates (or Eurybotos or Eurybos)	Athens	Eusebius
27 §	672 BC	Boxing	Daippos	Crotone	
27 §	672 BC	Teams' Tethrippon	State Victory	Elis	
27 §	672 BC	Pentathlon	Philombrotos	Sparta	
28 §	668 BC	Boxing	Daippos	Crotone	
28 §	668 BC	Pentathlon	Philombrotos	Sparta	
28 §	668 BC	Stadion	Charmis	Sparta	Eusebius
29 §	664 BC	Diaulos	Chionis	Sparta	
29 §	664 BC	Stadion	Chionis	Sparta	Eusebius
30 §	660 BC	Diaulos	Chionis	Sparta	
30 §	660 BC	Stadion	Chionis	Sparta	Eusebius
31 §	656 BC	Diaulos	Chionis	Sparta	
31 §	656 BC	Stadion	Chionis	Sparta	Eusebius
32 §	652 BC	Boxing	Komaios	Megara	Eusebius
32 §	652 BC	Stadion	Kratinos	Megara	Eusebius
33 §	648 BC	Horse Race	Krauxidas (or Kraxilas)	Krannon	Eusebius
33 §	648 BC	Tethrippon	Myron	Sikyon	
33 §	648 BC	Stadion	Gylis (or Gygis)	Sparta	Eusebius
33 §	648 BC	Pankration	Lygdamis	Syracuse	Eusebius
34 §	644 BC	Stadion	Stomas	Athens	Eusebius
35 §	640 BC	Diaulos	Kylon	Athens	Eusebius
35 §	640 BC	Stadion	Sphairos	Sparta	Eusebius
36 §	636 BC	Pankration	Phrynon	Athens (Note: Eusebius lists Phrynon in this Olympiad, but the text is fragmentary and it is not clear what he won; Diogenes Laërtius says that he was a Pankratiast.)	
36 §	636 BC	Stadion	Arytamas	Sparta (Note: As restored by Christensen & Martirosova-Torlone 2006. Antigonus of Carystus quotes Hippys of Rhegion as listing Arytamas as the winner of the Stadion in this year.)	Eusebius
37 §	632 BC	Boys' Stadion	Polyneikes (or Polynikes)	Elis	Eusebius
37 §	632 BC	Boys' Wrestling	Hipposthenes	Sparta	Eusebius
37 §	632 BC	Stadion	Eurykleidas	Sparta	Eusebius
38 §	628 BC	Boys' Pentathlon (Note: Eusebius says this was the only Olympiad in which the Boys' Pentathlon was competed.)	Deutelides	Sparta	
38 §	628 BC	Stadion	Olyntheus	Sparta	Eusebius
39 §	624 BC	Stadion	Rhipsolaus	Sparta	Eusebius
39 §	624 BC	Wrestling	Hipposthenes	Sparta	Eusebius
40 §	620 BC	Stadion	Olyntheus	Sparta	Eusebius
40 §	620 BC	Wrestling	Hipposthenes	Sparta	Eusebius
41 §	616 BC	Wrestling	Hipposthenes	Sparta	Eusebius
41 §	616 BC	Boys' Boxing	Philotas	Sybaris	Eusebius
41 §	616 BC	Boys' Wrestling	Philytas	Sybaris	
41 §	616 BC	Stadion	Kleondas (or Kleonidas)	Thebes	Eusebius
42 §	612 BC	Stadion	Lycotas	Sparta	Eusebius
42 §	612 BC	Wrestling	Hipposthenes	Sparta	Eusebius
43 §	608 BC	Stadion	Kleon	Epidauros	Eusebius
43 §	608 BC	Wrestling	Hipposthenes	Sparta	Eusebius
44 §	604 BC	Boys' Wrestling	Hetoimokles	Sparta	
44 §	604 BC	Stadion	Gelon	Sparta	Eusebius
45 §	600 BC	Pentathlon	Oligaithidai (family)	Corinth	
45 §	600 BC	Unknown event	Oligaithidai (family)	Corinth	
45 §	600 BC	Stadion	Antikrates	Epidauros	Eusebius
45 §	600 BC	Wrestling	Hetoimokles	Sparta	
46 §	596 BC	Boys' Stadion	Polymestor	Miletos	
46 §	596 BC	Stadion	Chrysamaxos	Sparta	Eusebius
46 §	596 BC	Wrestling	Hetoimokles	Sparta	
47 §	592 BC	Tethrippon	Alkmaion	Athens	
47 §	592 BC	Stadion	Eurycles	Sparta	Eusebius
47 §	592 BC	Wrestling	Hetoimokles	Sparta	
48 §	588 BC	Stadion	Glaukias (or Glykon)	Crotone	Eusebius
48 §	588 BC	Unknown event	Unknown name	Larisa	
48 §	588 BC	Boxing	Pythagoras	Samos	
48 §	588 BC	Wrestling	Hetoimokles	Sparta	
48 §	588 BC	Special Event	Lenaios	Unknown location	
49 §	584 BC	Stadion	Lykinos	Crotone	Eusebius
50 §	580 BC	Stadion	Epitelidas	Sparta	Eusebius
51 §	576 BC	Stadion	Eratosthenes	Crotone	Eusebius
52 §	572 BC	Stadion	Agis	Elis	Eusebius
52 §	572 BC	Boxing	Euanthes	Kyzikos	
52 §	572 BC	Pankration	Arrichion	Phigaleia	
52 §	572 BC	Wrestling	Nikasylos	Rhodes	
52 §	572 BC	Tethrippon	Kleisthenes	Sikyon	
53 §	568 BC	Boxing	Tisandros	Naxos	
53 §	568 BC	Stadion	Hagnon	Peparethos	Eusebius
54 §	564 BC	Horse Race	Kallias	Athens	
54 §	564 BC	Tethrippon	Kallias	Athens	
54 §	564 BC	Stadion	Hippostratos	Crotone	Eusebius
54 §	564 BC	Boxing	Tisandros	Naxos	
54 §	564 BC	Pankration	Arricion	Phigaleia	
55 §	560 BC	Tethrippon	Miltiades	Athens	
55 §	560 BC	Horse Race	Pheidolas	Corinth	
55 §	560 BC	Stadion	Hippostratos	Crotone	Eusebius
55 §	560 BC	Boxing	Tisandros	Naxos	
56 §	556 BC	Boxing	Tisandros	Naxos	
56 §	556 BC	Stadion	Phaidros	Pharsalos	Eusebius
57 §	552 BC	Stadion	Ladromos	Sparta	Eusebius
58 §	548 BC	Stadion	Diognetos	Crotone	Eusebius
58 §	548 BC	Tethrippon	Euagoras	Sparta	
59 §	544 BC	Boxing	Praxidamas	Aegina	Pausanias, 6.18.7
59 §	544 BC	Stadion	Archilochos	Korkyra	Eusebius
59 §	544 BC	Tethrippon	Euagoras	Sparta	
60 §	540 BC	Boys' Boxing	Leokreon	Chios	
60 §	540 BC	Boys' Wrestling	Milon	Crotone	
60 §	540 BC	Stadion	Apellaeus	Elis	Eusebius
60 §	540 BC	Tethrippon	Euagoras	Sparta	
61 §	536 BC	Tethrippon	Kimon	Athens	
61 §	536 BC	Stadion	Agatharchos	Korkyra	Eusebius
61 §	536 BC	Pankration	Agatharchos	Opous	
62 §	532 BC	Tethrippon	Peisistratos	Athens	
62 §	532 BC	Stadion	Eryxidas	Chalcis	Eusebius
62 §	532 BC	Wrestling	Milon	Crotone	Eusebius
62 §	532 BC	Pankration	Eurymenes	Samos	
62 §	532 BC	Unknown event	Eurymenes	Samos	
63 §	528 BC	Tethrippon	Kimon	Athens	
63 §	528 BC	Wrestling	Milon	Crotone	
63 §	528 BC	Stadion	Parmenides	Kamarina	Eusebius
64 §	524 BC	Wrestling	Milon	Crotone	
64 §	524 BC	Stadion	Menandros	Thessaly	Eusebius
65 §	520 BC	Unknown event	Philippos	Crotone	
65 §	520 BC	Wrestling	Milon	Crotone	
65 §	520 BC	Hoplitodromos	Damaretos (or Demaretos)	Heraia	Eusebius
65 §	520 BC	Boxing	Glaukos	Karystos	
65 §	520 BC	Diaulos	Anochos	Taranto	
65 §	520 BC	Stadion	Anochos	Taranto	Eusebius
65 §	520 BC	Tethrippon	Unknown name	Thebes	
66 §	516 BC	Wrestling	Milon	Crotone	
66 §	516 BC	Pankration	Timasitheus	Delphi	
66 §	516 BC	Tethrippon	Kleosthenes	Epidamnos	
66 §	516 BC	Hoplitodromos	Damaretos	Heraia	
66 §	516 BC	Stadion	Ischyros	Himera	Eusebius
67 §	512 BC	Horse Race	Pheidolas	Corinth	
67 §	512 BC	Wrestling	Milon	Crotone	
67 §	512 BC	Pankration	Timasitheus	Delphi	
67 §	512 BC	Diaulos	Phanas	Pellene	
67 §	512 BC	Hoplitodromos	Phanas	Pellene	
67 §	512 BC	Stadion	Phanas	Pellene	Eusebius
68 §	508 BC	Horse Race	sons of Pheidolas	Corinth	
68 §	508 BC	Stadion	Isomachus (or Ischomachus)	Crotone	Eusebius
68 §	508 BC	Tethrippon	Pantaros	Gela	
68 §	508 BC	Hoplitodromos	Phrikias	Pelinna	
68 §	508 BC	Wrestling	Kalliteles	Sparta	
69 §	504 BC	Diaulos	Thessalos	Corinth	
69 §	504 BC	Stadion	Isomachus (or Ischomachus)	Crotone	Eusebius
69 §	504 BC	Boys' Stadion	Philon	Korkyra	
69 §	504 BC	Hoplitodromos	Phrikias	Pelinna	
69 §	504 BC	Tethrippon	Demaratus	Sparta	
69 §	504 BC	Unknown event	Titas	Unknown location	
70 §	500 BC	Boys' Stadion	Meneptolemos	Apollonia	
70 §	500 BC	Tethrippon	Callias II	Athens	
70 §	500 BC	Boxing	Philon	Korkyra	
70 §	500 BC	Boys' Boxing	Agametor	Mantineia	
70 §	500 BC	Stadion	Nikeas	Opous	Eusebius
70 §	500 BC	Pentathlon	Akmatidas	Sparta	
70 §	500 BC	Mule-cart race	Thersios	Thessaly	Pausanias, 5.9.1
71 §	496 BC	Horse Race	Empedokles	Agrigento	
71 §	496 BC	Wrestling	Exainetos	Agrigento	
71 §	496 BC	Tethrippon	Callias II	Athens	
71 §	496 BC	Stadion	Tisikrates	Crotone	Eusebius
71 §	496 BC	Race For Mares	Pataikos	Dyme	Pausanias, 5.9.1
71 §	496 BC	Boxing	Philon	Korkyra	
71 §	496 BC	Pankration	Hagias	Pharsalos	
72 §	492 BC	Pentathlon	Hieronymos	Andros	
72 §	492 BC	Boxing	Kleomedes	Astypalaia	
72 §	492 BC	Tethrippon	Callias II	Athens	
72 §	492 BC	Stadion	Tisikrates	Crotone	Eusebius
72 §	492 BC	Horse Race	Krokon	Eretria	
72 §	492 BC	Track Event	Hippokleas	Pelinna	
73 §	488 BC	Boxing	Diognetos	Crete	
73 §	488 BC	Diaulos	Astylos	Crotone	
73 §	488 BC	Stadion	Astylos	Crotone	Eusebius
73 §	488 BC	Boys' Boxing	Agiadas	Elis	
73 §	488 BC	Tethrippon	Gelon	Gela	
73 §	488 BC	Pentathlon	Euthykles	Locri	
73 §	488 BC	Boys' Stadion	Asopichus	Orchomenus	
73 §	488 BC	Track Event	Hippokleas	Pelinna	
74 §	484 BC	Diaulos	Astylos	Crotone	
74 §	484 BC	Stadion	Astylos	Crotone	Eusebius
74 §	484 BC	Hoplitodromos	Mnaseas	Cyrene	
74 §	484 BC	Pentathlon	Theopompos	Heraia	
74 §	484 BC	Boxing	Euthymos	Locri	
74 §	484 BC	Boys' Boxing	Epikradios	Mantineia	
74 §	484 BC	Pankration	Agias	Pharsalos	
74 §	484 BC	Wrestling	Telemachos	Pharsalos	
74 §	484 BC	Tethrippon	Polypeithes	Sparta	
74 §	484 BC	Dolichos	Dromeus	Stymphalia	
75 §	480 BC	Boys' Wrestling	[...]kon	Argos	P. Oxy. 222
75 §	480 BC	Horse Race	State Victory	Argos	P. Oxy. 222
75 §	480 BC	Boys' Stadion	Xenopithes	Chios	P. Oxy. 222
75 §	480 BC	Boys' Boxing	[...]phanes	Heraia	P. Oxy. 222
75 §	480 BC	Pentathlon	Theopompos	Heraia	
75 §	480 BC	Pankration	Dromeus	Mantineia	
75 §	480 BC	Mule-cart race	Anaxilas	Region	
75 §	480 BC	Dolichos	Dromeus	Stymphalia	
75 §	480 BC	Diaulos	Astylos	Syracuse	
75 §	480 BC	Hoplitodromos	Astylos	Syracuse	P. Oxy. 222
75 §	480 BC	Stadion	Astylos	Syracuse	Eusebius
75 §	480 BC	Boxing	Theagenes	Thasos	
75 §	480 BC	Tethrippon	Daitondas and Arsilochos	Thebes	P. Oxy. 222
76 §	476 BC	Boys' Wrestling	Theognetos	Aegina	P. Oxy. 222
76 §	476 BC	Tethrippon	Theron	Agrigento	P. Oxy. 222
76 §	476 BC	Diaulos	Dandis	Argos	P. Oxy. 222
76 §	476 BC	Boys' Boxing	Agesidamos	Locri	P. Oxy. 222
76 §	476 BC	Boxing	Euthymos	Locri	P. Oxy. 222
76 §	476 BC	Wrestling	Unknown name	Maroneia	P. Oxy. 222
76 §	476 BC	Stadion	Skamandros (or Skamandrios)	Mytilene	Eusebius
76 §	476 BC	Boys' Stadion	Unknown name	Sparta	P. Oxy. 222
76 §	476 BC	Dolichos	Unknown name	Sparta	P. Oxy. 222
76 §	476 BC	Hoplitodromos	Zopyros	Syracuse	P. Oxy. 222 has [----]uros of Syracuse
76 §	476 BC	Horse Race	Hieron	Syracuse	P. Oxy. 222
76 §	476 BC	Pentathlon	Unknown name	Taranto	P. Oxy. 222
76 §	476 BC	Pankration	Theagenes	Thasos	P. Oxy. 222
77 §	472 BC	Stadion	Dandis	Argos	Eusebius
77 §	472 BC	Tethrippon	State Victory	Argos	P. Oxy. 222
77 §	472 BC	Pankration	Callias	Athens	P. Oxy. 222
77 §	472 BC	Boys' Stadion	[...]sandridas	Corinth	P. Oxy. 222
77 §	472 BC	Hoplitodromos	[...]gias	Epidamnos	P. Oxy. 222
77 §	472 BC	Diaulos	[...]ges	Epidauros	P. Oxy. 222
77 §	472 BC	Dolichos	Ergoteles	Himera	P. Oxy. 222
77 §	472 BC	Boxing	Euthymos	Locri	P. Oxy. 222
77 §	472 BC	Boys' Boxing	Tellon	Mainalos	P. Oxy. 222
77 §	472 BC	Pentathlon	[...]amos	Miletos	P. Oxy. 222
77 §	472 BC	Wrestling	[...]menes	Samos	P. Oxy. 222
77 §	472 BC	Horse Race	Hieron	Syracuse	P. Oxy. 222
77 §	472 BC	Boys' Wrestling	[...]kratidas	Taranto	P. Oxy. 222
78 §	468 BC	Pankration	Epitimadas	Argos	P. Oxy. 222
78 §	468 BC	Boys' Stadion	Lykophron	Athens	P. Oxy. 222
78 §	468 BC	Hoplitodromos	[...]los	Athens	P. Oxy. 222
78 §	468 BC	Horse Race	Leophron	Athens	
78 §	468 BC	Boxing	Menalkes	Opous	P. Oxy. 222
78 §	468 BC	Wrestling	Epharmostos (or Eparmostos)	Opous	P. Oxy. 222
78 §	468 BC	Boys' Wrestling	[...]emos	Parrhasia	P. Oxy. 222
78 §	468 BC	Diaulos	Parmenides	Poseidonia	P. Oxy. 222
78 §	468 BC	Stadion	Parmenides	Poseidonia	Eusebius
78 §	468 BC	Dolichos	[...]medes	Sparta	P. Oxy. 222
78 §	468 BC	Mule-cart race	Agesias	Syracuse	
78 §	468 BC	Tethrippon		Syracuse	P. Oxy. 222
78 §	468 BC	Pentathlon	[...]tion	Taranto	P. Oxy. 222
78 §	468 BC	Boys' Boxing	[...]nes	Tiryns	P. Oxy. 222
79 §	464 BC	Boys' Wrestling	Pherias	Aegina	
79 §	464 BC	Pentathlon	Xenophon	Corinth	
79 §	464 BC	Stadion	Xenophon	Corinth	Eusebius
79 §	464 BC	Tethrippon	Kratisthenes	Cyrene	
79 §	464 BC	Dolichos	Ergoteles	Himera	
79 §	464 BC	Pankration	Ephotion (or Ephondion or Ephendion)	Mainalos	
79 §	464 BC	Boys' Boxing	Protolaos	Mantineia	
79 §	464 BC	Boys' Stadion	Pythagoras	Mantineia	
79 §	464 BC	Boxing	Diagoras	Rhodes	
79 §	464 BC	Horse Race	Echekratidas	Thessaly	
80 §	460 BC	Boys' Wrestling	Alkmedon	Aegina	
80 §	460 BC	Dolichos	Ladas	Argos	
80 §	460 BC	Pankration	Timodemos	Athens	
80 §	460 BC	Wrestling	Amesinas	Barke	Eusebius
80 §	460 BC	Tethrippon	Arkesilaos	Cyrene	
80 §	460 BC	Unknown event	Kordaphos	Lepreon	
80 §	460 BC	Boys' Boxing	Kyniskos	Mantineia	
80 §	460 BC	Boys' Stadion	Sostratos	Pellene	
80 §	460 BC	Stadion	Torymbas (or Toryllas or Torymnas)	Thessaly	Eusebius
81 §	456 BC	Boys' Wrestling	Phrynichos	Athens	
81 §	456 BC	Boys' Stadion	Ikadion	Crete	P. Oxy. 222 has "Ikaidion", polis unknown
81 §	456 BC	Hoplitodromos	Mnaseas	Cyrene	P. Oxy. 222
81 §	456 BC	Stadion	Polymnastos	Cyrene	Eusebius
81 §	456 BC	Mule-cart race	Psaumios	Kamarina	
81 §	456 BC	Pankration	Timanthes	Kleonai	P. Oxy. 222
81 §	456 BC	Boys' Boxing	Alkainetos	Lepreon	P. Oxy. 222
81 §	456 BC	Wrestling	Leontiskos	Messene in Sicily	P. Oxy. 222
81 §	456 BC	Horse Race	Aigias	Na[----]	P. Oxy. 222
81 §	456 BC	Boxing	Anthropos	Unknown location	P. Oxy. 222
81 §	456 BC	Pentathlon	[...]nomos	Unknown location	P. Oxy. 222
81 §	456 BC	Tethrippon	Diactorides	Unknown location	
82 §	452 BC	Boys' Stadion	Lachon	Chios	P. Oxy. 222
82 §	452 BC	Pentathlon	Pythokles	Elis	P. Oxy. 222
82 §	452 BC	Boxing	Ariston	Epidauros	
82 §	452 BC	Horse race	Python	I[----]	P. Oxy. 222
82 §	452 BC	Tethrippon	Psaumios	Kamarina	P. Oxy. 222
82 §	452 BC	Stadion	Lykos	Larisa	Eusebius
82 §	452 BC	Wrestling	Leontiskos	Messene in Sicily	P. Oxy. 222
82 §	452 BC	Pankration	Damagetos	Rhodes	P. Oxy. 222
82 §	452 BC	Hoplitodromos	Lykos	Thessaly	P. Oxy. 222
82 §	452 BC	Boys' Wrestling	Cleodoros	Unknown location	
82 §	452 BC	Diaulos	Euboulos	Unknown location	P. Oxy. 222
82 §	452 BC	Dolichos	Hippobotos	Unknown location	P. Oxy. 222
83 §	448 BC	Hoplitodromos	Lyceinos	[----]	P. Oxy. 222
83 §	448 BC	Boys' Boxing	Ariston	A[----]	P. Oxy. 222
83 §	448 BC	Boys' Stadion	Lacharidas	A[----]	P. Oxy. 222
83 §	448 BC	Wrestling	Cheimon	Argos	P. Oxy. 222
83 §	448 BC	Dolichos	Aigedas	Crete	P. Oxy. 222
83 §	448 BC	Stadion	Krison	Himera	Eusebius
83 §	448 BC	Pentathlon	Keton	Locri	P. Oxy. 222
83 §	448 BC	Boxing	Akousilaos	Rhodes	P. Oxy. 222
83 §	448 BC	Diaulos	Eucleides	Rhodes	P. Oxy. 222
83 §	448 BC	Pankration	Damagetos	Rhodes	P. Oxy. 222
83 §	448 BC	Tethrippon	Arkesilaos	Sparta	
83 §	448 BC	Boys' Wrestling	Polynikos	Thespiai	P. Oxy. 222
84 §	444 BC	Wrestling	Taurosthenes	Aegina	
84 §	444 BC	Boys' Boxing	Charmides	Elis	
84 §	444 BC	Stadion	Krison	Himera	Eusebius
84 §	444 BC	Boxing	Alkainetos	Lepreon	
84 §	444 BC	Tethrippon	Arkesilaos	Sparta	
84 §	444 BC	Pentathlon	Iccus	Taranto	
85 §	440 BC	Boys' Boxing	Gnathon	Dipaia	
85 §	440 BC	Wrestling	Theopompos II	Heraia	
85 §	440 BC	Stadion	Krison	Himera	Eusebius
85 §	440 BC	Tethrippon	Polycles	Sparta	
86 §	436 BC	Boys' Boxing	Philippos	Arkadia	
86 §	436 BC	Tethrippon	Megakles	Athens	
86 §	436 BC	Boys' Wrestling	Pantarkes	Elis	
86 §	436 BC	Wrestling	Theopompos II	Heraia	
86 §	436 BC	Stadion	Theopompos	Thessaly	Eusebius
87 §	432 BC	Stadion	Sophron	Ambrakia	Eusebius
87 §	432 BC	Boys' Wrestling	Lykinos	Elis	
87 §	432 BC	Pankration	Dorieus	Rhodes	
87 §	432 BC	Tethrippon	Lykinos	Sparta	
88 §	428 BC	Stadion	Symmachos	Messene in Sicily	Eusebius
88 §	428 BC	Pankration	Dorieus	Rhodes	
88 §	428 BC	Tethrippon	Alexandros	Sparta	
89 §	424 BC	Boys' Boxing	Hellanikos	Lepreon	
89 §	424 BC	Boxing	Kleomachos	Magnesia on the Maeander	
89 §	424 BC	Stadion	Symmachos	Messene in Sicily	Eusebius
89 §	424 BC	Pankration	Dorieus	Rhodes	
89 §	424 BC	Tethrippon	Leon	Sparta	
89 §	424 BC	Unknown event	Lakrates	Sparta	
90 §	420 BC	Dolichos	Aristeus	Argos	
90 §	420 BC	Boys' Wrestling	Amertas	Elis	
90 §	420 BC	Horse Race	Xenombrotos	Kos	
90 §	420 BC	Boys' Boxing	Theantos	Lepreon	
90 §	420 BC	Pankration	Androsthenes	Mainalos	
90 §	420 BC	Tethrippon		Sparta	Thucydides 5.50.4
90 §	420 BC	Stadion	Hyperbios	Syracuse	Eusebius
91 §	416 BC	Stadion	Exainetos	Agrigento	Eusebius
91 §	416 BC	Tethrippon	Alkibiades (Note: Diodorus (Bibliotheca 13.74–5) puts this victory in the 93rd Olympiad (408 BC); C. M. Bowra says that this dating is impossible and argues for the 91st Olympiad (416 BC) instead.)	Athens	C. M. Bowra, "Euripides' Epinician for Alcibiades"
91 §	416 BC	Boys' Wrestling	Nikostratos	Heraia	
91 §	416 BC	Pankration	Androsthenes	Mainalos	
91 §	416 BC	Unknown event	Lakrates	Sparta	
92 §	412 BC	Stadion	Exainetos	Agrigento	Eusebius
93 §	408 BC	Stadion	Eubatas (or Eubatos or Eubotas)	Cyrene	Eusebius
93 §	408 BC	Synoris	Euagoras	Elis	Eusebius
93 §	408 BC	Tethrippon	Archelaus I of Macedon	Macedonia	Solinus 9.16 Disputed as fictional
93 §	408 BC	Pankration	Polydamas	Skotoussa	Eusebius
94 §	404 BC	Synoris	Euagoras	Elis	
94 §	404 BC	Wrestling	Symmachos	Elis	
94 §	404 BC	Stadion	Krokinas of Larissa	Larisa	Eusebius
94 §	404 BC	Tethrippon	Archelaus I of Macedon	Macedonia	
94 §	404 BC	Pankration	Promachos	Pellene	
94 §	404 BC	Boxing	Eukles	Rhodes	
94 §	404 BC	Dolichos	Lasthenes	Thebes	
94 §	404 BC	Boys' Boxing	Peisir[rh]odos	Thourioi	
95 §	400 BC	Unknown event	Unknown name	Argos	
95 §	400 BC	Stadion	Minos	Athens	Eusebius
95 §	400 BC	Horse Race	Aisepos	Elis	
95 §	400 BC	Tethrippon	Timon	Elis	
95 §	400 BC	Boys' Boxing	Xenodikos	Kos	
95 §	400 BC	Pankration	Antiochos	Lepreon	
95 §	400 BC	Boys' Wrestling	Euthymenes	Mainalos	
95 §	400 BC	Boxing	Demarchos	Parrhasia	
95 §	400 BC	Wrestling	Baukis	Troizen	
96 §	396 BC	Boys' Stadion	Epichares	Athens	
96 §	396 BC	Wrestling	Unknown name	Corinth	
96 §	396 BC	Dolichos	[...]onios	Crete	P.Oxy.2381
96 §	396 BC	Boys' Wrestling	Archedamos	Elis	
96 §	396 BC	Heralds Contest	Krates	Elis	Eusebius
96 §	396 BC	Stadion	Eupolemos (or Eupolis)	Elis	Eusebius
96 §	396 BC	Trumpet Contest	Timaios	Elis	Eusebius
96 §	396 BC	Diaulos	Krokinas of Larissa	Larisa	P.Oxy.2381
96 §	396 BC	Boys' Boxing	Bykelos	Sikyon	
96 §	396 BC	Tethrippon	Kyniska (Woman)	Sparta	
97 §	392 BC	Boxing	Phormion	Halikarnassos	
97 §	392 BC	Boys' Stadion	Dikon	Kaulonia	
97 §	392 BC	Wrestling	Euthymenes	Mainalos	
97 §	392 BC	Boys' Boxing	Neolaidas	Pheneus	
97 §	392 BC	Tethrippon	Kyniska (Woman)	Sparta	
97 §	392 BC	Stadion	Unknown name	Terina	
98 §	388 BC	Stadion	Sosippos	Athens	Eusebius
98 §	388 BC	Tethrippon	Annikeris	Cyrene	
98 §	388 BC	Horse Race	Kleogenes	Elis	
98 §	388 BC	Wrestling	Aristodemos	Elis	Eusebius
98 §	388 BC	Boys' Boxing	Antipatros	Miletos	
98 §	388 BC	Boxing	Eupalos	Thessaly	
99 §	384 BC	Dolichos	Sotades	Crete	Pausanias, 6.18.6
99 §	384 BC	Pentathlon	Hysmon	Elis	
99 §	384 BC	Boys' Stadion	Lykinos	Heraia	
99 §	384 BC	Boys' Boxing	Alketos	Kleitor	
99 §	384 BC	Boxing	Damoxenidas	Mainalos	
99 §	384 BC	Wrestling	Narykidas	Phigaleia	
99 §	384 BC	Colts' Tethrippon	Eurybatos	Sparta	Eusebius
99 §	384 BC	Diaulos or Hoplitodromos	Dikon	Syracuse	
99 §	384 BC	Stadion	Dikon	Syracuse	Eusebius
99 §	384 BC	Unknown event	Dikon	Syracuse	
100 §	380 BC	Pankration	Xenophon	Aigai	
100 §	380 BC	Boys' Pankration	Aurelios Eukarpides	Athens	
100 §	380 BC	Boys' Boxing	Hippos	Elis	
100 §	380 BC	Boys' Stadion	Deinolochos	Elis	
100 §	380 BC	Dolichos	Sotades	Ephesos	
100 §	380 BC	Boxing	Unknown name	Samos	
100 §	380 BC	Stadion	Dionysodoros	Taranto	Eusebius
101 §	376 BC	Pankration	Stomios	Elis	
101 §	376 BC	Pentathlon	Stomios	Elis	
101 §	376 BC	Boys' Boxing	Kritodamos	Kleitor	
101 §	376 BC	Boxing	Labax	Lepreon	
101 §	376 BC	Stadion	Damon	Thourioi	Eusebius
102 §	372 BC	Foals' Tethrippon	Troilos	Elis	
102 §	372 BC	Synoris	Troilos	Elis	
102 §	372 BC	Boys' Boxing	Thersilochos	Korkyra	
102 §	372 BC	Boys' Wrestling	Xenokles	Mainalos	
102 §	372 BC	Unknown event	Unknown name	Methydria	
102 §	372 BC	Unknown event	Unknown name	Methydria	
102 §	372 BC	Stadion	Damon	Thourioi	Eusebius
103 §	368 BC	Stadion	Pythostratos	Athens	Eusebius
103 §	368 BC	Boxing	Aristion	Epidauros	
103 §	368 BC	Boys' Stadion	Damiskos	Messene	
103 §	368 BC	Synoris	Euryleonis	Sparta	
103 §	368 BC	Pankration	Xenarkes	Stratos	
104 §	364 BC	Stadion (Note: The Greek text of Eusebius says that Phokides won the Wrestling; the Armenian text of Eusebius agrees with Diodorus that Phokides won the Stadion.)	Phokides	Athens	Eusebius
104 §	364 BC	Tethrippon	Eubatas	Cyrene	
104 §	364 BC	Heralds Contest	Archias	Hyblaia	
104 §	364 BC	Pankration	Sostratos	Sikyon	
105 §	360 BC	Boxing	Philammon	Athens	
105 §	360 BC	Stadion	Poros	Cyrene	Eusebius
105 §	360 BC	Tethrippon	Theochrestos 1	Cyrene	
105 §	360 BC	Heralds Contest	Archias	Hyblaia	
105 §	360 BC	Boys' Stadion	Xenon	Lepreon	
105 §	360 BC	Pankration	Sostratos	Sikyon	
105 §	360 BC	Boys' Wrestling	Agenor	Thebes	
106 §	356 BC	Dolichos	Pyrilampes	Ephesos	
106 §	356 BC	Heralds Contest	Archias	Hyblaia	
106 §	356 BC	Horse Race	Philip II of Macedon	Macedonia	
106 §	356 BC	Stadion	Poros	Malia	Eusebius
106 §	356 BC	Wrestling	Chairon	Pellene	
106 §	356 BC	Pankration	Sostratos	Sikyon	
107 §	352 BC	Synoris	Timokrates	Athens	
107 §	352 BC	Boys' Boxing	Athenaios	Ephesos	
107 §	352 BC	Tethrippon	Philip II of Macedon	Macedonia	
107 §	352 BC	Wrestling	Chairon	Pellene	
107 §	352 BC	Boxing	Skaios	Samos	
107 §	352 BC	Heralds Contest	Phorystas	Tanagra	
107 §	352 BC	Stadion	Smikrinas	Taranto	Eusebius
107 §	352 BC	Unknown event	Dionysodoros or Dionysodorus	Thebes	Arrian
108 §	348 BC	Stadion	Polykles	Cyrene	Eusebius
108 §	348 BC	Synoris	Philip II of Macedon	Macedonia	
108 §	348 BC	Wrestling	Chairon	Pellene	
108 §	348 BC	Boys' Wrestling	Aischylos	Thespiai	
109 §	344 BC	Stadion	Aristolochos	Athens	Eusebius
109 §	344 BC	Tethrippon	Arybbas	Epeiros	
109 §	344 BC	Hoplitodromos	Kallikrates	Magnesia on the Maeander	
109 §	344 BC	Boys' Boxing	Damaretos	Messene	
109 §	344 BC	Wrestling	Chairon	Pellene	
110 §	340 BC	Boys' Pankration	Aurelius	Athens	
110 §	340 BC	Stadion	Antikles	Athens	Eusebius
110 §	340 BC	Unknown event	Kalliades	Athens	
110 §	340 BC	Boxing	Asamon	Elis	
110 §	340 BC	Hoplitodromos	Kallikrates	Magnesia on the Maeander	
110 §	340 BC	Boys' Boxing	Telestas	Messene	
111 §	336 BC	Pankration	Dioxippos	Athens	
111 §	336 BC	Stadion	Kleomantis	Kleitor	Eusebius
111 §	336 BC	Boxing	Mys	Taranto	
111 §	336 BC	Boys' Pankration	Heliodoros	Thespiai	
112 §	332 BC	Pentathlon	Kallipos	Athens	
112 §	332 BC	Stadion	Grylos	Chalcis	Eusebius
112 §	332 BC	Boxing	Satyros	Elis	
112 §	332 BC	Wrestling	Cheilon	Patrai	
112 §	332 BC	Pankration	Heliodoros	Thespiai	
113 §	328 BC	Dolichos	Aegeus	Argos	Eusebius
113 §	328 BC	Equestrian Event	Demades	Athens	
113 §	328 BC	Boxing	Satyros	Elis	
113 §	328 BC	Stadion	Kliton	Macedonia	P.Oxy. 12 has "Criton"
113 §	328 BC	Trumpet Contest	Herodoros	Megara	
113 §	328 BC	Wrestling	Cheilon	Patrai	
114 §	324 BC	Hoplitodromos	Kriannios	Elis	
114 §	324 BC	Trumpet Contest	Herodoros	Megara	
114 §	324 BC	Pankration	Astyanax	Miletos	
114 §	324 BC	Stadion	Mikinas	Rhodes	Eusebius
114 §	324 BC	Boys' Boxing	Douris	Samos	
115 §	320 BC	Stadion	Damasias	Amphipolis	Eusebius
115 §	320 BC	Boys' Boxing	Pyttalos	Elis	
115 §	320 BC	Boys' Wrestling	Hermesianax	Kolophon	
115 §	320 BC	Trumpet Contest	Herodoros	Megara	
115 §	320 BC	Pankration	Astyanax	Miletos	
115 §	320 BC	Boys' Pankration	Markianos	Sardis	
116 §	316 BC	Boys' Boxing	Choirilos	Elis	
116 §	316 BC	Trumpet Contest	Herodoros	Megara	
116 §	316 BC	Pankration	Astyanax	Miletos	
116 §	316 BC	Stadion		Sparta	Eusebius
117 §	312 BC	Pankration	Aristophon	Athens	
117 §	312 BC	Pentathlon	Alexibios	Heraia	
117 §	312 BC	Trumpet Contest	Herodoros	Megara	
117 §	312 BC	Stadion	Parmenion	Mytilene	Eusebius
118 §	308 BC	Pankration	Antenor	Athens or Miletos	Eusebius
118 §	308 BC	Boys' Boxing	Theotimos	Elis	
118 §	308 BC	Horse Race	Nikagoras	Lindos	
118 §	308 BC	Synoris	Nikagoras	Lindos	
118 §	308 BC	Trumpet Contest	Herodoros	Megara	
118 §	308 BC	Wrestling	Seleadas	Sparta	
118 §	308 BC	Stadion	Apollonides	Tegea	Eusebius
119 §	304 BC	Stadion	Andromenes	Corinth	Eusebius
119 §	304 BC	Boys' Boxing	Kallon	Elis	
119 §	304 BC	Diaulos	Nikandros	Elis	
119 §	304 BC	Trumpet Contest	Herodoros	Megara	
119 §	304 BC	Boys' Stadion	Sophios	Messene	
119 §	304 BC	Pankration	Leontiskos	Messene	
119 §	304 BC	Tethrippon	Lampos	Philippoi	
120 §	300 BC	Pankration	Nikon	Anthedon	
120 §	300 BC	Wrestling	Keras	Argos	Eusebius
120 §	300 BC	Tethrippon	Theochrestos II	Cyrene	
120 §	300 BC	Boys' Boxing	Hippomachos	Elis	
120 §	300 BC	Boys' Stadion	Timosthenes	Elis	
120 §	300 BC	Diaulos	Nikandros	Elis	
120 §	300 BC	Hoplitodromos	Unknown name	Magnesia on the Maeander	
120 §	300 BC	Stadion	Pythagoras	Magnesia on the Maeander	Eusebius
120 §	300 BC	Heralds Contest	Herodoros	Megara	
120 §	300 BC	Trumpet Contest	Herodoros	Megara	
120 §	300 BC	Boxing	Archippos	Mytilene	
120 §	300 BC	Unknown event	Eublakes	Sparta	
121 §	296 BC	Diaulos	Apollonios	Alexandria	
121 §	296 BC	Foals' Tethrippon	Tlasimachos	Ambrakia	
121 §	296 BC	Synoris	Tlasimachos	Ambrakia	
121 §	296 BC	Pankration	Nikon	Anthedon	
121 §	296 BC	Dolichos	Pasichoros	Boiotia	
121 §	296 BC	Tethrippon	Archidamos	Elis	
121 §	296 BC	Boys' Boxing	Myrkeus	Kleitor	
121 §	296 BC	Hoplitodromos	Unknown name	Magnesia on the Maeander	
121 §	296 BC	Stadion	Pythagoras	Magnesia on the Maeander	Eusebius
121 §	296 BC	Pentathlon	Timachos	Mantineia	
121 §	296 BC	Trumpet Contest	Herodoros	Megara	
121 §	296 BC	Boys' Stadion	Antipatros	Miletos	
121 §	296 BC	Boxing	Kallippos	Rhodes	
121 §	296 BC	Wrestling	Amphiares	Sparta	
121 §	296 BC	Horse Race	Pandion	Thessaly	
121 §	296 BC	Boys' Wrestling	[So]siades	Tralles	Phlegon of Tralles
122 §	292 BC	Boys' Boxing	Philippos	Arkadia	
122 §	292 BC	Hoplitodromos	Eperastos	Elis	
122 §	292 BC	Tethrippon	Telemachos	Elis	
122 §	292 BC	Boys' Stadion	Herodotos	Klazomenai	
122 §	292 BC	Stadion	Antigonos	Macedonia	Eusebius
122 §	292 BC	Trumpet Contest	Herodoros	Megara	
123 §	288 BC	Aulos Competition	Pythokles	Hermione	
123 §	288 BC	Stadion	Antigonos	Macedonia	Eusebius
124 §	284 BC	Tethrippon	Ptolemy II Philadelphus	Alexandria	
124 §	284 BC	Stadion	Philomelos	Pharsalos	Eusebius
125 §	280 BC	Stadion	Ladas	Aigion	Eusebius
125 §	280 BC	Pankration	Hippon	Cyrene	Eusebius
125 §	280 BC	Diaulos	Paraballon	Elis	
126 §	276 BC	Stadion	Idaios	Cyrene	Eusebius
126 §	276 BC	Pentathlon	Unknown name	Elis	
126 §	276 BC	Foals' Tethrippon	Attalos	Pergamon	
127 §	272 BC	Boys' Wrestling	Kratinos	Aigeira	
127 §	272 BC	Colts' Tethrippon	Arsinoe II	Alexandria	
127 §	272 BC	Stadion	Perigenes	Alexandria	Eusebius
127 §	272 BC	Synoris	Arsinoe II	Alexandria	
127 §	272 BC	Tethrippon	Glaukon	Athens	
127 §	272 BC	Wrestling	Nikarchos	Elis	
128 §	268 BC	Boys' Wrestling	Alexinikos	Elis	
128 §	268 BC	Horse Race	Unknown name	Krannon	
128 §	268 BC	Foals' Tethrippon	Bilistiche	Macedonia	
128 §	268 BC	Stadion	Seleukos	Macedonia	Eusebius
128 §	268 BC	Synoris	Unknown name	Thessaly	
128 §	268 BC	Tethrippon	Karteros	Thessaly	
129 §	264 BC	Diaulos	Philinus	Kos	
129 §	264 BC	Stadion	Philinus	Kos	Eusebius
129 §	264 BC	Colts' Synoris	Bilistiche	Macedonia	Eusebius and Pausanias, 5.8.11.
129 §	264 BC	Synoris	Bilistiche	Macedonia	
130 §	260 BC	Diaulos	Philinus	Kos	
130 §	260 BC	Stadion	Philinus	Kos	Eusebius
131 §	256 BC	Stadion	Ammonios	Alexandria	Eusebius
131 §	256 BC	Boys' Wrestling	Eikasios or Icasios	Kolophon	
131 §	256 BC	Diaulos	Philinus	Kos	
131 §	256 BC	Foals' Race	Hippocrates	Thessaly	Eusebius
132 §	252 BC	Stadion	Xenophanes	Amphissa	Eusebius
132 §	252 BC	Pentathlon	Unknown name	Elis	
133 §	248 BC	Boys' Wrestling	Lastraditas	Elis	
133 §	248 BC	Unknown event	(…)s	Elis	
133 §	248 BC	Unknown event	Euryades	Elis	
133 §	248 BC	Wrestling	(…)s	Elis	
133 §	248 BC	Stadion	Symilos	Neapolis	Eusebius
134 §	244 BC	Wrestling	Unknown name	Epidauros	
134 §	244 BC	Stadion	Alkidas	Sparta	Eusebius
135 §	240 BC	Stadion	Eraton	Aitolia	Eusebius
135 §	240 BC	Boxing	Kleoxenos	Alexandria	Eusebius
135 §	240 BC	Boys' Wrestling	Euanoridas	Elis	
136 §	236 BC	Stadion	Pythocles	Sikyon	Eusebius
137 §	232 BC	Stadion	Menestheus	Barke	Eusebius
137 §	232 BC	Pentathlon	Gorgos	Messene	
137 §	232 BC	Tethrippon	Aratos	Sikyon	
138 §	228 BC	Stadion	Demetrios	Alexandria	Eusebius
138 §	228 BC	Horse Race	Pantarkes	Elis	
138 §	228 BC	Boys' Stadion	Emaution	Thelphoussa	
139 §	224 BC	Stadion	Iolaidas	Argos	Eusebius
140 §	220 BC	Pankration	Agesidamos	Messene	
140 §	220 BC	Unknown event	Unknown name	Nibis, Egypt	
140 §	220 BC	Stadion	Zopyros	Syracuse	Eusebius
141 §	216 BC	Foals' Race	Thrasonides	Elis	
141 §	216 BC	Wrestling	Paianios	Elis	
141 §	216 BC	Stadion	Dorotheos	Rhodes	Eusebius
141 §	216 BC	Pankration	Kleitomachos	Thebes	
142 §	212 BC	Stadion	Krates	Alexandria	Eusebius
142 §	212 BC	Pankration	Kapros	Elis	Eusebius
142 §	212 BC	Wrestling	Kapros	Elis	Eusebius
142 §	212 BC	Boxing	Kleitomachos	Thebes	
142 §	212 BC	Synoris	Akestorides	Troy	
142 §	212 BC	Unknown event	Akestorides	Troy	
143 §	208 BC	Diaulos	Unknown name	Argos	
143 §	208 BC	Stadion	Herklaitos	Samos	Eusebius
143 §	208 BC	Boys' Stadion	Damatrios	Tegea	
144 §	204 BC	Diaulos	Unknown name	Argos	
144 §	204 BC	Boys' Stadion	Sodamos	Assos	
144 §	204 BC	Stadion	Herakleides	Salamis in Cyprus	Eusebius
144 §	204 BC	Wrestling	Damokrates	Tenedos	
145 §	200 BC	Stadion	Pyrrhias	Aitolia	Eusebius
145 §	200 BC	Boys' Pankration	Phaidimos	Alexandria Troas	Eusebius
145 §	200 BC	Diaulos	Unknown name	Argos	
145 §	200 BC	Pentathlon	Timon	Elis	
145 §	200 BC	Boys' Boxing	Moschos	Kolophon	Eusebius
145 §	200 BC	Unknown event	Unknown name	Messene	
145 §	200 BC	Dolichos	Damatrios	Tegea	
146 §	196 BC	Diaulos	Unknown name	Argos	
146 §	196 BC	Stadion	Mikion	Boiotia	Eusebius
147 §	192 BC	Stadion	Agemachos	Kyzikos	Eusebius
147 §	192 BC	Wrestling	Kleitostratos	Rhodes	Eusebius
148 §	188 BC	Stadion	Arkesilaos	Megalopolis	Eusebius
149 §	184 BC	Boxing	Epitherses	Erythrai	
149 §	184 BC	Stadion	Hippostratos	Seleucia Pieria	Eusebius
150 §	180 BC	Boxing	Epitherses	Erythrai	
150 §	180 BC	Stadion	Onesikritos	Salamis	Eusebius
151 §	176 BC	Stadion	Thymilos	Aspendos	Eusebius
152 §	172 BC	Boys' Wrestling	Agesistratos	Lindos	
152 §	172 BC	Pankration	Hagesistratos	Lindos	
152 §	172 BC	Stadion	Demokritos	Megara	Eusebius
152 §	172 BC	Boys' Pankration	Diallos	Smyrna	
153 §	168 BC	Stadion	Aristandros	Antissa	Eusebius
154 §	164 BC	Boys' Wrestling	Lysippos	Elis	
154 §	164 BC	Diaulos	Leonidas	Rhodes	
154 §	164 BC	Hoplitodromos	Leonidas	Rhodes	
154 §	164 BC	Stadion	Leonidas	Rhodes	Eusebius
155 §	160 BC	Boxing	D[...]gonos	Rhodes	
155 §	160 BC	Diaulos	Leonidas	Rhodes	
155 §	160 BC	Hoplitodromos	Leonidas	Rhodes	
155 §	160 BC	Stadion	Leonidas	Rhodes	Eusebius
156 §	156 BC	Boys' Pankration	Amyntas	Eresos	
156 §	156 BC	Boxing	D[...]gonos	Rhodes	
156 §	156 BC	Diaulos	Leonidas	Rhodes	
156 §	156 BC	Hoplitodromos	Leonidas	Rhodes	
156 §	156 BC	Pankration	Aristomenes	Rhodes	Eusebius
156 §	156 BC	Stadion	Leonidas	Rhodes	Eusebius
156 §	156 BC	Wrestling	Aristomenes	Rhodes	Eusebius
157 §	152 BC	Diaulos	Leonidas	Rhodes	
157 §	152 BC	Hoplitodromos	Leonidas	Rhodes	
157 §	152 BC	Stadion	Leonidas	Rhodes	Eusebius
157 §	152 BC	Boys' Stadion	Apollodoros	Samos	
158 §	148 BC	Wrestling	Unknown name	Elis	
158 §	148 BC	Stadion	Orthon	Syracuse	Eusebius
159 §	144 BC	Stadion	Alkemos	Kyzikos	Eusebius
159 §	144 BC	Boxing	Xenothemis	Miletos	
160 §	140 BC	Stadion	Agnodorus	Kyzikos	Eusebius
161 §	136 BC	Stadion	Antipatros	Epeiros	Eusebius
162 §	132 BC	Wrestling	Menodoros Gnaeus	Athens	
162 §	132 BC	Stadion	Damon	Delphi	Eusebius
163 §	128 BC	Stadion	Timotheos	Tralles	Eusebius
164 §	124 BC	Stadion	Boiotos	Sikyon	Eusebius
165 §	120 BC	Stadion	Akousilaos	Cyrene	Eusebius
165 §	120 BC	Boxing	Agesarchos	Tritia	
166 §	116 BC	Stadion	Chrysogonos	Bithynia (Nikaia)	Eusebius
166 §	116 BC	Boys' Pankration	Publius Aelius Aristomachus	Magnesia on the Maeander	
167 §	112 BC	Stadion	Chrysogonos	Bithynia (Nikaia)	Eusebius
168 §	108 BC	Stadion	Nikomachos	Philadelphia	Eusebius
169 §	104 BC	Stadion	Nikodamos	Sparta	Eusebius
170 §	100 BC	Diaulos	Nikokles	Akrion in Laconia	
170 §	100 BC	Dolichos	Nikokles	Akrion in Laconia	
170 §	100 BC	Hoplitodromos	Nikokles	Akrion in Laconia	
170 §	100 BC	Heralds Contest	(…)obios	Delos	
170 §	100 BC	Chariot racing	Unknown name	Elis	
170 §	100 BC	Horse Race	Strogien	Elis	
170 §	100 BC	Stadion	Simmias	Seleucia on the Tigris	Eusebius
171 §	96 BC	Diaulos	Nikokles	Akrion in Laconia	
171 §	96 BC	Dolichos	Nikokles	Akrion in Laconia	
171 §	96 BC	Hoplitodromos	Nikokles	Akrion in Laconia	
171 §	96 BC	Foals' Synoris	Antigenes	Elis	
171 §	96 BC	Unknown event	Aristodamos	Elis	
171 §	96 BC	Stadion	Parmeniskos	Korkyra	Eusebius
172 §	92 BC	Stadion	Eudamos	Kos	Eusebius
172 §	92 BC	Pankration	Protophanes	Magnesia on the Maeander	Eusebius
172 §	92 BC	Wrestling	Protophanes	Magnesia on the Maeander	Eusebius
173 §	88 BC	Stadion	Parmeniskos	Korkyra	Eusebius
174 §	84 BC	Foals' Tethrippon	Theodota	Elis	
174 §	84 BC	Synoris	Philistos	Elis	
174 §	84 BC	Synoris	Timareta	Elis	
174 §	84 BC	Tethrippon	Praxagoras	Elis	
174 §	84 BC	Stadion	Demostratos	Larisa	Eusebius
175 §	80 BC	Stadion	N/A		Eusebius
175 §	80 BC	Boys' Stadion	Epainetos	Argos	
176 §	76 BC	Horse Race	Lasthenes	Elis	
176 §	76 BC	Tethrippon	Unknown name	Elis	
176 §	76 BC	Unknown event	Philonikos	Elis	
176 §	76 BC	Stadion	Dion	Kyparissia	Eusebius
177 §	72 BC	Boxing	Atyanas	Adramyttion	Phlegon, apud Photius, Bibliotheca 97
177 §	72 BC	Wrestling	Isidoros	Alexandria	Phlegon, apud Photius, Bibliotheca 97
177 §	72 BC	Boys' Stadion	Sosigenes	Asia Minor	Phlegon, apud Photius, Bibliotheca 97
177 §	72 BC	Boys' Boxing	Soterichos	Elis	Phlegon, apud Photius, Bibliotheca 97
177 §	72 BC	Boys' Pankration	Kalas	Elis	Phlegon, apud Photius, Bibliotheca 97
177 §	72 BC	Foals' Race	Kallippos	Elis	Phlegon, apud Photius, Bibliotheca 97
177 §	72 BC	Foals' Synoris	Kletias	Elis	Phlegon, apud Photius, Bibliotheca 97
177 §	72 BC	Foals' Tethrippon	Hellanikos	Elis	Phlegon, apud Photius, Bibliotheca 97
177 §	72 BC	Horse Race	Hegemon	Elis	Phlegon, apud Photius, Bibliotheca 97
177 §	72 BC	Synoris	Hellanikos	Elis	Phlegon, apud Photius, Bibliotheca 97
177 §	72 BC	Tethrippon	Aristolochos	Elis	Phlegon, apud Photius, Bibliotheca 97
177 §	72 BC	Pentathlon	Aristonymidas	Kos	Phlegon, apud Photius, Bibliotheca 97
177 §	72 BC	Boys' Wrestling	Apollonias	Kyparissia	Phlegon, apud Photius, Bibliotheca 97
177 §	72 BC	Diaulos	Hekatomnos	Miletos	Phlegon, apud Photius, Bibliotheca 97
177 §	72 BC	Hoplitodromos	Hekatomnos	Miletos	Phlegon, apud Photius, Bibliotheca 97
177 §	72 BC	Stadion	Hekatomnos	Miletos	Eusebius
177 §	72 BC	Dolichos (Note: Photius quotes Phlegon as listing both Hypsikles and Gaius as winners of the Dolichos in the 177th Olympiad.)	Gaius	Rome	Phlegon, apud Photius, Bibliotheca 97
177 §	72 BC	Dolichos	Hypsikles	Sikyon	Phlegon, apud Photius, Bibliotheca 97
177 §	72 BC	Pankration	Sphodrias	Sikyon	Phlegon, apud Photius, Bibliotheca 97
178 §	68 BC	Pankration	Straton (or Stratonikos)	Alexandria	Eusebius
178 §	68 BC	Wrestling	Straton (or Stratonikos)	Alexandria	Eusebius
178 §	68 BC	Stadion	Diokles	Hypaipa	Eusebius
179 §	64 BC	Pankration	Straton (or Stratonikos)	Alexandria	
179 §	64 BC	Wrestling	Straton (or Stratonikos)	Alexandria	
179 §	64 BC	Stadion	Andreas	Sparta	Eusebius
180 §	60 BC	Stadion	Andromachos	Ambrakia	Eusebius
180 §	60 BC	Synoris	Menedemos	Elis	
181 §	56 BC	Equestrian Event for Foals	Charopas	Elis	
181 §	56 BC	Stadion	Lamachos	Tauromenion	Eusebius
182 §	52 BC	Pankration	Marion	Alexandria	Eusebius
182 §	52 BC	Wrestling	Marion	Alexandria	Eusebius
182 §	52 BC	Stadion	Anthestion	Argos	Eusebius
182 §	52 BC	Equestrian Event for Foals	Agelochos	Elis	
183 §	48 BC	Pentathlon	Unknown name	Elis	
183 §	48 BC	Tethrippon or Synoris for Foals	[....]chos	Elis	
183 §	48 BC	Unknown event	Unknown name	Elis	
183 §	48 BC	Stadion	Theodoros	Messene	Eusebius
183 §	48 BC	Wrestling	Leon	Rhodes	
184 §	44 BC	Stadion	Theodoros	Messene	Eusebius
185 §	40 BC	Boys' Boxing	Thaliarchos	Elis	
185 §	40 BC	Stadion	Ariston	Thourioi	Eusebius
186 §	36 BC	Stadion	Skamandros	Alexandria Troas	Eusebius
186 §	32 BC	Boxing	Thaliarchos	Elis	
186 §	36 BC	Horse Race	Lykomedes	Elis	
187 §	32 BC	Stadion	Ariston	Thourioi	Eusebius
188 §	28 BC	Stadion	Sopatros	Argos	Eusebius
189 §	24 BC	Trumpet Contest	Demosthenes	Miletos	
189 §	24 BC	Pankration	Philippos Glykon	Pergamon	
189 §	24 BC	Stadion	Asklepiades	Sidon	Eusebius
190 §	20 BC	Diaulos	Unknown name	Miletos	
190 §	20 BC	Hoplitodromos	Unknown name	Miletos	
190 §	20 BC	Trumpet Contest	Demosthenes	Miletos	
190 §	20 BC	Stadion	Auphidios	Patrai	Eusebius
191 §	16 BC	Trumpet Contest	Demosthenes	Miletos	
191 §	16 BC	Stadion	Diodotos	Tyana	Eusebius
192 §	12 BC	Boys' Wrestling	Polyktor	Elis	
192 §	12 BC	Trumpet Contest	Demosthenes	Miletos	
192 §	12 BC	Wrestling	Sosander	Smyrna	
192 §	12 BC	Stadion	Diophanes	Thessaly	Eusebius
193 §	8 BC	Boxing	Nikophon	Miletos	
193 §	8 BC	Stadion	Artemidoros	Thyateira	Eusebius
194 §	4 BC	Stadion	Demaratos	Ephesos	Eusebius
194 §	4 BC	Tethrippon	Tiberius Claudius Nero	Rome	
194 §	4 BC	Boys' Wrestling	Polyxenos	Zakynthos	
195 §	AD 1	Comedy Contest	Quintus Marcius Straton	Athens	
195 §	AD 1	Equestrian Event for Foals	Archiadas	Elis	
195 §	AD 1	Foals' Synoris	Damithidas	Elis	
195 §	AD 1	Stadion	Demaratos	Ephesos	Eusebius
195 §	AD 1	Synoris	Teleutias	Kamiros	
196 §	AD 5	Stadion	Pammenes	Magnesia on the Maeander	Eusebius
196 §	AD 5	Unknown event	Gnaeus Marcus	Rome	
197 §	AD 9	Stadion	Asiatikos	Halikarnassos	Eusebius
197 §	AD 9	Unknown event	Gnaeus Marcus	Rome	
198 §	AD 13	Unknown event	Unknown name	Argos	
198 §	AD 13	Stadion	Diophenes	Prousa	Eusebius
198 §	AD 13	Pankration	Aristeas	Stratonicea	Eusebius
198 §	AD 13	Wrestling	Aristeas	Stratonicea	Eusebius
199 §	AD 17	Stadion	Aischines	Miletos	Eusebius
199 §	AD 17	Tethrippon	Germanicus Julius Caesar	Rome	Eusebius
200 §	AD 21	Fouls' Tethrippon	Kasia Mnasithea	Elis	
200 §	AD 21	Stadion	Polemon	Petra	Eusebius
201 §	AD 25	Pankration	Hermas	Antiochia	
201 §	AD 25	Stadion	Damas (or Damasias)	Kydonia	Eusebius
201 §	AD 25	Boxing	Demokrates	Magnesia on the Maeander	
202 §	AD 29	Pankration	Hermas	Antiochia	
202 §	AD 29	Boxing	Demokrates	Magnesia on the Maeander	
202 §	AD 29	Stadion	Hermogenes	Pergamon	Eusebius
203 §	AD 33	Stadion	Apollonios	Epidauros	Eusebius
203 §	AD 33	Pankration	Heras	Laodicea	
203 §	AD 33	Boxing	Demokrates	Magnesia on the Maeander	
204 §	AD 37	Pankration	Nikostratos	Aegeae	Eusebius
204 §	AD 37	Wrestling	Nikostratos	Aegeae	Eusebius
204 §	AD 37	Stadion	Sarapion	Alexandria	Eusebius
204 §	AD 37	Unknown event	Apollonios	Epidauros	
204 §	AD 37	Unknown event	Hermogenes	Philadelphia	
205 §	AD 41	Unknown event	Apollonios	Epidauros	
205 §	AD 41	Stadion	Eubolidas	Laodicea	Eusebius
206 §	AD 45	Unknown event	Apollonios	Epidauros	
206 §	AD 45	Stadion	Valerius	Mytilene	Eusebius
207 §	AD 49	Stadion	Athenodoros	Aigion	Eusebius
207 §	AD 49	Wrestling	Tiberius Claudius Patrobius	Antiochia	
207 §	AD 49	Boys' Pankration	Publius Cornelius Ariston	Ephesos	
207 §	AD 49	Boxing	Melankomas	Karia	
208 §	AD 53	Stadion	Athenodoros	Aigion	Eusebius
208 §	AD 53	Wrestling	Tiberius Claudius Patrobius	Antiochia	
208 §	AD 53	Equestrian Event for Foals	Kallippos Peisanos	Elis	
208 §	AD 53	Horse Race	Tiberius Claudius Aphrodisius	Elis	
208 §	AD 53	Pankration	Unknown name	Stratonicea	
209 §	AD 57	Wrestling	Tiberius Claudius Patrobius	Antiochia	
209 §	AD 57	Unknown event	Publius Pompeius Eutyches	Philadelphia	
209 §	AD 57	Stadion	Kallikles	Sidon	Eusebius
210 §	AD 61	Stadion	Athenodoros	Aigion	Eusebius
210 §	AD 61	Unknown event	Publius Pompeius Eutyches	Philadelphia	
211 §	AD 65	Pankration	Xenodamos	Antikyra	
211 §	AD 65	Stadion	Tryphon	Philadelphia	Eusebius
211 §	AD 65	Chariot racing	Nero	Rome	Eusebius
211 §	AD 65	Chariot racing for Foals	Nero	Rome	Eusebius
211 §	AD 65	Heralds Contest	Nero	Rome	Eusebius
211 §	AD 65	Lyre-playing	Nero	Rome	Eusebius
211 §	AD 65	Race for Ten-Horse Chariot	Nero	Rome	Eusebius
211 §	AD 65	Tragedy Competition	Nero	Rome	Eusebius
211 §	AD 65	Unknown event	Emperor Nero	Rome	
212 §	AD 69	Trumpet Contest	Diogenes	Ephesos	
212 §	AD 69	Diaulos	Polites	Keramos	
212 §	AD 69	Dolichos	Polites	Keramos	
212 §	AD 69	Stadion	Polites	Keramos	Eusebius
212 §	AD 69	Pankration	Tiberius Claudius Artemidorus	Tralles	Pausanias
213 §	AD 73	Trumpet Contest	Diogenes	Ephesos	
213 §	AD 73	Stadion	Rhodon	Kyme	Eusebius
214 §	AD 77	Stadion	Straton	Alexandria	Eusebius
214 §	AD 77	Trumpet Contest	Diogenes	Ephesos	
215 §	AD 81	Trumpet Contest	Diogenes	Ephesos	
215 §	AD 81	Pankration	Tiberius Claudius Rufus	Smyrna	
215 §	AD 81	Unknown event	Pratomelidas	Sparta	
215 §	AD 81	Diaulos	Titus Flavius Hermogenes	Xanthos	
215 §	AD 81	Hoplitodromos	Titus Flavius Hermogenes	Xanthos	
215 §	AD 81	Stadion	Hermogenes	Xanthos	Eusebius
216 §	AD 85	Pankration	Titus Flavius Artemidoros	Adana	
216 §	AD 85	Trumpet Contest	Diogenes	Ephesos	
216 §	AD 85	Dolichos	Titus Flavius Metrobius	Iasos	
216 §	AD 85	Unknown event	(Prato)melidas	Sparta	
216 §	AD 85	Stadion	Apollophanes	Tarsos	Eusebius
216 §	AD 85	Diaulos	Titus Flavius Hermogenes	Xanthos	
216 §	AD 85	Hoplitodromos	Titus Flavius Hermogenes	Xanthos	
217 §	AD 89	Pankration	Titus Flavius Artemidoros	Adana	
217 §	AD 89	Boys' Boxing	Sarapion	Alexandria	
217 §	AD 89	Boys' Pankration	Nikanor	Ephesos	
217 §	AD 89	Heralds Contest	Marcus Flavius Antoninus	Hierapolis	
217 §	AD 89	Poetry Contest	Serapo(doros)	Melos	
217 §	AD 89	Unknown event	Pankles	Tenos	
217 §	AD 89	Diaulos	Titus Flavius Hermogenes	Xanthos	
217 §	AD 89	Hoplitodromos	Titus Flavius Hermogenes	Xanthos	
217 §	AD 89	Stadion	Titus Flavius Hermogenes	Xanthos	Eusebius
218 §	AD 93	Boxing	Herakleides	Alexandria	
218 §	AD 93	Stadion	Apollonis (or Heliodoros)	Alexandria	Eusebius
218 §	AD 93	Unknown event	Athenaios	Athens	
219 §	AD 97	Boys' Wrestling	Marcus	Antiochia	
219 §	AD 97	Stadion	Stephanos	Kappadokia	Eusebius
220 §	AD 101	Pankration	Titus Flavius Archibios	Alexandria	
220 §	AD 101	Stadion	Achilles	Alexandria	Eusebius
221 §	AD 105	Pankration	Titus Flavius Archibios	Alexandria	
221 §	AD 105	Stadion	Theonas	Alexandria	Eusebius
222 §	AD 109	Stadion	Kallistos	Sidon	Eusebius
222 §	AD 109	Horse race	Unknown name	Unknown location	Eusebius
223 §	AD 113	Dolichos	Unknown name	Rhodes	
223 §	AD 113	Stadion	Eustolos	Sidon	Eusebius
224 §	AD 117	Stadion	Isarion	Alexandria	Eusebius
224 §	AD 117	Boys' Pankration	Publius Aelius Aristomachus	Magnesia on the Maeander	
224 §	AD 117	Dolichos	Unknown name	Rhodes	
225 §	AD 121	Stadion	Aristeas	Miletos	Eusebius
226 §	AD 125	Stadion	Dionysios Sameumys	Alexandria	Eusebius
226 §	AD 125	Boxing	Deidas	Arsinoe	
226 §	AD 125	Hoplitodromos	Aristides	Elis	
226 §	AD 125	Pankration	Marcus Ulpius Domesitcus	Ephesos	
226 §	AD 125	Unknown event	Moschos	Pergamon	
227 §	AD 129	Unknown event	Diephilos	Aigaiai	
227 §	AD 129	Stadion	Dionysios Sameumys	Alexandria	Eusebius
227 §	AD 129	Chariot racing	Lucius Minicius Natalis Quadronius Verus	Barcina	
227 §	AD 129	Pankration	Marcus Ulpius Domesitcus	Ephesos	
227 §	AD 129	Tethrippon	Lucius Minucius Natalis	Rome	
228 §	AD 133	Stadion	Loukas	Alexandria	Eusebius
228 §	AD 133	Boys' Stadion	Aelius Granianus	Sikyon	
229 §	AD 137	Stadion	Epidaurus	Alexandria	Eusebius
229 §	AD 137	Heralds Contest	Publius Aelius Artemas	Laodicea	
229 §	AD 137	Wrestling	Hermagoras	Magnesia ad Sipylum	
229 §	AD 137	Diaulos	Aelius Granianus	Sikyon	
229 §	AD 137	Pentathlon	Aelius Granianus	Sikyon	
230 §	AD 141	Stadion	Didymos Klideus	Alexandria	Eusebius
230 §	AD 141	Boxing	Marcus Tullius	Apamea Myrleia	
230 §	AD 141	Pentathlon	Aelius Granianus	Sikyon	
231 §	AD 145	Boxing	Marcus Tullius	Apamea Myrleia	
231 §	AD 145	Wrestling	Dionysios	Seleucia on the Tigris	
231 §	AD 145	Stadion	Kranaos (or Granianos)	Sikyon	Eusebius
232 §	AD 149	Stadion	Attikos	Sardis	Eusebius
232 §	AD 149	Pankration	Dionysios	Seleucia on the Tigris	
232 §	AD 149	Wrestling	Dionysios	Seleucia on the Tigris	
233 §	AD 153	Pankration	Marcus Aurelius Demetrios	Alexandria	
233 §	AD 153	Diaulos	Demetrios	Chios	
233 §	AD 153	Stadion	Demetrios	Chios	Eusebius
233 §	AD 153	Foals' Tethrippon	Kasia Mnasithea	Elis	
234 §	AD 157	Stadion	Heras	Chios	Eusebius
235 §	AD 161	Hoplitodromos	Mnasiboulos	Elateia	
235 §	AD 161	Stadion	Mnasiboulos	Elateia	Eusebius
235 §	AD 161	Lyre Contest	Titus Antonius Eutykhianos	Pessinous	
236 §	AD 165	Stadion	Aeithales	Alexandria	Eusebius
236 §	AD 165	Wrestling	Marcus Aerlius Chrysippos	Smyrna	
236 §	AD 165	Heralds Contest	Titus Aelius Aurelius Apollonius	Tarsos	
237 §	AD 169	Stadion	Eudaimon	Alexandria	Eusebius
237 §	AD 169	Foot Race	Unknown name	Philadelphia	
237 §	AD 169	Unknown event	Unknown name	Philadelphia	
238 §	AD 173	Stadion	Agathopous	Aegina	Eusebius
238 §	AD 173	Boxing	Photion	Ephesos	
238 §	AD 173	Horse Race	(Tiberius Claudius?) Theopropos	Rhodes	
238 §	AD 173	Wrestling	Unknown name	Rhodes	
238 §	AD 173	Pankration	Marcus Aurelius Demostratos Damas	Sardis	
239 §	AD 177	Stadion	Agathopous	Aegina	Eusebius
239 §	AD 177	Wrestling	Marcus Aurelius Hermagoras	Magnesia ad Sipylum	
239 §	AD 177	Heralds Contest	Gaius Julius Bassus	Miletos	
239 §	AD 177	Pankration	Marcus Aurelius Demostratos Damas	Sardis	
240 §	AD 181	Pankration	Marcus Aurelius Asklepiades	Alexandria	
240 §	AD 181	Stadion	Anoubin	Alexandria	Eusebius
240 §	AD 181	Hoplitodromos	K[...]ktabenos	Ephesos	
241 §	AD 185	Stadion	Heron	Alexandria	Eusebius
241 §	AD 185	Hoplitodromos	K[...]ktabenos	Ephesos	
241 §	AD 185	Unknown event	Titus Aelius Aurelius Metrodorus	Philadelphia	
242 §	AD 189	Stadion	Magnos	Cyrene	Eusebius
242 §	AD 189	Unknown event	Marcus Aurelius Philosebastus	Ephesos	
242 §	AD 189	Unknown event	Claudius Apollonius	Smyrna	
242 §	AD 189	Unknown event	Titus Julius Septimius Julianus	Smyrna	
243 §	AD 193	Pankration	Marcus Aurelius Asklepiades	Alexandria	
243 §	AD 193	Stadion	Isidoros	Alexandria	Eusebius
243 §	AD 193	Wrestling	Marcus Aurelius Asklepiades	Alexandria	
243 §	AD 193	Horse Race	Theopropos	Rhodes	
244 §	AD 197	Stadion	Isidoros	Alexandria	Eusebius
244 §	AD 197	Wrestling	Marcus Aurelius Asklepiades	Alexandria	
244 §	AD 197	Boxing	Unknown name	Ephesos	
244 §	AD 197	Pentathlon	Aurelius Metrodorus	Kyzikos	
244 §	AD 197	Horse Race	Theopropos	Rhodes	
245 §	AD 201	Stadion	Alexandros	Alexandria	Eusebius
245 §	AD 201	Boxing	Unknown name	Ephesos	
245 §	AD 201	Unknown event	Marcus Aurelius Hierokles	Nysa	
246 §	AD 205	Stadion	Epinikos	Kyzikos	Eusebius
246 §	AD 205	Unknown event	Marcus Aurelius Kleanor	Sparta	
247 §	AD 209	Stadion	Satornilos	Gortys	Eusebius
247 §	AD 209	Wrestling	Gerenos	Naukratis	
247 §	AD 209	Pankration	Gaius Perelius Aurelius Alexandrus	Thyateira	
248 §	AD 213	Stadion	Heliodoros	Alexandria	Eusebius
248 §	AD 213	Dolichos	Unknown name	Bithynia	
248 §	AD 213	Pankration	Lucius Silicius Firmus Mandrogenes	Magnesia on the Maeander	
248 §	AD 213	Wrestling	Aurelius Aelix	Phoenicia	
249 §	AD 217	Stadion	Heliodoros	Alexandria	Eusebius
249 §	AD 217	Dolichos	Unknown name	Bithynia	
249 §	AD 217	Trumpet Contest	Publius Aelius Aurelius Serapion	Ephesos	
249 §	AD 217	Pankration	Aurelius Aelix	Phoenicia	
249 §	AD 217	Wrestling	Aurelius Aelix	Phoenicia	
250 §	AD 221	Dolichos	Unknown name	Bithynia	
250 §	AD 221	Pankration	Aurelius Phoibammon	Egypt	
250 §	AD 221	Stadion	Publius Aelius Alkandridas	Sparta	Eusebius
251 §	AD 225	Pankration	Aurelius Phoibammon	Hermopolis	
251 §	AD 225	Unknown event	Publius Aelius Granianus Fannius Artemidorus	Miletos	
251 §	AD 225	Stadion	Publius Aelius Alkandridas	Sparta	Eusebius
252 §	AD 229	Pentathlon	Demetrios	Salamis	
252 §	AD 229	Stadion	Demetrios	Salamis	Eusebius
252 §	AD 229	Unknown event	Claudius Rufus	Salamis	
253 §	AD 233	Pentathlon	Demetrios	Salamis	
253 §	AD 233	Stadion	Demetrios	Salamis	Eusebius
253 §	AD 233	Unknown event	Claudius Rufus	Salamis	
254 §	AD 237	Stadion	Demetrios	Salamis	Eusebius
255 §	AD 241	Unknown event	Aurelius Germanus	Arsinoe	
255 §	AD 241	Tethrippon	Titus Domitius Prometheus	Athens	
255 §	AD 241	Pentathlon	Publius Asklepiades	Corinth	IvO 240/241
256 §	AD 245	Unknown event	Tiberius Claudius Diodorus	Hermopolis	
256 §	AD 245	Heralds Contest	Valerius Eklektus	Sinope	
257 §	AD 249	Unknown event	Unknown name	Athens	
257 §	AD 249	Unknown event	Marcus Aurelius Pius	Daldis	
258 §	AD 253	Heralds Contest	Valerius Eklektus	Sinope	
259 §	AD 257	Heralds Contest	Valerius Eklektus	Sinope	
260 §	AD 261	Heralds Contest	Valerius Eklektus	Sinope	
261 §	AD 265	Unknown event	No recorded victors	Unknown location	
262 §	AD 269	Stadion	Dionysius	Alexandria	
263 §	AD 273	Stadion	Dionysius	Alexandria	Dexippos the Athenian, apud Panodoros
264 §	AD 277	Unknown event	Marcus Aurelius Pius	Daldis	
264 §	AD 277	Unknown event	Aurelius Sarapammon	Oxyrhynchos	
275 §	AD 321 AD	Boys' Pankration	Markianos	Sardis	
278 §	AD 333	Pentathlon	Trias	Athens	
278 §	AD 333	Diaulos	Stratonikos	Tenedos	
278 §	AD 333	Boys' Pankration	Heliodoros	Thespiai	
278 §	AD 333	Dolichos	Kallon	Thespiai	
280 §	AD 341	Boys' Pankration	Aurelius	Athens	
286 §	AD 365	Pentathlon	Pankratios	Athens	
287 §	AD 369	Boxing	Varazdat	Armenia	Moses of Chorene's History of Armenia (3.40)
287 §	AD 369	Unknown event	Philoumenos	Philadelphia	
290 §	AD 381	Pankration	Eukarpidês Zopyros	Athens	
291 §	AD 385	Boys' Boxing	Aurelios Zopyros	Athens	
—	Unknown	Pankration	Leukaros	Acarnania	
—	Unknown	Dolichos	Marcus Aurelius Abas	Adada	
—	Unknown	Pentathlon	Ainetos	Akrion in Laconia	
—	Unknown	Stadion	Lucius Septimius Aurelius Serapion	Alexandria	
—	Unknown	Boys' Wrestling	Prokles	Andros	
—	Unknown	Unknown event	Gaius Ilius Aurelius Protogenes	Anemurium	
—	Unknown	Dolichos	Amphilokhos, son of Theison	Antiochia on the Pyramus	
—	Unknown	Boxing	Kandidianos	Aphrodisias	
—	Unknown	Unknown event	Piseas, son of Piseas	Aphrodisias	
—	Unknown	Unknown event	Mnasiadas	Argos	
—	Unknown	Wrestling	Platon	Athens	
—	Unknown	Heralds Contest	Marcus Ulpius Heliodoros	Attaleia	
—	Unknown	Stadion	Aurelius Fronto	Augusta Traiana	
—	Unknown	Boys' Boxing	Aggeles	Chios	
—	Unknown	Tethrippon	Periandros	Corinth	
—	Unknown	Boxing	Eurydamas	Cyrene	
—	Unknown	Boxing	Brimias	Elis	
—	Unknown	Boys' Boxing	Eualkidas	Elis	
—	Unknown	Boys' Wrestling	Anauchidas	Elis	
—	Unknown	Boys' Wrestling	Pherenikos	Elis	
—	Unknown	Boys' Wrestling	Philles	Elis	
—	Unknown	Diaulos	Gorgos	Elis	
—	Unknown	Diaulos	Kharinos	Elis	
—	Unknown	Hoplitodromos	Gorgos	Elis	
—	Unknown	Hoplitodromos	Kharinos	Elis	
—	Unknown	Hoplitodromos	Neolaidas	Elis	
—	Unknown	Pentathlon	Aiskhines	Elis	
—	Unknown	Pentathlon	Eupolemos	Elis	
—	Unknown	Pentathlon	Gorgos	Elis	
—	Unknown	Pentathlon	Klearkhos	Elis	
—	Unknown	Pentathlon	Menalkes	Elis	
—	Unknown	Pentathlon	Theodoros	Elis	
—	Unknown	Unknown event	(…)nos	Elis	
—	Unknown	Unknown event	Thrasym(…)	Elis	
—	Unknown	Rhetoric Competition	Aurelius Ankharenos Phaidros	Ephesos	
—	Unknown	Unknown event	Marcus Antonius Lollianus	Ephesos	
—	Unknown	Heralds Contest	Marcus Aurelius Silvanus	Hermopolis	
—	Unknown	Tethrippon	Skopas	Krannon	
—	Unknown	Heralds Contest	Publius Aelius (…)	Kyzikos	
—	Unknown	Pentathlon	Lykos	Messene	
—	Unknown	Boys' Boxing	Boutas	Miletos	
—	Unknown	Unknown event	Miletus	Miletos	
—	Unknown	Wrestling	(…)	Miletos	
—	Unknown	Boys' Wrestling	Dionysid(oros)	Mylasa	
—	Unknown	Boxing	Marcus Aurelius Pappos	Myra	
—	Unknown	Pankration	Aurelius Toalius	Oinoanda	
—	Unknown	Boys' Wrestling	(…)	Rhodes	
—	Unknown	Wrestling	Nikosylos	Rhodes	
—	Unknown	Unknown event	Tiberius Claudius Nikanor	Seleucia Pieria	
—	Unknown	Boys' Boxing	Khaireas	Sikyon	
—	Unknown	Comedy Contest	Menekrates	Sikyon	
—	Unknown	Boxing	Marcus Justinius Marcianus Rufus	Sinope	
—	Unknown	Unknown event	Tiberius Julius Septimius Julianus	Smyrna	
—	Unknown	Unknown event	(…)r	Sparta	
—	Unknown	Unknown event	Marcus Ulpius Sokrates	Sparta	
—	Unknown	Unknown event	(…) Ulpius	Telmessos	
—	AD 337	Boys' Pankration	Heliodoros	Thespiai	
—	Unknown	Unknown event	Marcianus	Thyateira	
—	Unknown	Unknown event	Marcus Aurelius Epaphrodeitos	Tlos	
—	Unknown	Unknown event	Epigonos	Tralles	
—	Unknown	Rhetoric Competition	Aurelius Athenaios	Tyana	
—	Unknown	Aulos Competition	Bentidios Sota	Unknown location	
—	Unknown	Boxing	Olympikus	Unknown location	
—	Unknown	Unknown event	(A)ristarkh(os)	Unknown location	

== See also ==
- Ancient Olympic Games
- Olympic winners of the Archaic period
- Ancient Greek Olympic festivals
- Hellanodikai

== Sources ==
- Arete: Greek Sports from Ancient Sources, Stephen G. Miller, University of California Press, 2 Aug 2012
- Sports in the Ancient World, from A to Z, Mark Golden, Routledge, 1 Jun 2004
- Renson, R., Laummer, M., Riordan J. et al. (eds.), The Olympic Games Through the Ages: Greek Antiquity and its Impact on Modern Sport, Athens 1991.
- Young, D.C., The Origins of Modern Olympics: A New Version, International Journal of the History of Sports, 3 (1987), 271–300
- L. Moretti, Olympionikai, i vincitori negli Antichi agoni Olimpici, MemLinc, Roma, 1957; L. Moretti, "Supplemento al catalogo degli Olympionikai," Klio 52, 1970, pp. 295– 303.
