= Desmon of Corinth =

Desmon of Corinth was an ancient Greek athlete from Corinth, who won the stadion race of the 14th Ancient Olympic Games in 724 BC. These were the first Olympic Games that also saw a double race, i.e. a race with a distance of 2 stadia, called Diaulos (δίαυλος); this double race was won by Hypenus of Elis.
