= Acanthus of Sparta =

8th-century BC Greek athlete

Personal information
- Born: Sparta, Laconia

Sport
- Event(s): Diaulos and Dolichos
Medal record
Ancient Greek Olympics
Representing Laconia
Olympic Games
Gold medal – first place	720 BC Olympia	Diaulos
Gold medal – first place	720 BC Olympia	Dolichos

Acanthus the Lacedaemonian (Ancient Greek: Ἄκανθος), was the victor in two footrace events, the diaulos (δίαυλος) and dolichos (δόλιχος), in the Olympic Games of 720 BC. He was also, according to some accounts, the first who ran naked in these games. Other accounts ascribe this to Orsippus the Megarian. Thucydides says that the Lacedaemonians were the first who contended naked in gymnastic games, although he does not mention Acanthus by name.
