= Timaios of Elis =

Personal information
- Born: 5th century BC Elis

Sport
- Event: 96th Olympic Games
Medal record
Ancient Greek Olympics
Representing Elis
96th Olympic Games
Gold medal – first place	396 BC, Olympia, Elis	Herald and Trumpet contest

Timaios of Elis (Note: Greek: Τίμαιος ο Ηλείος, transcription: Tímaios o Ileíos.) (5th/4th century BC) was a sportsperson originating from Elis in Ancient Greece.

== Sports career ==
In 396 BC, he was crowned the victor of the trumpet contest at the 96th ancient Olympic Games, during which he had represented his homeregion of Elis. He was the first person in history to win in that competition.
