= IvO 240/241 =

Bronze discus awarded in the ancient Olympic Games in the year 241 CE

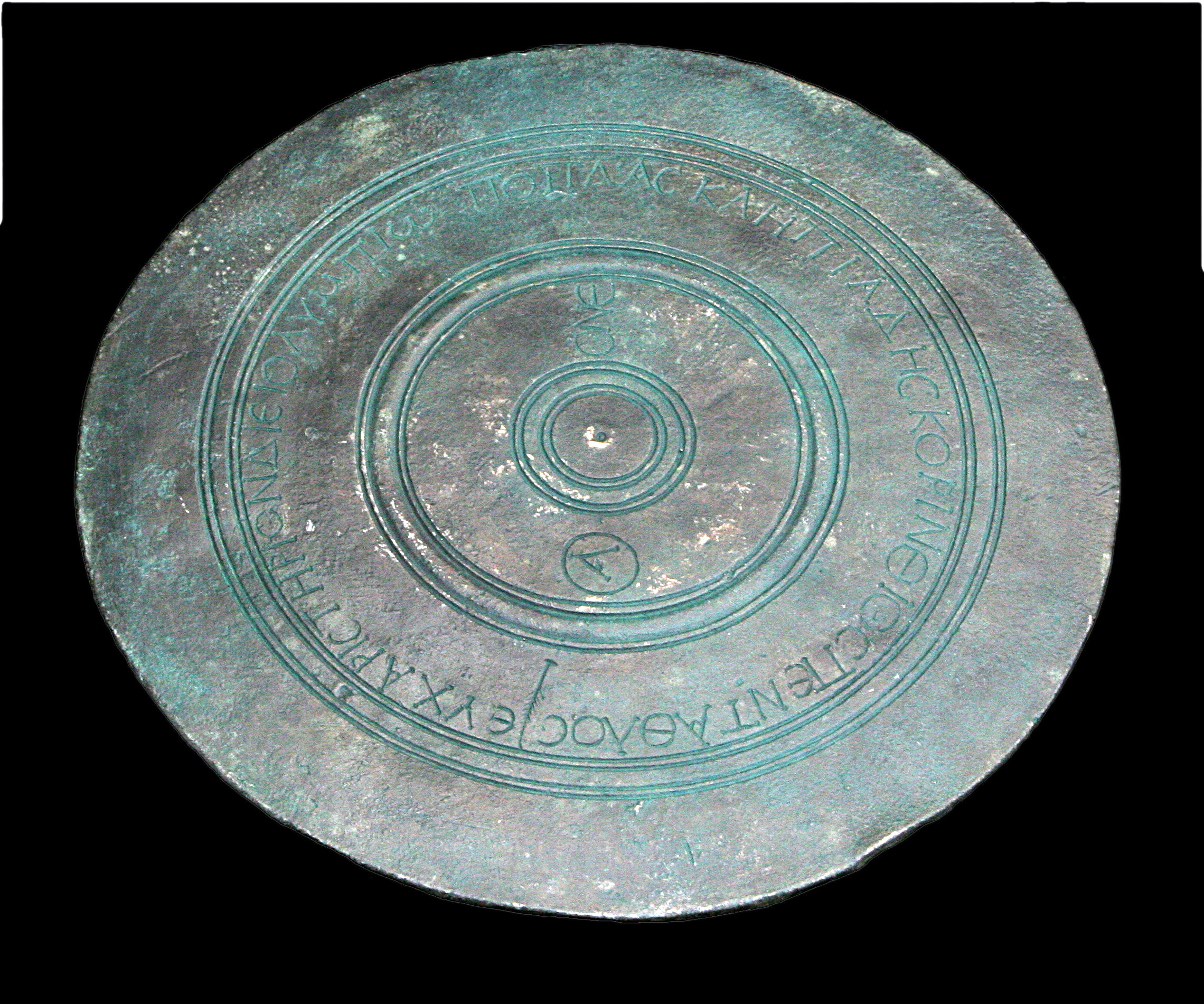
Bronze discus offered as a votive dedication to Zeus

IvO 240/241 is the catalogue number of a bronze discus awarded to Publius Asklepiades after his victory in the ancient Olympic Games in the year 241 CE. The inscription on the discus reads that he won the pentathlon in the 456th Olympiad and that this object be dedicated to the Zeus. The original currently resides in the Archaeological Museum of Olympia in Greece, but a replica is on display in the Glyptothek Museum in Munich, Germany.

== Description ==
This discus follows the trend of most discuses found from this era. It weighs about 9 lbs (4.08 kg), and this specific discus and is about 6 inches in diameter (15.24 cm). It is made of bronze. In general, discuses in the ancient Olympics varied greatly in size and weight, so this discus should not be considered a part of any trend. Common materials for discuses include stone, iron, bronze, and lead, but each material would make the discus weigh very differently. The use of bronze material for this dedication suggests Asklepiades' access to funds because, of these materials, bronze is more expensive.

== Purpose and use ==
Bronze discuses were known for their use in the ancient Greek pentathlon. Occasionally this equipment would be offered as votive dedications to the gods for their success in the Olympic Games. These games took place in Olympia.

For the discus portion of the pentathlon, individuals attempted to throw the discus the furthest. Different distances were marked by wooden pegs in the ground. In terms of form for throwing discuses, there was no set form or technique in antiquity that has been recorded.

Publius Asklepiades, a man originating from the polis of Corinth, won the pentathlon in the year 241 CE, and because of his victory, he dedicated a discus to the god Zeus as thanks. Most likely, as with other votive dedications, this artifact was not used for the sport but rather just as a votive dedication.

Although mainly used for sporting events, oftentimes these objects would be offered as votive dedications to the gods. The symbolic nature of a lot of these votive dedications tell modern historians of the nature of the individuals making these dedications.

== Votive dedications ==
In general, this artifact demonstrates the dedication of objects to supernatural beings for the victories of individuals in the Olympic games. Although mainly used for sporting events, oftentimes these objects would be offered as votive dedications to the gods. The symbolic nature of a lot of these votive dedications tell modern historians of the nature of the individuals making these dedications.
