= Krokinas of Larissa =

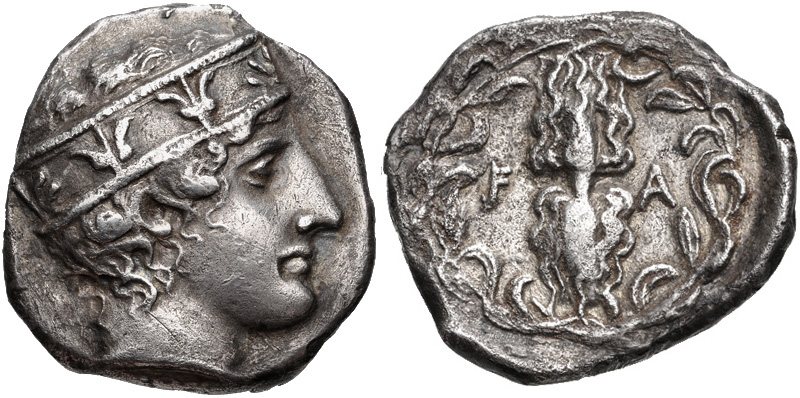
Stater of Olympia used in the 94th Ancient Olympic Games (404 BC)

Krokinas of Larissa or Kroukinas (5th-4th century BC) was an Ancient Greek athlete, who won the stadion (404 BC) and the diaulos (396 BC) of the 94th and later 96th Olympic Games.
