= Tiberius Claudius Patrobius =

Ancient Olympics winner

Personal information
- Born: 1st century AD Antioch, Roman Syria

Sport
- Event: Greek wrestling
Medal record
Ancient Greek Olympics
Representing Antioch in Syria
Olympic Games
Gold medal – first place	49 AD Olympia	Greek wrestling
Gold medal – first place	53 AD Olympia	Greek wrestling
Gold medal – first place	57 AD Olympia	Greek wrestling

Tiberius Claudius Patrobius (1st century AD) was an ancient athlete from Antioch in Provincia Syria, who was a 3-time Olympic champion in the sport of wrestling, according to the 207th (49 AD), 208th (53 AD), and 209th (57 AD) Ancient Olympic Games. He was also victorious in wrestling at Nemea and Isthmia, and was an honorary citizen of the city of Alexandria.

His career length was estimated at 15 years. Some sources mention victories at Antioch Olympic festival and that he may have been periodonikes.
