= Philinus of Cos (athlete) =

Philinus of Cos (Greek: Φιλῖνος ὁ Κῷος; 3rd century BC), son of Hegepolis, was an ancient Greek athlete and five times Olympic winner.

== Career ==
He was a five-times Olympic winner in the stadion and diaulos running races (akin to the 200m and 400m sprints of modern Olympics).

From then he reigned for over a decade in the stadia of Ancient Greece. In the 129th Olympiad in 264 BC he won in both the stadion and the diaulos; he repeated the feat at the 130th Olympiad in 260 BC where he also won in both the stadion and the diaulos. According to Mark Golden, his fifth victory may have been the diaulos in 256 BC. Besides the Olympic games he had a total of 11 wins in the Isthmian games, four wins at the Pythian games, and another four wins at the Nemean games. In total he was victorious 24 times.

The Coans dedicated a statue of him at Olympia, Greece.

== Literary mention ==
He appears in a poem by Theocritus, and is also mentioned by the geographer Pausanias and Eusebius.
