= Papyrus Oxyrhynchus 222 =

Greek list of Olympic victors

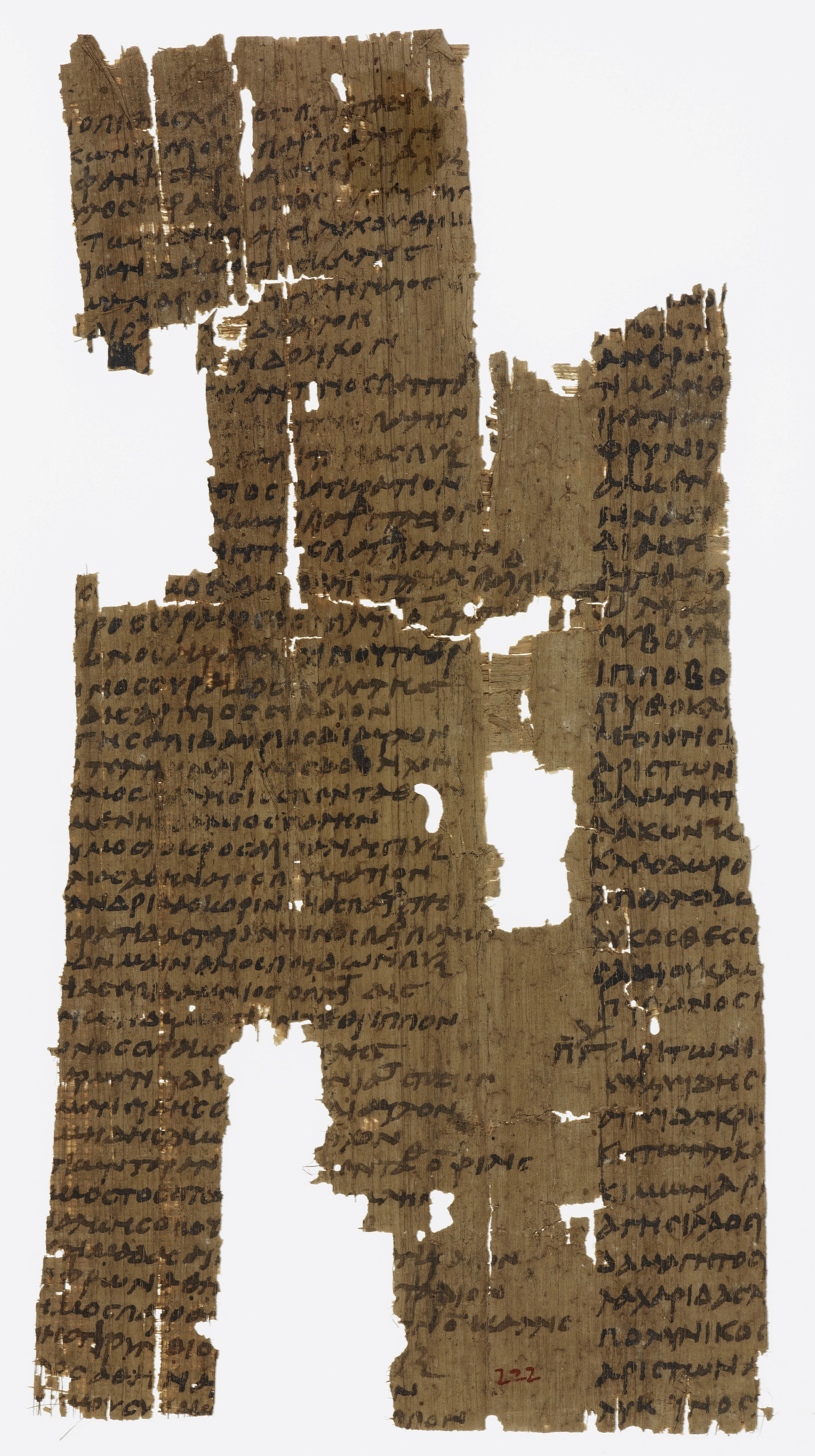
Papyrus Oxyrhynchus 222

Papyrus Oxyrhynchus 222 (P. Oxy. 222 or P. Oxy. II 222) is a list of ancient Olympic victors by an unknown author, written in Greek. It was discovered in Oxyrhynchus. The manuscript was written on papyrus in the form of a roll. It is dated to the third century. Currently it is housed in the British Library (Department of Manuscripts, 1185) in London.

== Description ==
The document was written by an unknown copyist. The recto side contains a list of Olympic victors from 480–468 BC and 456–448 BC. The verso side contains an accounting of money. The measurements of the fragment are 180 by 95 mm. The text is written in a small semi-cursive hand.

It was discovered by Grenfell and Hunt in 1897 in Oxyrhynchus. The text was published by Grenfell and Hunt in 1899.

== Significance ==
According to Grenfell and Hunt, "the number of interesting points upon which the papyrus throws new light is very considerable."

A few examples of these points are as follows: The manuscript allowed for Pindar's victory odes 9, 10 and 11 on the Pythian Games, whose chronology had previously been disputed, to be dated precisely, and for the start date of the Pythian Games to be definitively confirmed at 582 BC. The papyrus also dated Pindar's First Olympian Ode and the Fifth ode of Bacchylides.

This papyrus proved that Bacchylides was alive as late as 452 BC, when the latest previously known date was 468 BC. It showed that Polykleitos and Pythagoras of Rhegium flourished in the fifth century BC. It also cleared up a long-disputed point of interpretation of a passage in Aristotle's Nicomachean Ethics (vii 4.2).

The more general value of the papyrus lies in its bearing on the wider question of the credibility of early scholiasts and commentators on matters of fact of the sort discussed in the manuscript. Because it was found at a remote and relatively unimportant center of Hellenic culture, it shows that such information was widely diffused and easily accessible throughout the Hellenic world. Given such diffusion, false statements of fact by ancient authors would have been easily detected, which makes it very unlikely that such authors would risk exposure by making things up. Thus this manuscript supports an assumption of the trustworthiness of ancient tradition as a sound principle of modern textual criticism.

== See also ==
- Oxyrhynchus Papyri
- Papyrus Oxyrhynchus 221
- Papyrus Oxyrhynchus 223
