= Leonidas of Rhodes =

Ancient Greek Olympic runner

Personal information
- Born: 188 BC Rhodes

Sport
- Events: Stadion, Diaulos, and Hoplitodromos
Medal record
Ancient Greek Olympics
Representing Rhodes
Olympic Games
Gold medal – first place	164 BC Olympia	Stadion
Gold medal – first place	164 BC Olympia	Diaulos
Gold medal – first place	164 BC Olympia	Hoplitodromos
Gold medal – first place	160 BC Olympia	Stadion
Gold medal – first place	160 BC Olympia	Diaulos
Gold medal – first place	160 BC Olympia	Hoplitodromos
Gold medal – first place	156 BC Olympia	Stadion
Gold medal – first place	156 BC Olympia	Diaulos
Gold medal – first place	156 BC Olympia	Hoplitodromos
Gold medal – first place	152 BC Olympia	Stadion
Gold medal – first place	152 BC Olympia	Diaulos
Gold medal – first place	152 BC Olympia	Hoplitodromos

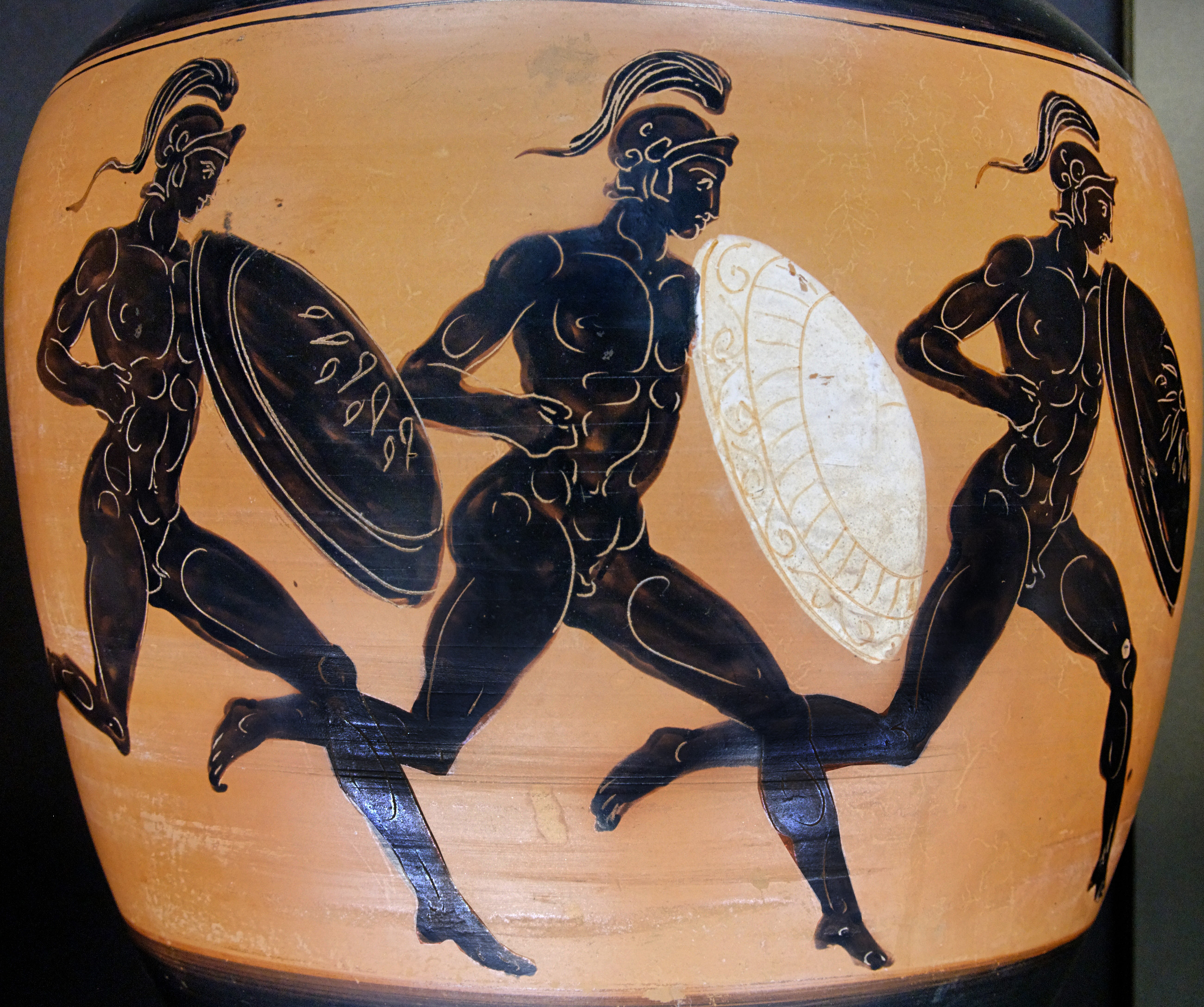
Hoplitodromos. Side B from an Attic black-figure Panathenaic amphora, 323–322 BC. From Benghazi (Cyrenaica, now in Libya).

Leonidas of Rhodes (Ancient Greek: Λεωνίδας ὁ Ῥόδιος; born 188 BC) was one of the most famous ancient Olympic runners. For four consecutive Olympiads (164–152 BC), he was champion of three foot races. He was hailed with the title "Triastes" (tripler). Leonidas is acclaimed by some to be one of the greatest sprinters of all time.

== Olympic career ==
Competing in the Olympic Games of the 154th Olympiad in 164 BC, the last of the "golden age" of the ancient Games, Leonidas captured the crown in three separate foot races: the stadion, the diaulos, and the hoplitodromos. He repeated this feat in the three subsequent Olympics, in 160 BC, in 156 BC, and finally in 152 BC at the age of 36. Leonidas's lifetime record of twelve individual Olympic victory wreaths was unmatched in the ancient world. His record was broken in 2016 by swimmer Michael Phelps.

His number of victories are a testament to his versatility as a runner. Philostratus the Athenian wrote in his Gymnastikos that Leonidas made all previous theories of runners' training and body types obsolete. The stadion and the diaulos, foot races of some 200 and 400 meters respectively, were best suited to sprinters, while the hoplitodromos (a diaulos performed with bronze armor and shield) required more muscular strength and endurance.
