= Kerykes =

Eleusinian hierophant

Kerykes /ˈkɛrɪˌkiːz/ or ceryces /ˈsɛrɪˌsiːz/ (Ancient Greek: Κήρυκες, pl. of Κῆρυξ, Keryx) were ancient Greek functionaries, who served as heralds, announcers, and messengers. They are attested from the Bronze Age onwards.

== Bronze Age ==
Linear B tablets from Bronze Age Pylos ca. 1200 BC refer to 𐀏𐀬𐀐 ka-ru-ke serving the 𐀨𐀷𐀒𐀪 ra-wa-ko-ri, the commander of armed forces. In Athens, this office became ceremonial, functioning from the Leokoreion, a building site at the Dipylon Gate. Linear B tablets that refer to the keryx mention the office in connection with 𐀁𐀔𐁀𐀀𐀩𐀊 e-ma-a_{2} (e-ma-ha) a-re-ja, Hermes Areias, meaning either the Warrior, or the Curser (aras).

== Homeric epics ==
In Iliad, the Homeric epic, heralds serve heroic nobility in humble tasks, as cooks, fire-kindlers, wine-pourers, and waiters during feasts and symposia, as scavengers of corpses on the battlefield for cremation or as umpires during funeral games, as messengers between enemies, allies, and warriors during battle, as announcers of public assembly and as language translators (hermeneus), and in other odd jobs that earned them the rank of demiourgoi, public workers. Their ubiquitous yet invisible presence behind the scenes requires concentration, for to understand what they did demands a shift in focus, like watching the black and white striped referees in a football game, rather than the players competing and scoring. Accordingly, demiourgoi alone demonstrate declining status, hence the heraldic office itself declined in sanctity and authority, even though its exalted status survived in archaic Athens. Two of the most prominent kerykes were the Spartan herald Talthybios, and the Trojan herald Idaios, both being spear-carriers; they were known by the epithet pepnumenō.

== Archaic Period ==
By the archaic period 700-650 BC, Hesiod identifies Hermes with the herald of the Olympian gods that has special control over the daimonic winged Keres in-flight into and out of Demeter Pandora, personified wine-storage jars blamed for all of the ills of humans, where only Hope lingered at the rim. She was Demeter Anesidora, one aspect of the grain-goddess at Athens who preceded the revenge-filled Demeter Erinys 'at Eleusis.The Homeric Hymn to Demeter (147) names her Maia, also the mother of Hermes Kêryx. The burial spot of herald Anthemokritos helps identify the larger grave-mound of the Athenian Kerykes with the massive Tomb 9 along the Eridanos River outside the Dipylon Gate.

== Classical period ==
By the classical period, the Kerykes, sons of Hermes, were one of the sacred Eleusinian families of priests that ran the Eleusinian Mysteries. They popularized the cult and allowed many more to be initiated into the great secrets of Demeter and Persephone, including the concoction kukeion, or kykeon. Starting about 300 BC, the state took over control of the Mysteries, specifically controlled by two clans (gene): the Eumolpidae and the Kerykes.

Kerykes were also part of the ritual and competitors at the Olympic Games (see Herald and Trumpet contest).

== See also ==
- Keryx, herald in mythology
- List of Mycenaean deities
- "The Common Voice of the People" - A book length PhD study on heralds in Ancient Greece.
