= Hypenus of Elis =

Hypenus of Elis was an ancient Greek athlete from Elis who won the double race (Diaulos) of the 14th Ancient Olympic Games in 724 BC. It was the first time that the double race, i.e. a race with a distance of 2 stadia = 2 x 192 m, was run at the Olympic Games.
