= Timasitheus of Delphi =

Late 6th-century Greek soldier and Olympic competitor

- Died: c. 508

Timasitheus (Ancient Greek: Τιμασίθεος) was an athlete of Delphi, who was victorious several times in the pankration at the Olympic and Pythian Games, and was also distinguished as a brave soldier.

== Background ==
He was one of the partisans of the Athenian archon Isagoras when they seized the Acropolis with the help of Cleomenes I. The citadel was besieged by the Athenians, and Timasitheus was one of those who fell into their hands, and was put to death. Pausanias mentions a statue of Timasitheus at Olympia, the work of Ageladas the Argive.
