= Hoplitodromos =

Ancient Greek foot race in armor

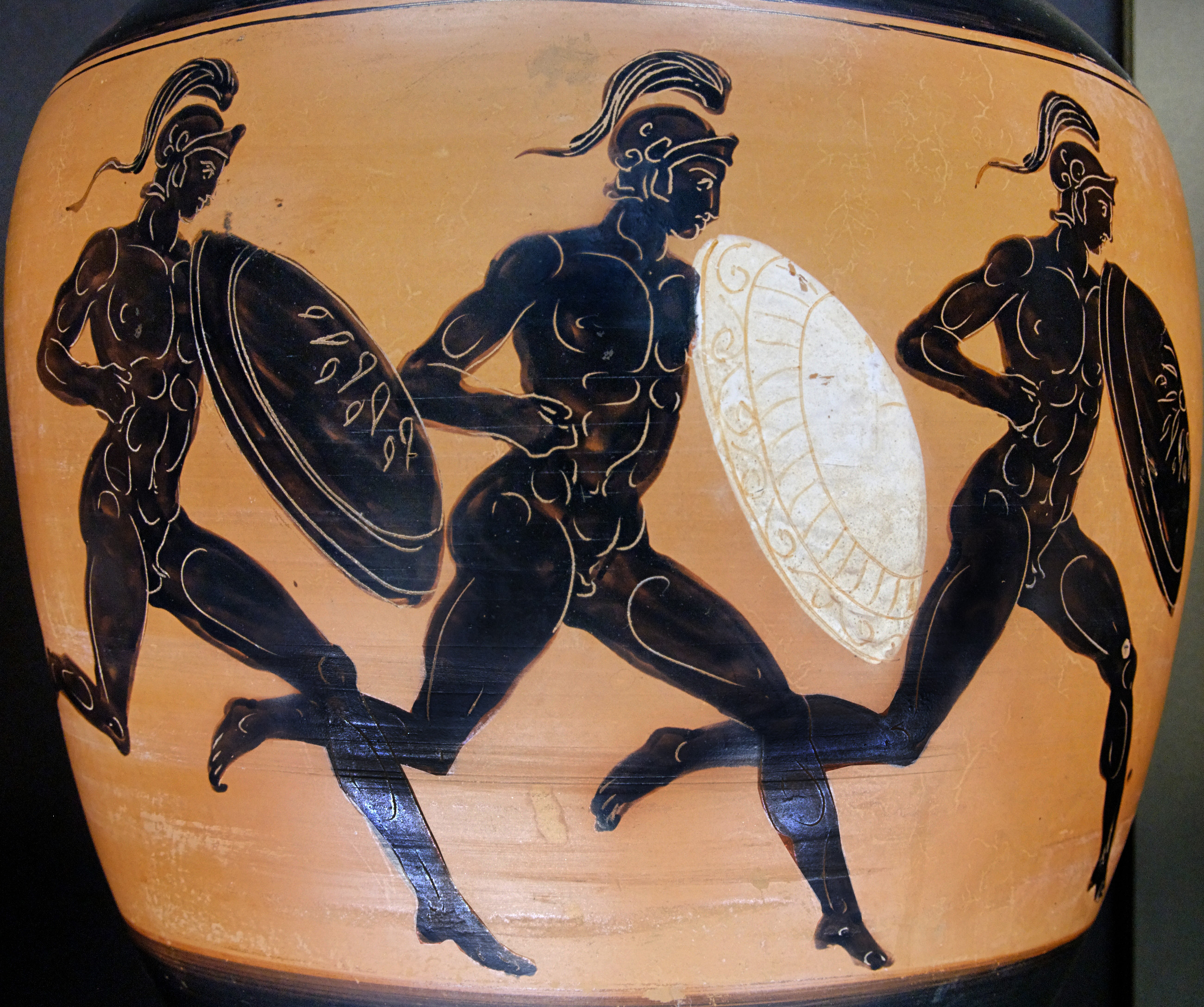
Hoplitodromos from an Attic black-figure Panathenaic amphora, 323–322 BC

The hoplitodromos or hoplitodromia (Greek: ὁπλιτόδρομος, ὁπλιτοδρομία, English translation: "race of the hoplites") was an ancient foot race, part of the Olympic Games and the other Panhellenic Games. It was the last foot race to be added to the Olympics, first appearing at the 65th Olympics in 520 BC, and was traditionally the last foot race to be held.

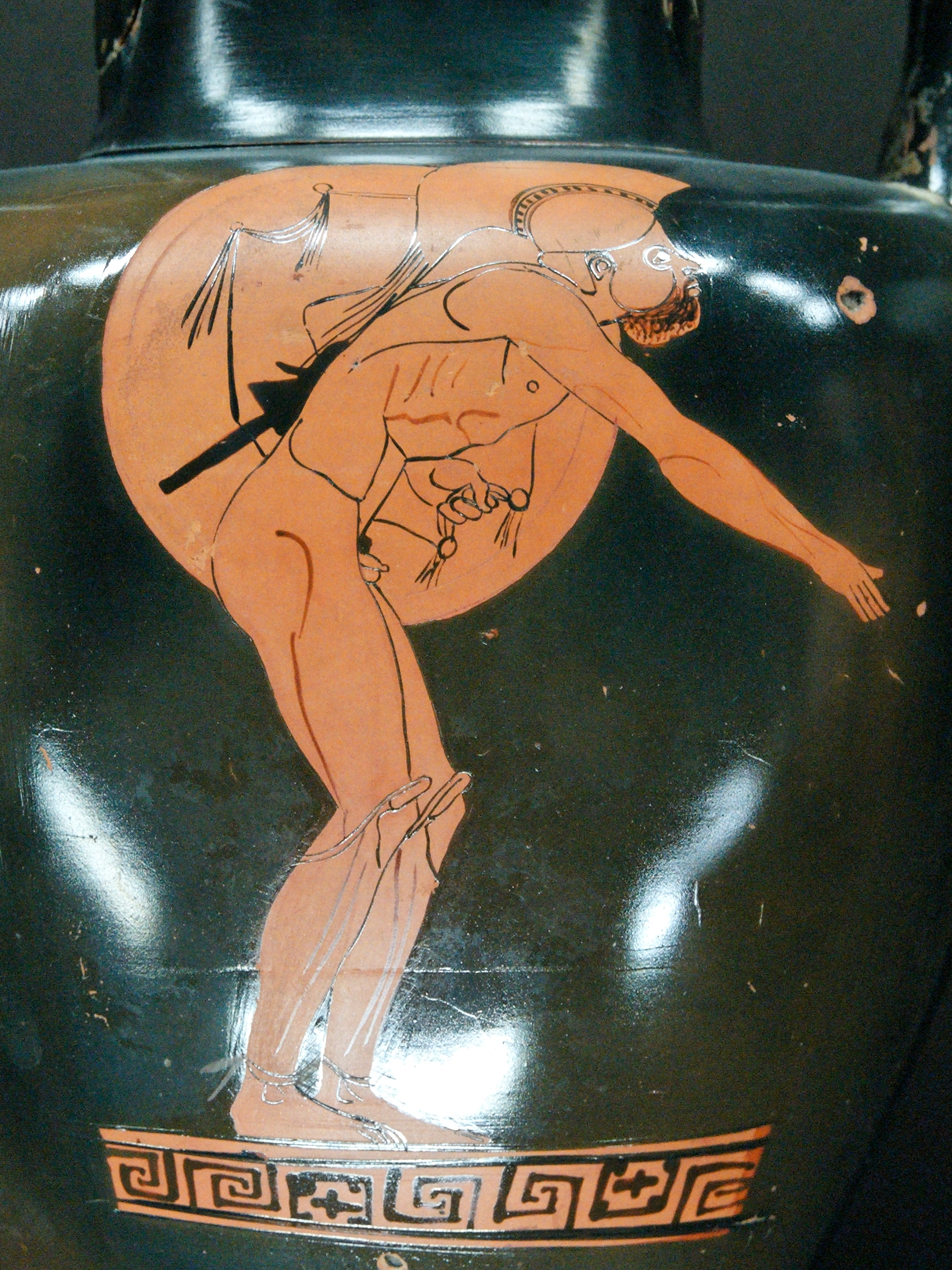
Hoplitodromia, Attic red-figured neck-amphora by the Berlin Painter, c. 480–70 BC, Louvre Museum (CA 214)

Unlike the other races, which were generally run in the nude, the hoplitodromos required competitors to run wearing the hopla, the helmet, greaves and heavy shield (aspis) from which the hoplite infantryman took its name, bringing the total encumbrance to at least 6 kg (12 pounds). As the hoplitodromos was one of the shorter foot races, the heavy armor and shield were less a test of endurance than one of sheer muscular strength. After 450 BC, the use of greaves was abandoned; however, the weight of the shield and helmet remained substantial.

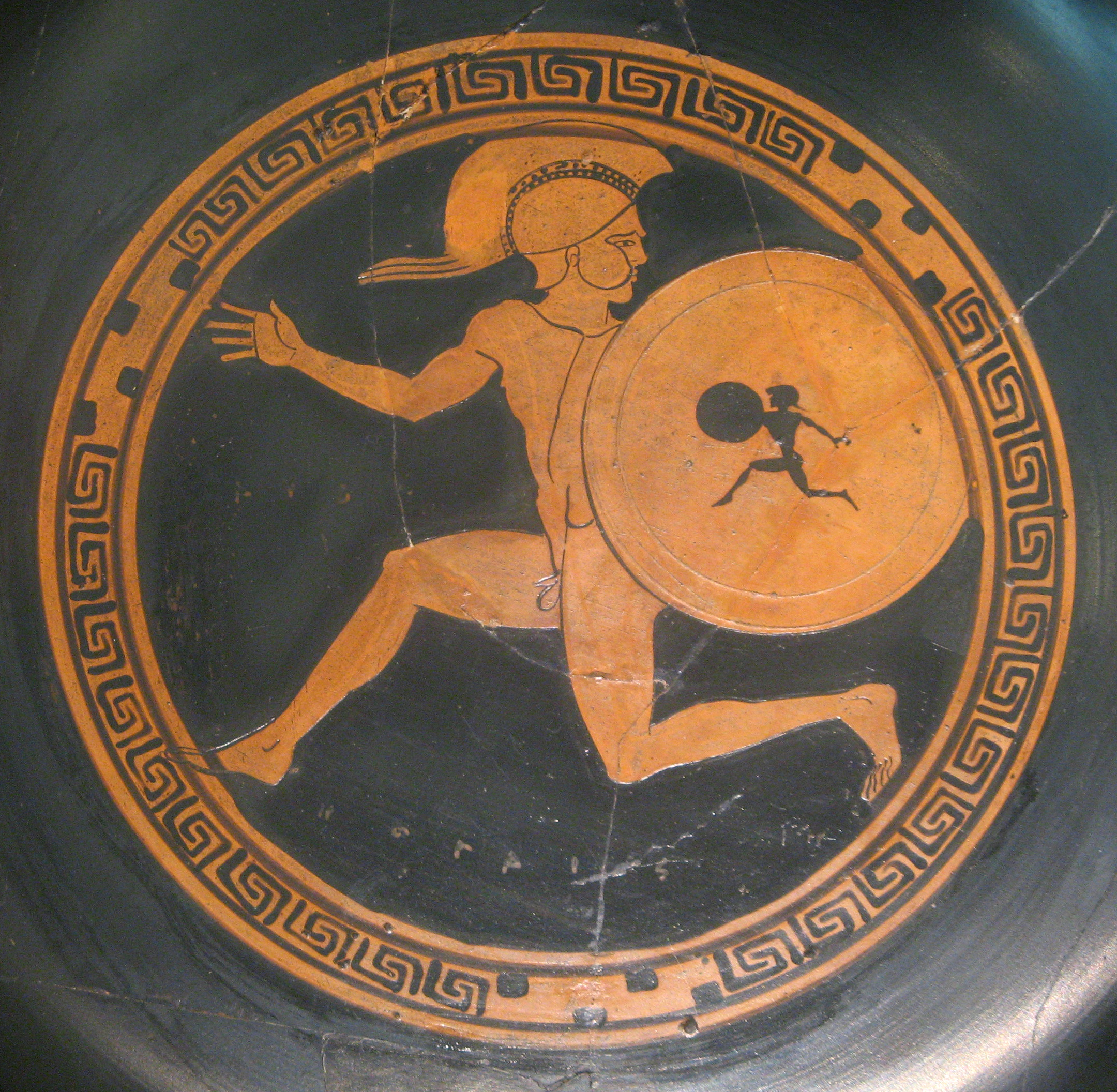
Hoplitodromos (with a second hoplitodromos as a shield device), Attic red-figure cup, c. 500–475 BC

At Olympia and Athens, the hoplitodromos track, like that of the diaulos, was a single lap of the stadium (or two stades; about 350–400 m). Since the track made a hairpin turn at the end of the stadium, there was a turning post called a kampter (καμπτήρ) at each end of the track to assist the sprinters in negotiating the tight turn—a task complicated by the shield carried in the runner's off hand. At Nemea, the distance was doubled to four stades (about 700–800 m), and at Plataea in Boeotia the race was 15 stades in total.

The hoplitodromos, with its military accoutrements, was as much a military training exercise as an athletic contest. Encounters with units of expert Persian archers, first occurring shortly before the hoplitodromos was introduced in 520 BC, must have suggested the need for training the Greek armored infantry in fast "rushing" maneuvers during combat to minimize the time spent exposed to Persian arrows. Additionally, the original 400-meter length of the hoplitodromos coincides well with the effective area of the Persian archers' zone of fire, suggesting an explicit military purpose for this type of training.

== See also ==
- Tübingen Hoplitodromos Runner
