= Kasia Mnasithea =

Personal information
- Native name: Κασία Μνασιθέα
- Occupation: Charioteer
- Years active: 2nd or 3rd-century CE
- Parent: Marcus Betlinus Laitus (father)

Sport
- Sport: Chariot racing

Kasia Mnasithea (Greek: Κασία Μνασιθέα, romanized: Kasía Mnasithéa) was an Elean chariot racer who won an Olympic competition in the year the second or third-century CE. More specifically, she partook in a race involving only young horses, which was described by the inscription commemorating her victory as "ἅρματι πω]-λικῶι" ("hármati pō]-likôi," "young horse chariot"). She was the daughter of an individual named Marcus Betlinus Laitus and a member of a prominent family in her city-state of Elis.
