= Herodorus of Megara =

Herodorus of Megara (Ancient Greek: Ἡρόδωρος ὁ Μεγαρεύς) was an ancient Greek musician, ten times Olympic victor in the trumpet contest. He was noted particularly for his size and the loudness of his trumpet (salpinx) playing.
