= Herald and Trumpet contest =

Ancient Olympic competition

In the 96th Olympiad (396 BC), beside the athletic and artistic competitions, the Herald and Trumpet contest was added, which was already a formal element of the Olympic ritual performed by the kerykes (heralds) and salpinktai (trumpeters). Winners were chosen by the clarity of the enunciation and the audibility of their voice or horn blast. Some notable victors were:

- Timaios of Elis (trumpeter) and Crates (herald) of Elis, the first ones
- Herodorus of Megara (ten times) 328–292 BC trumpeter
- Diogenes of Ephesus 69–85 AD (five times) trumpeter
- Valerius Eclectus of Sinope 245, 253–261 AD (four times) herald

== Sources ==
- Ancient Greek Athletics By Stephen G. Miller Page 85 ISBN 0-300-10083-3 (2006)
