= Orsippus =

Runner in the ancient Greek Olympics

Orsippus (Ancient Greek: Ὄρσιππος) was a Greek runner from Megara who was famed as the first to run the footrace naked at the Olympic Games and "first of all Greeks to be crowned victor naked." Others argue that it was Acanthus instead who first introduced Greek athletic nudity. Orsippus won the stadion of the 15th Olympic Games in 720 BC.

Later, as a general, Orsippus conquered a neighboring territory for Megara, which had recently become independent from Corinth. This accomplishment is commemorated by an epigram inscribed on the base of his statue erected by the Megarians in obedience to a Delphic response.

Orsippus was buried near Coroebus, Elis.
