= Bilistiche =

3rd century BC Hellenistic woman, mistress of Ptolemy II of Egypt and Olympic champion

Bilistiche (Greek: Βιλιστίχη; born c. 280 BC) or Belistiche was a Hellenistic hetaira of Ptolemy II Philadelphus and winner of the 264 BC Olympic Games in tethrippon and synoris.

== Name ==
It is generally accepted that the name Bilistiche is a Macedonian dialectal form of a Greek name. The first element presumably relates to φιλ-, ‘love’; (the phi turns into beta in the Macedonian dialect, cf. Pherenice -> Berenice). The most probable full etymological account of her name accordingly construes it as the superlative stem φιλιστ- followed by the productive suffix -ίχα, found in a number of other female names, particularly in Boeotia (Doricha, Deinicha, Hippicha, etc.).

== Origin ==
According to Pausanias, Bilistiche was a woman from the coast of Macedonia; according to Athenaeus, she was an Argive (said to descend from the line of Atreus); according to Plutarch, a foreign slave bought from the marketplace. If one were to accept Plutarch's information, one might suppose that, as a (former) slave of such origin she was given Macedonian citizenship for her services, although this is considered unlikely.

Olivier Masson dismissed Plutarch's information as fiction concluding that Plutarch had drawn her from the existing entourage of the Macedonian nobility, as does Daniel Ogden, who notes that Plutarch's information probably originated from Sotades' work On Bilistiche whose contents are unknown, but may have been a polemic against her.

== Biography ==
Bilistiche was born around 280 BC. Her father was named Philon (cf. Athenian architect Philon) and was presumably an admiral of Ptolemy II Philadelphus. She won the tethrippon and synoris horse races in the 264 BC Olympic Games, and subsequently she became a mistress of Ptolemy II. They had a son together named Ptolemy Andromachou.

== Death ==
Her date of death is unknown. After her death, it is known that Ptolemy II deified her as Aphrodite Bilistiche. Fragmentary papyri from Ankyronpolis dated to 239/8 BC indicate that later in life she was a money lender. According to Clement of Alexandria, she was buried under the shrine of Sarapis in Alexandria.

== Sources ==
- Golden, Mark (2008). Greek Sport and Social Status. Austin, Texas: University of Texas Press. ISBN 978-0-292-71869-2.
- Pomeroy, Sarah B. (1990). Women in Hellenistic Egypt: From Alexander to Cleopatra. Detroit, Michigan: Wayne State University Press. ISBN 0-8143-2230-1.
