= Ancient Olympic pentathlon =

Ancient Greek athletic contest

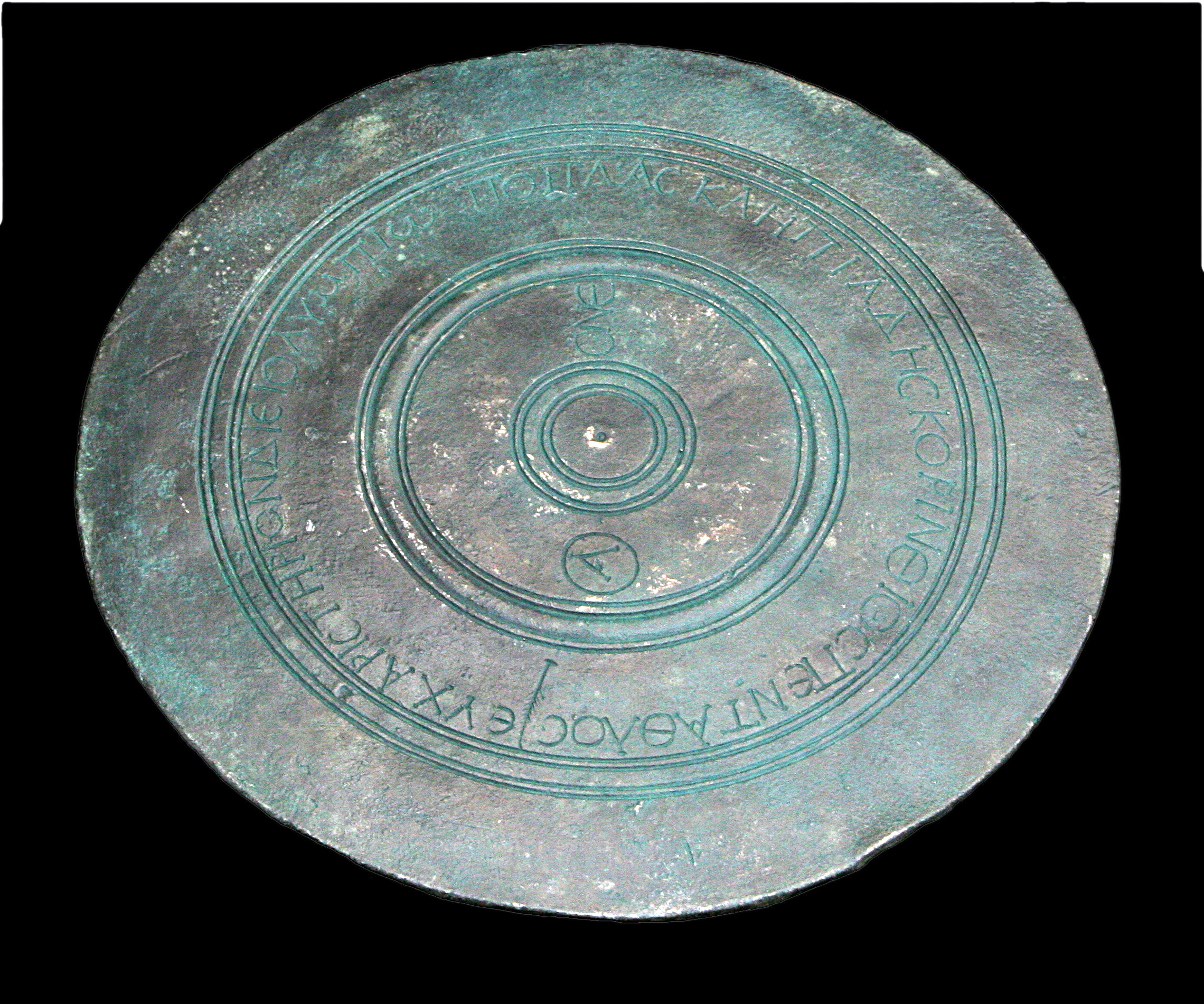
Museum replica of a bronze discus inscribed as a votive offering to Zeus by Asklepiades of Corinth, winner of the pentathlon in the 255th Olympiad (Glyptothek Munich, original in the Archaeological Museum of Olympia)

The Ancient Olympic pentathlon (Greek: πένταθλον) was an athletic contest at the ancient Olympic Games, and other Panhellenic Games of Ancient Greece. The name derives from Greek, combining the words pente (five) and athlon (competition). Five events were contested over one day, starting with the stadion (a short foot race), followed by the javelin throw, discus throw and long jump (the order of these three events is still unclear), and ending with wrestling. While pentathletes were considered to be inferior to the specialized athletes in a given event, they were superior in overall development and were some of the most well balanced of all the athletes. Their training was often part of military service—each of the five events was thought to be useful in battle.

== History ==
The event was first held at the 18th Ancient Olympiad around 708 BC, and changed format a number of times. By the 77th Ancient Olympiad, the pentathlon was generally ordered into three sections: the triagmos of the long jump (Greek: ἅλμα, romanized: hálma), javelin throw (Greek: ἀκόντιον, romanized: akóntion), and discus throw (Greek: δίσκος, romanized: dískos), the stadion (Greek: στάδιον, romanized: stádion) foot race, and wrestling (Greek: πάλη, romanized: pále) as the final event. The first three events were generally not held as individual events, but rather as only part of pentathlon competitions.

The wide variety of skills needed to compete led Aristotle to hold pentathletes in high esteem as physical specimens. In the Rhetoric, he made the following remark: "Beauty varies with each age. In a young man, it consists in possessing a body capable of enduring all efforts, either of the racecourse or of bodily strength, while he himself is pleasant to look upon and a sheer delight. This is why the athletes in the pentathlon are most beautiful, because they are naturally adapted for bodily exertion and for swiftness of foot" (Rhetoric 1361b11).

== Events ==
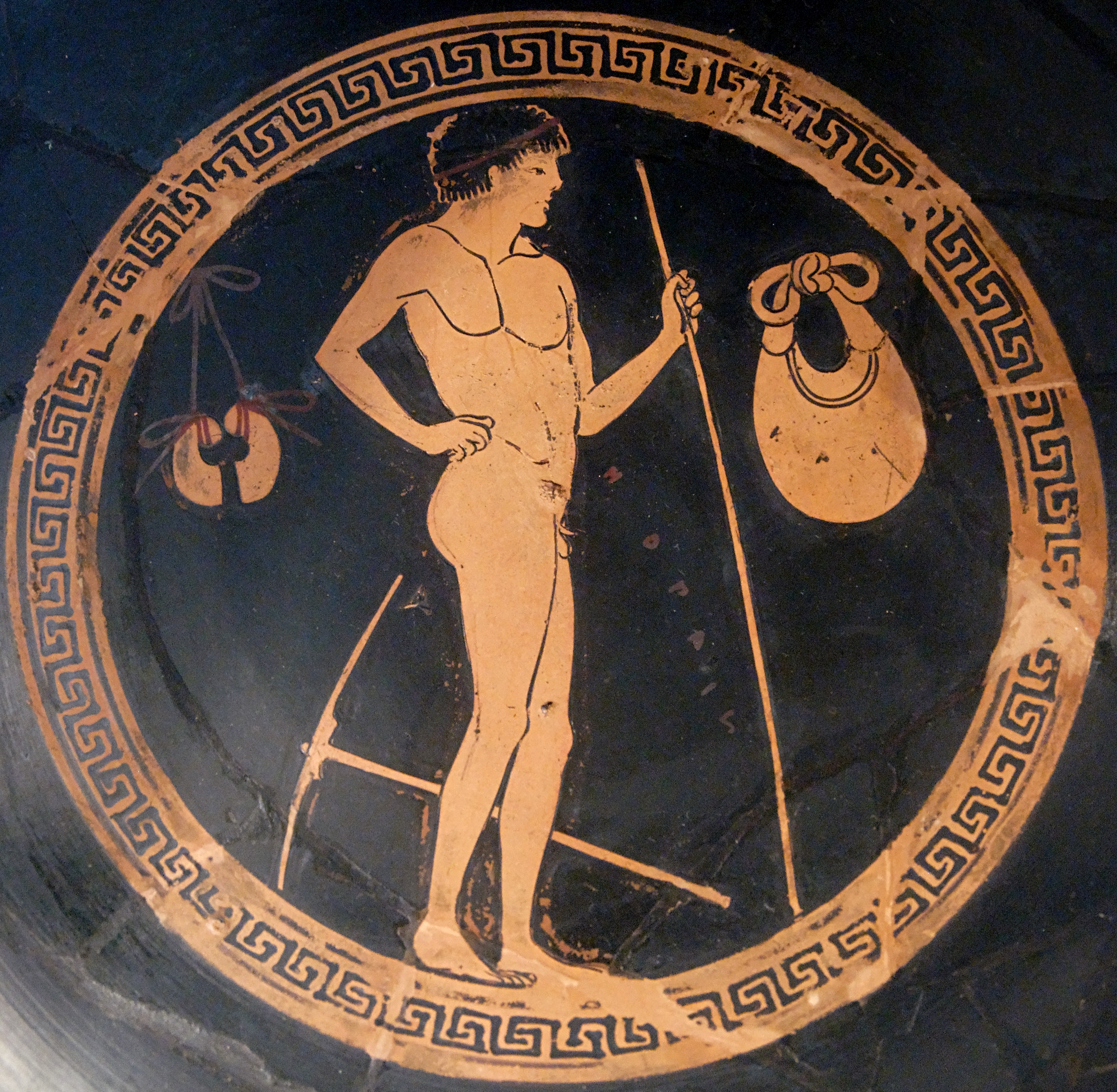
Gymnasium scene: athlete holding a javelin; next to him, a mattock to soften the soil of the jumping pit; jumping weights and a sponge bag hang on the wall. Attic red-figure cup, c. 490 BC

The long jump is perhaps the most unusual, compared to the modern athletics version. A long jumper used weights called halteres to propel himself farther out of standing, and his jump probably consisted of five separate leaps, more like the modern triple jump; otherwise, distances of known jumps (which are often as far as 50 feet) would seem to be impossible.

The javelin, like the discus, was thrown for length, but in addition there was a second section of it where they threw for accuracy. The javelin was a lighter, longer version of a war spear. The "ekebolon" was the event won by distance. The "stochastikon" was the event based on accuracy.

The javelin throw used a leather strap, called an amentum, rather than having the athlete grip the shaft of the javelin itself. Competitors in the javelin and discus throws were allowed five throws each, and only their longest throw would count. The long jump was also attempted five times. In the classical games, it was traditional for all of these events to be performed naked.

In the discus throw the athlete must throw a solid bronze disc. They usually weighed around nine pounds, although varied in size. They took the longest distance out of five throws.

The stadion was a sprint of approximately 200 yards (or about 180 metres), longer than the modern 100 metres sprint, but shorter than all other ancient running events.

Wrestling was the fifth and last event of the pentathlon. The victor had to wrestle his opponent to the ground. Unlike modern-day wrestling where the entire back must be grounded, any part of the back was sufficient.

Wrestling was held in a sand pit at the Olympic Games outside the Temple of Zeus, while the other events were all held in the stadion (or stadium) from which the name of the race was taken. The basic formats of wrestling and discus throwing were similar to their modern versions, though the discus throw was performed from a raised podium rather than on a level field.

== Winner ==
It is uncertain how the winner was chosen. It was unlikely that a single competitor could triumph in all five of the events. One possibility is that the final event, wrestling, was used to rank a number of contestants who had qualified in the other four events, so that the victor of wrestling would be deemed the pentathlon champion.
