= Dolichos (race) =

Ancient Olympic long-distance running event

The dolichos or dolichus (Δόλιχος, meaning "long race") was a long-distance footrace introduced at the ancient Olympic Games in 720 BC.

Sources vary on the exact length of the race. Most accounts estimate the dolichos covered approximately 12 to 24 lengths of the stadium track, or between 1,400 and 4,800 Greek feet (roughly 4.8 km). On average, this amounted to about 12.5 laps, or 3 miles (4.8 km). The race was conducted similarly to modern long-distance events: runners started and finished inside the stadium, but the course extended through the sanctuary grounds of Olympia.

The course often passed prominent landmarks, including shrines and statues. Notably, athletes would pass by the Nike statue near the temple of Zeus before returning to the stadium.

The dolichos was not as popular as the shorter sprint races, such as the stadion. According to Philostratus, dolichos runners "move almost as if they were walking, holding up their hands in front of them" before executing a final sprint—comparable to the modern "sit-and-kick" strategy seen in Olympic 5,000 and 10,000 meter races.

== Dolichos on coinage ==
Relays commemorative coin featuring the dolichos

The dolichos has been featured in modern commemorative coinage. A notable example is the €10 Greek relays commemorative coin, issued in 2003 to honor the 2004 Summer Olympics. The obverse depicts three modern relay runners with batons, and in the background, three ancient athletes are shown running the dolichos.

== Notable Olympic winners ==
- Acanthus of Sparta: 720 BC
- Ergoteles of Himera: 472 BC
- Ladas of Argos: 460 BC
- Aristeus of Argos: 420 BC
- Sotades of Crete: 384 BC
- Malacus of Macedonia: 329 BC
- Aegeus of Argos: 328 BC
- Polites of Ceramus: 69 AD

== See also ==
- Ancient Greek units of measurement

== Sources ==
- Golden, Mark. Sport in the Ancient World from A to Z. Routledge, 2003. ISBN 0-415-24881-7.
- Miller, Stephen G. Ancient Greek Athletics: The Events at Olympia, Delphi, Nemea, and Isthmia. Yale University Press, 2004. ISBN 0-300-11529-6.
