= Diaulos (running race) =

Running race in ancient Greece

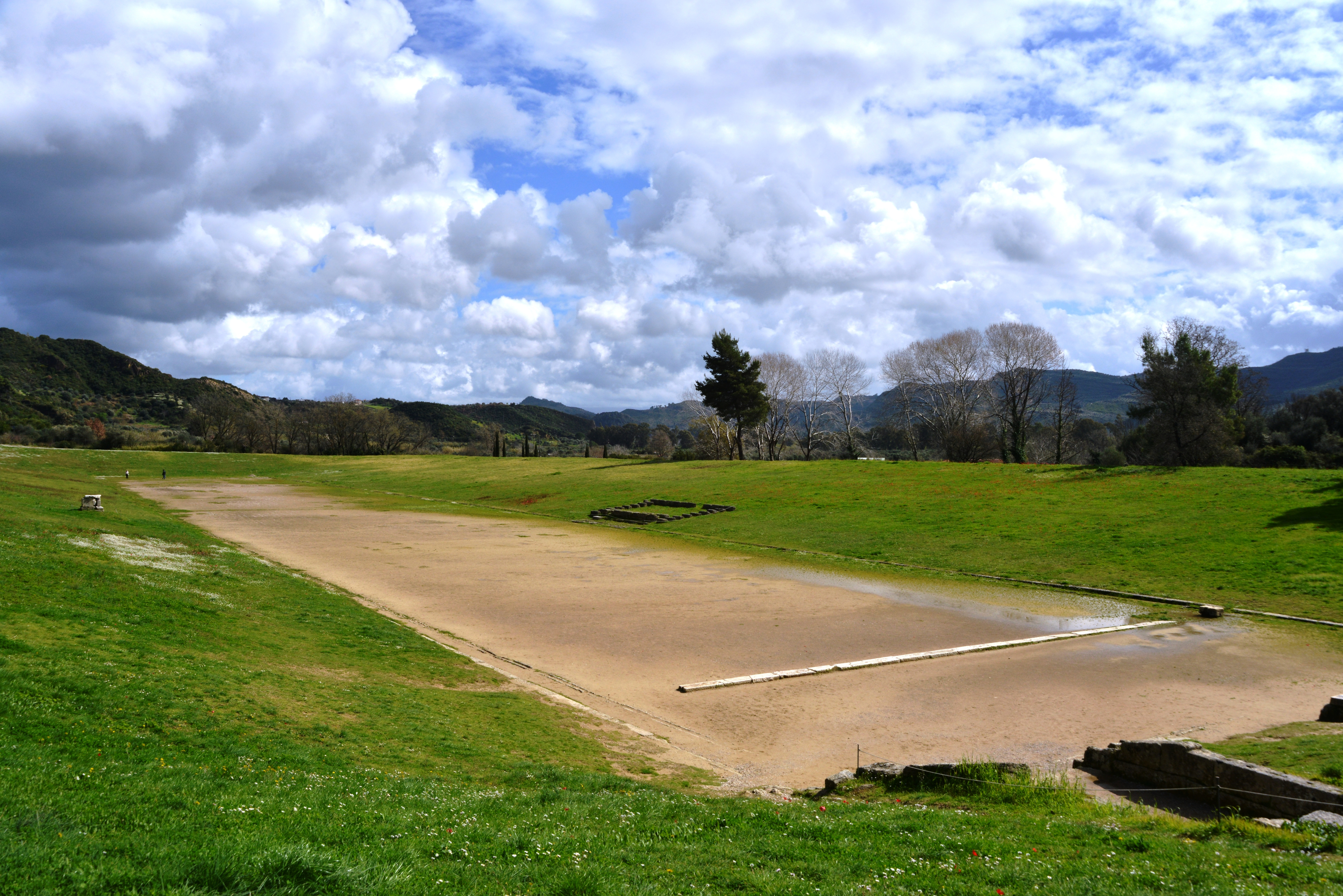
The Stadium at Olympia

The diaulos (Δίαυλος, meaning "double pipe") was a double-stadion footrace of approximately 400 metres (1,300 feet), introduced in the 14th Olympiad of the ancient Olympic Games in 724 BC.

The exact length of the race varied by venue due to the lack of standardized Greek measurements. For instance, the Stadium at Olympia measured 192.27 metres (630.81 feet), whereas the Stadium of Delphi was 177.5 metres (582.35 feet) long.

Scholars debate whether runners turned around a single post or used individual turning posts (kampteres) on the return leg. A single turning post could have disadvantaged runners in outer lanes, potentially adding 3 to 4 metres (9.8 to 13.1 feet) to their distance. In contrast, inscriptions from Delphi mention "turning-posts" in the plural, and archaeological findings at Nemea also support the use of individual posts.

Functionally, the diaulos resembled the modern 400-metre race. However, distinguishing it from the stadion race in ancient vase paintings is difficult due to visual similarities. One notable exception is a fragment of a Panathenaic amphora bearing the inscription: "I am a diaulos runner."

According to tradition, the first Olympic victor in the diaulos was Hypenus of Pisa. The event was contested exclusively by men at Olympia, Isthmia, and Nemea, while at the Pythian Games, it was open to both men and boys (paides).

Diaulos runners required more stamina than stadion sprinters but were leaner and faster than those in the hoplitodromos—a similar-length race run in full armor. The ancient physician Galen remarked that even the most skilled human runners were slower than gazelles over such distances. Several athletes achieved notable success in the diaulos, such as an Argive runner who claimed four consecutive Olympic victories between 208 and 196 BC. This accomplishment was later eclipsed by Leonidas of Rhodes, who dominated the stadion, diaulos, and hoplitodromos between 164 and 152 BC.

The term diaulos was also applied to a two-lap horse race in the Greek hippodrome.

== Bibliography ==
- Miller, Stephen G., and Ben Schmidt. Ancient Greek Athletics: The Events at Olympia, Delphi, Nemea, and Isthmia. Yale University Press, 2004. ISBN 0-300-11529-6.
- Golden, Mark. Sport in the Ancient World from A to Z. Routledge, 2003. ISBN 0-415-24881-7.
- Gardiner, E. Norman. Athletics of the Ancient World. Oxford: Clarendon Press. ISBN 978-0486424866.
- Sweet, Waldo E. Sport and Recreation in Ancient Greece: A Sourcebook with Translations. New York: Oxford University Press, 1987. ISBN 978-0300063127.
