= Olympic winners of the Archaic period =

Ancient Olympia
- Event: Ancient Olympic Games
- Subject: Ancient Olympic winners
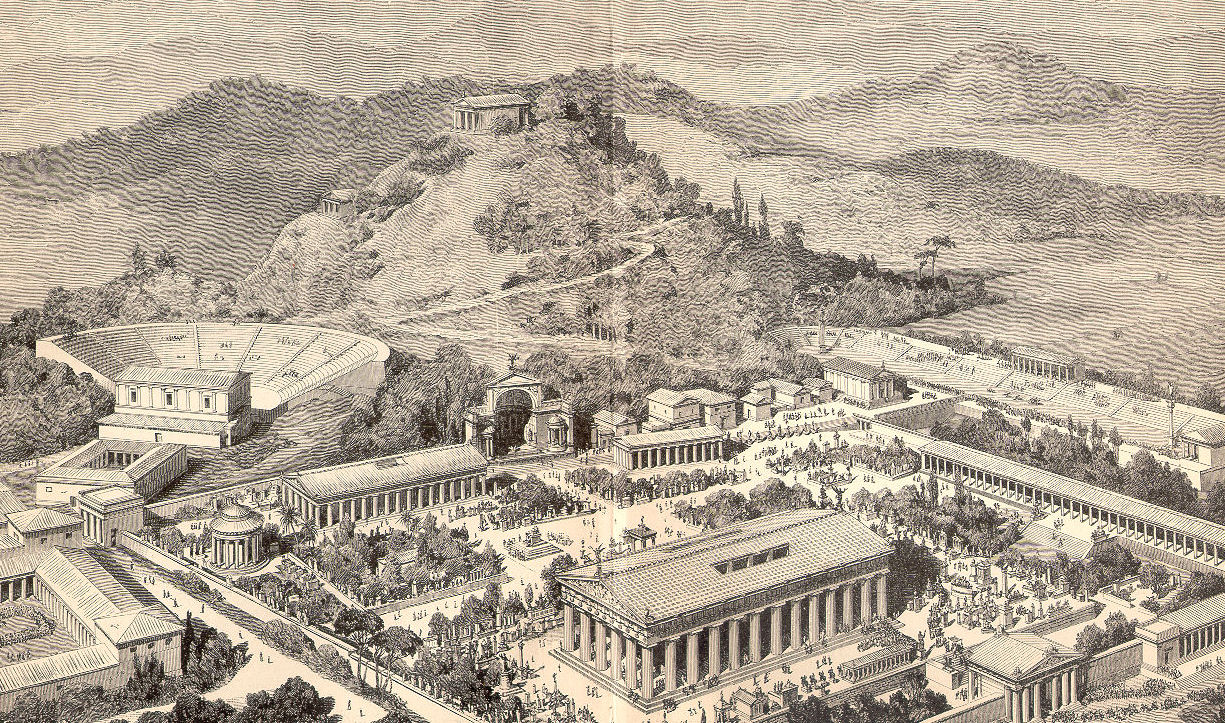

Catalog of the Archaic period
- Period: 776 BC to 480 BC
- Previous: no data available
- Next: Classical period

Just how far back in history organized contests were held remains a matter of debate, but it is reasonably certain that they occurred in Greece almost 3,000 years ago. However ancient in origin, by the end of the 6th century BC at least four Greek sporting festivals, sometimes called "classical games," had achieved major importance: the Olympic Games, held at Olympia; the Pythian Games at Delphi; the Nemean Games at Nemea; and the Isthmian Games, held near Corinth. The Olympic Games were perhaps the greatest of these sporting events, and all Olympian victors were highly appreciated among the Greeks.

== History ==
The sophist Hippias of Elis was the first who drew up the list of Olympians in his work Olympians inscription, based perhaps on the records of Olympia, and the oral tradition memories of the older Olympiads were still live in Olympia. Conventional beginning was considered the Olympiad of 776 BC, when Coroebus of Elis win the foot race named stadion. The work of Hippias revised and continued in the 4th century BC by Aristotle, later by Eratosthenes, then by Phlegon of Tralles (Seleucia of Caria) and many others. Thus formed a kind of Olympians' chronicle, which was already in 3rd century BC the base of the ancient dating system. (Note: According to Encyclopædia Britannica (1911), Chronology (§ Olympiads).) Than younger tables survives complete the list of stadion winners by Sextus Julius Africanus (for the first 249 Olympiads), which included in a book by Eusebius of Caesarea.

== List of Olympic winners in the Archaic period ==
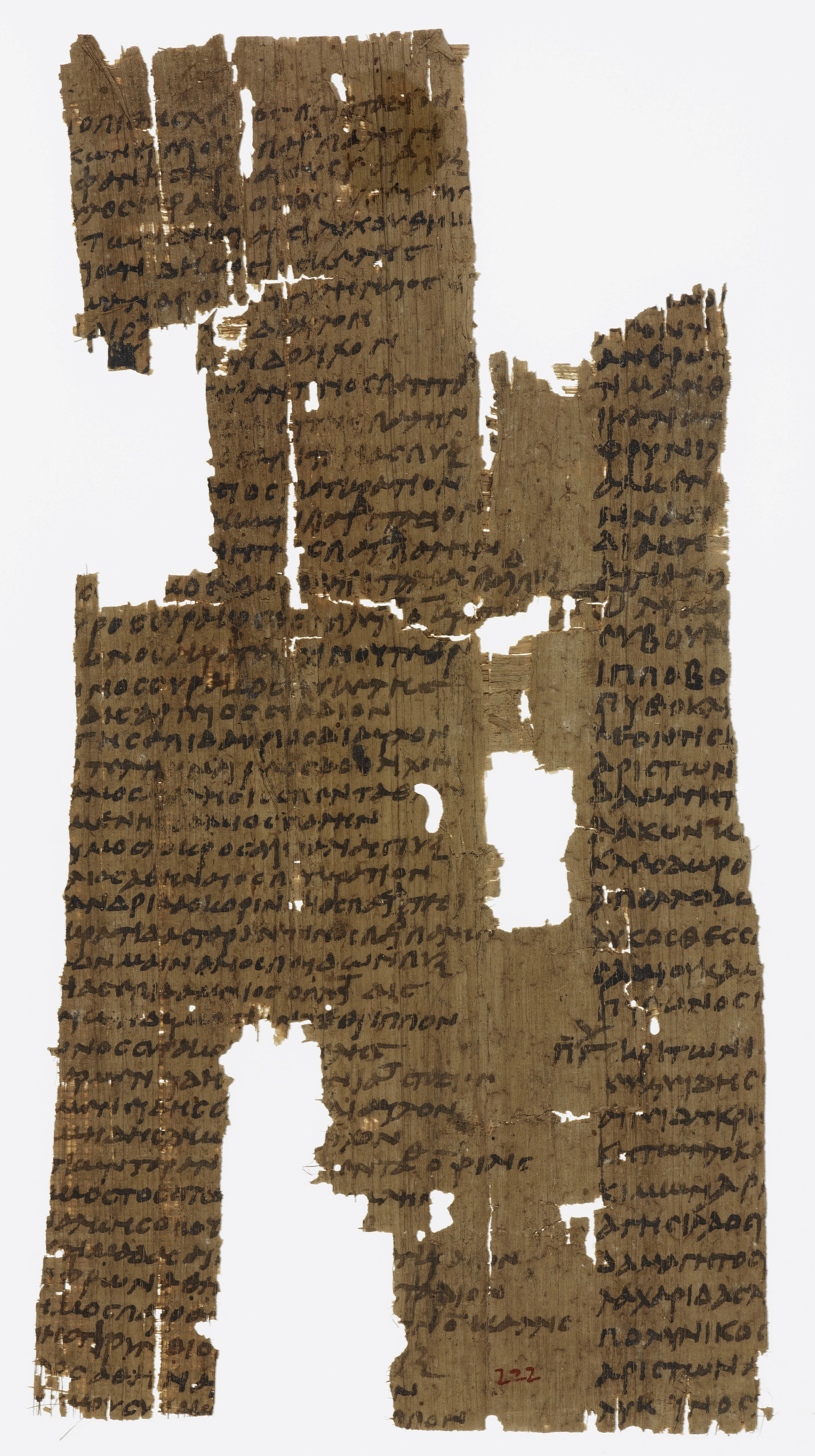
Papyrus Oxyrhynchus 222

The table below is an attempt to give a list (as complete as possible) of Olympic winners in the Archaic period (776 BC to 480 BC) combining all surviving sources. The work is based on records in the surviving historical and literary sources, race inscriptions, the texts of the Oxyrhynchus Papyri, the testimony of Pausanias and the list of Sextus Julius Africanus. The first column shows the serial number of any Olympiad, the second column the same date, the third column contains the game and the fourth column lists the name and origin of the winner, or marked with [...] if the element is not readable on the papyrus and giving whenever possible a version of what could contain when an investigation exists over this element.

Olympiad	Year	Game	Winner	Sources
1st	776 BC	Stadion	Coroebus of Elis	
2nd	772 BC	Stadion	Antimachus of Elis (or of Dyspontium)	
3rd	768 BC	Stadion	Androcles of Messenia (or Androclos)	
4th	764 BC	Stadion	Polychares of Messenia	
5th	760 BC	Stadion	Aeschines of Elis	
6th	756 BC	Stadion	Oebotas of Dyme (or Oebolas)	
7th	752 BC	Stadion	Diocles of Messenia (or Daicles)	
8th (Note: None-Olympiad for Elis. Organized by Pisatans.)	748 BC	Stadion	Anticles of Messenia	
9th	744 BC	Stadion	Xenocles of Messenia (or Xenodocos)	
10th	740 BC	Stadion	Dotades of Messenia	
11th	736 BC	Stadion	Leochares of Messenia	
12th	732 BC	Stadion	Oxythemis of Coronea (or of Cleonea)	
13th	728 BC	Stadion	Diocles of Corinth	
14th	724 BC	Stadion	Desmon of Corinth (or Dasmon)	
		Diaulos	Hypenus of Pisa	
15th	720 BC	Stadion	Orsippus of Megara	
		Dolichos	Acanthus of Laconia	
16th	716 BC	Stadion	Pythagoras of Laconia	
17th	712 BC	Stadion	Polus of Epidaurus	
18th	708 BC	Stadion	Tellis of Sicyon	
		Wrestling	Eurybatus of Laconia	
		Pentathlon	Lampis of Laconia	
19th	704 BC	Stadion	Menus of Megara (or Menon)	
20th	700 BC	Stadion	Atheradas of Laconia	
21st	696 BC	Stadion	Pantacles of Athens	
22nd	692 BC	Stadion	Pantacles of Athens	
		Diaulos	Pantacles of Athens	
23rd	688 BC	Stadion	Icarius of Hyperesia (or Icarus)	
		Boxing	Onomastus of Smyrna (Note: It was Onomastus who established the rules of Boxing, according to Eusebius, p. 196.)	
24th	684 BC	Stadion	Cleoptolemus of Laconia	
25th	680 BC	Stadion	Thalpis of Laconia (or Thalpius)	
		Tethrippon	Pagon of Thebes (or Pagonus)	
26th	676 BC	Stadion	Callisthenes of Laconia	
		Pentathlon	Philombrotus the Lacedaemonian	
27th	672 BC	Stadion	Eurybus of Athens (or Eurybotus or Eurybate)	
		Pentathlon	Philombrotus the Lacedaemonian	
		Boxing	Dahippus of Croton	
		Public Tethrippon	Dyspontium town	
28th	668 BC	Stadion	Chionis of Laconia (or Carmis or Charmis) (Note: According to Eusebius, p. 198, Chionis was not the winner of this Olympiad, but Charmis of Laconia, who trained on a diet of dried figs.)	
		Pentathlon	Philombrotus the Lacedaemonian	
29th	664 BC	Stadion	Chionis of Laconia (or Carmis or Charmis) (Note: Chionis could leap a distance of 22 feet (about 6,71 meters), according to Eusebius, p. 198.)	
		Diaulos	Chionis of Laconia (or Carmis or Charmis)	
30th	660 BC	Stadion	Chionis of Laconia (or Carmis or Charmis)	
		Diaulos	Chionis of Laconia (or Carmis or Charmis)	
31st	656 BC	Stadion	Chionis of Laconia (or Carmis or Charmis)	
		Diaulos	Chionis of Laconia (or Carmis or Charmis)	
32nd	652 BC	Stadion	Cratinus of Megara	
		Boxing	Comaeus of Megara	
33rd	648 BC	Stadion	Gyges of Laconia (or Gylis)	
		Pancratium	Lygdamis of Syracuse	
		Tethrippon	Myron (Tyrant of Sicyon) (Note: Myron, son of Andreas, tyrant of Sicyon, according to Müller, p. 452.)	
		Keles	Crauxidas the Crannonian (or Craxilas)	
34th	644 BC	Stadion	Stomas of Athens	
35th	640 BC	Stadion	Sphaerus the Laconian	
		Diaulos	Cylon of Athens	
36th	636 BC	Stadion orPancratium	Phrynon of Athens	
37th (Note: Were performed for the first time the games for boys.)	632 BC	Stadion	Eurycleidas of Laconia	
		Stadion boys	Polynices of Elis (or Polyneices or Polyneites)	
		Wrestling boys	Hipposthenes of Laconia	
38th	628 BC	Stadion	Olyntheus of Laconia	
		Wrestling boys	Eutelidas the Lacedaemonian (Note: According to Eusebius, p. 199, exceptionally, only in this Olympiad, the boys fought in pancratium, and the name of winner was Deftelidas of Laconia.)	
		Pentathlon boys	Eutelidas the Lacedaemonian	
39th	624 BC	Stadion	Rhipsolaus of Laconia (or Rhipsolcus)	
		Wrestling	Hipposthenes of Laconia	
40th	620 BC	Stadion	Olyntheus of Laconia	
		Wrestling	Hipposthenes of Laconia	
41st	616 BC	Stadion	Cleondas of Thebes (or Cleonidas)	
		Wrestling	Hipposthenes of Laconia	
		Boxing boys	Philotas of Sybaris (or Philytas)	
42nd	612 BC	Stadion	Lycotas of Laconia	
		Wrestling	Hipposthenes of Laconia	
43rd	608 BC	Stadion	Cleon of Epidaurus	
		Wrestling	Hipposthenes of Laconia	
44th	604 BC	Stadion	Gelon the Laconian	
45th	600 BC	Stadion	Anticrates of Epidaurus	
46th	596 BC	Stadion	Crysamaxos of Laconia	
		Stadion boys	Polymnestor of Miletus	
47th	592 BC	Stadion	Eurycles of Laconia	
		Tethrippon	Megacleus of Athens	
48th	588 BC	Stadion	Glaucias of Croton (or Glycon)	
		Boxing	Pythagoras of Samos	
49th	584 BC	Stadion	Lycinus of Croton	
50th	580 BC	Stadion	Epitelidas of Laconia	
51st	576 BC	Stadion	Eratosthenes of Croton	
52nd	572 BC	Stadion	Agis of Elis	
		Pancratium	Arrhichion of Phigalia (or Arrhachion)	
		Tethrippon	Cleisthenes (Tyrant of Sicyon)	
53rd	568 BC	Stadion	Agnon of Peparethus (or Hagnon)	
		Pancratium	Arrhichion of Phigalia (or Arrhachion)	
54th	564 BC	Stadion	Hippostratus of Croton	
		Pancratium	Arrhichion of Phigalia (or Arrhachion)	
		Keles	Callius of Athens (son of Phaenhippus)	
55th	560 BC	Stadion	Hippostratus of Croton	
56th	556 BC	Stadion	Phaedrus of Pharsalus	
		Boxing	[...] the Lacedaemonian (son of Chilon of Sparta) (Note: Chilon died of happiness after the victory of his son (according to Diogenes, ch. III (Chilon), pp. 72-73).)	
57th	552 BC	Stadion	Ladromus of Laconia	
58th	548 BC	Stadion	Diognetus of Croton	
59th	544 BC	Stadion	Archilochus of Corcyra	
		Boxing	Praxidamas of Aegina	
60th	540 BC	Stadion	Apellaeus of Elis	
		Boxing boys	[...]creon of Kea	
		Wrestling boys	Milo of Croton	
61st	536 BC	Stadion	Agatharchus of Corcyra	
		Pancratium	Rexibius of Opous	
62nd	532 BC	Stadion	Eryxias of Chalcis (or Eryxidas)	
		Wrestling	Milo of Croton (Note: He won six times at the Olympic games, six times at the Pythian games, ten times at the Isthmian games, and nine times at the Nemean games, according to Eusebius p. 202.)	
		Pancratium orBoxing	Eurymenes of Samos	
		Tethrippon	Cimon Coalemos (son of Stesagoras of Athens)	
63rd	528 BC	Stadion	Parmenides of Camarina	
		Wrestling	Milo of Croton	
		Tethrippon	Peisistratos of Athens (son of Hippocrates)	
64th	524 BC	Stadion	Evander of Thessaly (or Menander)	
		Wrestling	Milo of Croton	
		Tethrippon	Cimon Coalemos (son of Stesagoras of Athens)	
65th	520 BC	Stadion	Anochus of Tarentum (or Anochas)	
		Diaulos	Anochus of Tarentum (or Anochas)	
		Hoplitodromos	Damaretus of Heraea (or Demaretus)	
		Wrestling	Milo of Croton	
		Boxing boys	Glaukos of Carystos	
		Tethrippon	[...] of Thebes	
66th	516 BC	Stadion	Ischyrus of Himera	
		Hoplitodromos	Damaretus of Heraea (or Demaretus)	
		Wrestling	Milo of Croton	
		Pancratium	Timasitheus of Delphi	
		Tethrippon	Cleosthenes of Epidamnus (or the Illyrian)	
67th	512 BC	Stadion	Phanas of Pellene	
		Diaulos	Phanas of Pellene	
		Hoplitodromos	Phanas of Pellene	
		Pancratium	Timasitheus of Delphi	
		Wrestling	Timasitheus of Croton	
68th	508 BC	Stadion	Isomachus of Croton (or Ischomachus)	
		Hoplitodromos	Phrikias of Pellene	
		Wrestling	Calliteles of Laconia	
		Keles	[Sons of Pheidolas of Corinth]	
69th	504 BC	Stadion	Isomachus of Croton (or Ischomachus)	
		Diaulos orDolichos	Thessalos of Corinth	
		Hoplitodromos	Phrikias of Pellene	
		(unknown game)	Titas of [...]	
70th	500 BC	Stadion	Nicasias of Opus (or Nicaestas or Nicias)	
		Stadion boys	Philon of Corcyra	
		Boxing boys	Agametor of Mantineia	
		Apene	Thersius of Thessaly	
71st	496 BC	Stadion	Tisicrates of Croton	
		Boxing	Kleomedes of Astypalaia	
		Wrestling	Exaenetus of Agrigento	
		Keles	Empedocles of Agrigento (son of Exaenetus)	
		Kalpe	Pataecus of Dyme	
72nd	492 BC	Stadion	Tisicrates of Croton	
		(foot race)	Hippokleas of Pelinna	
		Keles	Crocon ο Eretria	
73rd	488 BC	Stadion	Astylos of Croton (or Astyalus)	
		Diaulos	Astylos of Croton (or Astyalus)	
		Hoplitodromos orDolichos	Hippocleas of Pelinna	
		Pentathlon	Euthycles of Lokroi	
		Stadion boys	Asopichos of Orchomenos	
		Boxing boys	Agiadas of Elis	
		Keles	Hieron of Syracuse	
		Tethrippon	Gelon (Tyrant of Syracuse)	
74th	484 BC	Stadion	Astylos of Croton (as of Syracuse)	
		Diaulos	Astylos of Croton (as of Syracuse)	
		Hoplitodromos	Mnaseas of Cyrene	
		Dolichos	[Dromeus of Stymphalia]	
		Wrestling	Theopompus of Heraea	
		Pancratium	Agias of Pharsalus	
		Boxing	Euthymos of Locri (or the Italian)	
		Tethrippon	Polypeithes of Laconia	
75th	480 BC	Stadion	Astylos of Croton (as of Syracuse)	
		Diaulos	Astylos of Croton (as of Syracuse)	
		Hoplitodromos	Astylos of Croton (as of Syracuse)	
		Dolichos	[Dromeus of Stymphalia]	
		Wrestling	Theopompus of Heraea	
		Boxing	Theagenes of Thasos	
		Pancratium	[Dromeus of Mantineia]	
		Stadion boys	[Xe]nopithes of Chios	
		Wrestling boys	[...]con of Argos	
		Boxing boys	[...]phanes of Heraea	
		Tethrippon	[Dae]tondas and Arsilochus of Thebes	
		Public Keles	Argos town	

== Supplementary list ==
The supplementary list contains Olympic winners of this period known from literary and epigraphic records, but who have been dated only approximately and cannot be included in specific Olympiads.

Chronology	Game	Winner	Sources
700 BC to 650 BC	Dolichos	Phanas of Messenia	
c. 636 BC	Stadion	Arytamas of Laconia	
612 BC to 592 BC	Tethrippon	Alcmaeon of Athens (son of Megacles)	
672 BC to 532 BC	Tethrippon	Euagoras the Lacedaemonian (three consecutive times)	
late 7th or early 6th century BC	Tethrippon	Periandros of Corinth (son of Cypselus of Corinth)	
early 6th century BC	Wrestling	Hetoimocles of Laconia (son of Hipposthenes) (five times)	
572 BC to 528 BC	Boxing	Tisandros of Sicilian Naxos (four consecutive times)	
c. 560 BC	Tethrippon	Miltiades of Athens (son of Cypselus of Athens)	
550 BC to 500 BC	Keles	Pheidolas of Corinth	
c. 520 BC	(unknown game)	Philippus of Croton (son of Butacides)	
late 6th century BC	Tethrippon	Pantares the Sicilian (son of Menecrates of Gela)	
510 BC to 491 BC	Tethrippon	Demaratus (King of Sparta)	
c. 500 BC	Pentathlon	Akmatidas the Lacedaemonian	
c. 500 BC	Stadion boys	Meneptolemos of Apollonia	
5th century BC	(unknown game)	Damarchos of Parrhasia	
early 5th century BC	Keles	Echecrates of Pharsalus (or Echecratidas)	
early 5th century BC	Pentathlon	Theopombus of Heraea (son of Damaretos) (two times)	
500 BC to 488 BC	Boxing	Philon of Corcyra (two times)	
500 BC to 484 BC	Tethrippon	Callius of Athens (son of Hipponicus) (three times)	
c. 488 BC	Boxing	Diognetus of Croton	
c. 484 BC	Wrestling	Telemachus of Pharsalus	
before 484 BC	(unknown game)	Praxiteles of Syracuse	
before 480 BC	Boxing boys	Epikradios of Mantineia	
492 BC to 480 BC	Pentathlon	Hieronymos of Andros	
500 BC to 476 BC	Apene	Anaxilas (Tyrant of Region)	
500 BC to 450 BC	Boxing boys	Protolaus of Mantineia	

== Sources ==
- Diogène de Laerte. Des Philosophes (in Greek and French). Vol. I. Paris: Charpentier (1847). pp. 72–74.
- Eusebius of Caesarea. Chronicon: Olympiads of the Greeks. Schoene-Petermann. pp. 191–220.
- "Archaic Hellenism". History of Hellenic Nation (in Greek). Vol. 2. Athens Publishing. 1971. pp. 502–507. ISBN 960-213-097-0. OCLC 636806977. OL 18546042M. "Athens Academy Award 1980"
- Foundation of Hellenic World. "The Olympic Victors". "Archaic Era."
- Karl Otfried Müller (1839). The history and antiquities of the Doric race. Vol. 2. Translated by Lewis, George Cornewall; Tufnell, Henry. London: Murray (Robarts - University of Toronto). pp. 446–462 App. VI.

== See also ==
- List of ancient olympic victors
- Ancient Olympics in various places
- Olive wreath
- Olympic judges
