= 124 BC =

124 BC in various calendars
- Gregorian calendar: 124 BC; CXXIV BC
- Ab urbe condita: 630
- Ancient Egypt era: XXXIII dynasty, 200
- Pharaoh: Ptolemy VIII Physcon, 22
- Ancient Greek Olympiad (summer): 164th Olympiad (victor)¹
- Assyrian calendar: 4627
- Balinese saka calendar: N/A
- Bengali calendar: −717 – −716
- Berber calendar: 827
- Buddhist calendar: 421
- Burmese calendar: −761
- Byzantine calendar: 5385–5386
- Chinese calendar: 丙辰年 (Fire Dragon); 2574 or 2367 — to — 丁巳年 (Fire Snake); 2575 or 2368
- Coptic calendar: −407 – −406
- Discordian calendar: 1043
- Ethiopian calendar: −131 – −130
- Hebrew calendar: 3637–3638
- Hindu calendars
- Vikram Samvat: −67 – −66
- Shaka Samvat: N/A
- Kali Yuga: 2977–2978
- Holocene calendar: 9877
- Iranian calendar: 745 BP – 744 BP
- Islamic calendar: 768 BH – 767 BH
- Javanese calendar: N/A
- Julian calendar: N/A
- Korean calendar: 2210
- Minguo calendar: 2035 before ROC 民前2035年
- Nanakshahi calendar: −1591
- Seleucid era: 188/189 AG
- Thai solar calendar: 419–420
- Tibetan calendar: མེ་ཕོ་འབྲུག་ལོ་ (male Fire-Dragon); 3 or −378 or −1150 — to — མེ་མོ་སྦྲུལ་ལོ་ (female Fire-Snake); 4 or −377 or −1149

Year 124 BC was a year of the pre-Julian Roman calendar. At the time it was known as the Year of the Consulship of Longinus and Calvinus (or, less frequently, year 630 Ab urbe condita) and the Fifth Year of Yuanshuo. The denomination 124 BC for this year has been used since the early medieval period, when the Anno Domini calendar era became the prevalent method in Europe for naming years.

== Events ==
=== By place ===
==== Roman Republic ====
- Fregellae's revolt against Rome begins in Latium. Later the city is captured and destroyed by the Romans.

==== Parthia ====
- Mithridates II succeeds Artabanus I as King of Parthia.

==== Egypt ====
- Cleopatra II of Egypt and her brother Ptolemy VIII of Egypt reconcile.

==== China ====
- Spring: The Han general Wei Qing, with an army of 30,000 cavalry, proceeds from Gaoque into Xiongnu territory, and in a night attack surrounds the Tuqi King of the Right in his camp. The Tuqi escapes, but numerous petty chiefs are captured in this and a second engagement.
- Li Xi and Zhang Cigong invade Xiongnu territory from Youbeiping Prefecture but encounter no enemy forces.
- Emperor Wu of Han rewards Wei Qing by making him General-in-Chief.
- Autumn: The Xiongnu retaliate by invading the Prefecture of Dai, where they kill its chief commandant, Zhu Ying.

== Deaths ==
- Artabanus I of Parthia
