= 196 BC =

196 BC in various calendars
- Gregorian calendar: 196 BC; CXCVI BC
- Ab urbe condita: 558
- Ancient Egypt era: XXXIII dynasty, 128
- Pharaoh: Ptolemy V Epiphanes, 8
- Ancient Greek Olympiad (summer): 146th Olympiad (victor)¹
- Assyrian calendar: 4555
- Balinese saka calendar: N/A
- Bengali calendar: −789 – −788
- Berber calendar: 755
- Buddhist calendar: 349
- Burmese calendar: −833
- Byzantine calendar: 5313–5314
- Chinese calendar: 甲辰年 (Wood Dragon); 2502 or 2295 — to — 乙巳年 (Wood Snake); 2503 or 2296
- Coptic calendar: −479 – −478
- Discordian calendar: 971
- Ethiopian calendar: −203 – −202
- Hebrew calendar: 3565–3566
- Hindu calendars
- Vikram Samvat: −139 – −138
- Shaka Samvat: N/A
- Kali Yuga: 2905–2906
- Holocene calendar: 9805
- Iranian calendar: 817 BP – 816 BP
- Islamic calendar: 842 BH – 841 BH
- Javanese calendar: N/A
- Julian calendar: N/A
- Korean calendar: 2138
- Minguo calendar: 2107 before ROC 民前2107年
- Nanakshahi calendar: −1663
- Seleucid era: 116/117 AG
- Thai solar calendar: 347–348
- Tibetan calendar: ཤིང་ཕོ་འབྲུག་ལོ་ (male Wood-Dragon) −69 or −450 or −1222 — to — ཤིང་མོ་སྦྲུལ་ལོ་ (female Wood-Snake) −68 or −449 or −1221

Year 196 BC was a year of the pre-Julian Roman calendar. At the time it was known as the Year of the Consulship of Purpureo and Marcellus (or, less frequently, year 558 Ab urbe condita). The denomination 196 BC for this year has been used since the early medieval period, when the Anno Domini calendar era became the prevalent method in Europe for naming years.

== Events ==
=== By place ===
==== Roman Republic ====
- The Insubres, Gauls of the Po Valley, believed by the Romans to have been incited to revolt by Carthage, are finally defeated.
- A new category of Roman priests, the tresviri epulones, are elected to supervise the feasts of the gods; the first three men selected are Gaius Licinius Lucullus, Publius Manlius, and Publius Porcius Laeca.
- At the Isthmian Games at Corinth, the Roman proconsul Titus Quinctius Flamininus proclaims that all Greeks are to be free and governed by their own laws. For this deed he is hailed in many Greek cities as a saviour and accorded homage alongside the gods.
- Flamininus accuses the Spartan ruler, Nabis, of tyranny, takes Gythium in Laconia and forces Nabis to surrender Argos.
- The first triumphal arch built in Rome.

==== Anatolia ====
- According to the Roman scholar and writer Marcus Terentius Varro, the foundation of a library at Pergamum around this time by Eumenes II of Pergamum, combined with an embargo on papyrus by Ptolemy V, leads to the invention of parchment.

==== Egypt ====
- The Rosetta Stone is created. This stone is a Ptolemaic era stele written with the same text in two Egyptian language scripts (hieroglyphic and demotic) and in classical Greek. The translation of the Greek passage reveals that the inscription is a royal edict recording the benefits conferred on Egypt by the pharaoh Ptolemy V Epiphanes at the time of his coronation. This stone will provide the key to the hieroglyphic, or pictographic writing, of ancient Egypt and the decree on it reveals the increasing influence of Egyptian natives, remitted debts and taxes, released prisoners, pardoned rebels who have surrendered, and granted increased benefactions to the temples.

==== Seleucid Empire ====
- Antiochus III's army crosses the Hellespont into Thrace, where he claims sovereignty over territory that has been won by Seleucus I in 281 BC. A war of harassment and diplomacy with Rome ensues. The Romans send ambassadors demanding that Antiochus stay out of Greece and set free all the autonomous communities in Anatolia. To meet these demands would mean Antiochus III giving up the western part of his Seleucid Empire. Thus Antiochus refuses the Romans' demands.

==== China ====
- Empress Lü and Prime Minister Xiao He of the Han dynasty have the former General-in-Chief Han Xin executed, suspecting that he was planning a rebellion in cooperation with the rebel Chen Xi.
- Emperor Gaozu of Han and his generals, including Cao Shen and Zhou Bo, defeat the rebellion of Chen Xi.
- A Han army defeats a raid on the northern frontier by the rogue Xin of Han. Xin is killed in battle.
- Gaozu deposes the king of Liang, Peng Yue, on suspicion of conspiracy. He is then executed on the orders of Empress Lü.
- The king of Huainan, Ying Bu, fearing execution, rebels against the Han dynasty. Gaozu and Cao Shen crush the rebellion but Gaozu is wounded by an arrow, and his health subsequently deteriorates.
- Increasingly paranoid, Gaozu briefly arrests Prime Minister Xiao He but is persuaded to release him.
- Gaozu sends Zhao Tuo, the king of Nanyue in present-day Vietnam and southern China, a seal recognizing his rulership in return for his nominal submission to the Han. Zhao Tuo accepts his vassal status.

== Deaths ==
- Han Xin, Chinese general during the Chu–Han Contention
- Marcus Cornelius Cethegus, Roman consul and censor
- Peng Yue, Chinese general of the Western Han dynasty
- Xin, Chinese king during the Warring States period
