= 552 BC =

552 BC in various calendars
- Gregorian calendar: 552 BC; DLII BC
- Ab urbe condita: 202
- Ancient Egypt era: XXVI dynasty, 113
- Pharaoh: Amasis II, 19
- Ancient Greek Olympiad (summer): 57th Olympiad (victor)¹
- Assyrian calendar: 4199
- Balinese saka calendar: N/A
- Bengali calendar: −1145 – −1144
- Berber calendar: 399
- Buddhist calendar: −7
- Burmese calendar: −1189
- Byzantine calendar: 4957–4958
- Chinese calendar: 戊申年 (Earth Monkey); 2146 or 1939 — to — 己酉年 (Earth Rooster); 2147 or 1940
- Coptic calendar: −835 – −834
- Discordian calendar: 615
- Ethiopian calendar: −559 – −558
- Hebrew calendar: 3209–3210
- Hindu calendars
- Vikram Samvat: −495 – −494
- Shaka Samvat: N/A
- Kali Yuga: 2549–2550
- Holocene calendar: 9449
- Iranian calendar: 1173 BP – 1172 BP
- Islamic calendar: 1209 BH – 1208 BH
- Javanese calendar: N/A
- Julian calendar: N/A
- Korean calendar: 1782
- Minguo calendar: 2463 before ROC 民前2463年
- Nanakshahi calendar: −2019
- Thai solar calendar: −9 – −8
- Tibetan calendar: ས་ཕོ་སྤྲེ་ལོ་ (male Earth-Monkey) −425 or −806 or −1578 — to — ས་མོ་བྱ་ལོ་ (female Earth-Bird) −424 or −805 or −1577

The year 552 BC was a year of the pre-Julian Roman calendar. In the Roman Empire, it was known as year 202 Ab urbe condita. The denomination 552 BC for this year has been used since the early medieval period, when the Anno Domini calendar era became the prevalent method in Europe for naming years.

== Events ==
- The Battle of Hyrba is fought between the Medians and the Persians led by Cyrus the Great.
