= 278 BC =

278 BC in various calendars
- Gregorian calendar: 278 BC; CCLXXVIII BC
- Ab urbe condita: 476
- Ancient Egypt era: XXXIII dynasty, 46
- Pharaoh: Ptolemy II Philadelphus, 6
- Ancient Greek Olympiad (summer): 125th Olympiad, year 3
- Assyrian calendar: 4473
- Balinese saka calendar: N/A
- Bengali calendar: −871 – −870
- Berber calendar: 673
- Buddhist calendar: 267
- Burmese calendar: −915
- Byzantine calendar: 5231–5232
- Chinese calendar: 壬午年 (Water Horse); 2420 or 2213 — to — 癸未年 (Water Goat); 2421 or 2214
- Coptic calendar: −561 – −560
- Discordian calendar: 889
- Ethiopian calendar: −285 – −284
- Hebrew calendar: 3483–3484
- Hindu calendars
- Vikram Samvat: −221 – −220
- Shaka Samvat: N/A
- Kali Yuga: 2823–2824
- Holocene calendar: 9723
- Iranian calendar: 899 BP – 898 BP
- Islamic calendar: 927 BH – 926 BH
- Javanese calendar: N/A
- Julian calendar: N/A
- Korean calendar: 2056
- Minguo calendar: 2189 before ROC 民前2189年
- Nanakshahi calendar: −1745
- Seleucid era: 34/35 AG
- Thai solar calendar: 265–266
- Tibetan calendar: ཆུ་ཕོ་རྟ་ལོ་ (male Water-Horse) −151 or −532 or −1304 — to — ཆུ་མོ་ལུག་ལོ་ (female Water-Sheep) −150 or −531 or −1303

Year 278 BC was a year of the pre-Julian Roman calendar. At the time it was known as the Year of the Consulship of Luscinus and Papus (or, less frequently, year 476 Ab urbe condita). The denomination 278 BC for this year has been used since the early medieval period, when the Anno Domini calendar era became the prevalent method in Europe for naming years.

== Events ==
=== By place ===
==== Seleucid Empire ====
- After their defeats in Greece, the Gauls move into Asia Minor. The Seleucid king Antiochus wins a major battle over the Gauls leading to his being given the title of Soter (Greek for "saviour"). The Gauls settle down to become the "Galatians" and are paid 2,000 talents annually by the Seleucid kings to keep the peace.
- Antigonus concludes a peace with Antiochus who surrenders his claim to Macedonia. Thereafter Antigonus II's foreign policy is marked by friendship with the Seleucids.
- Nicomedes I becomes the first ruler of Bithynia to assume the title of king. He founds the city of Nicomedia, which soon rises to great prosperity.

==== Sicily ====
- The Carthaginians seize an opportunity to interfere in a quarrel between Syracuse and Agrigentum and besiege Syracuse. The Syracusans ask for help from Pyrrhus and Pyrrhus transfers his army there.
- On his arrival in Sicily, Pyrrhus' forces win battles against the Carthaginians across Sicily. Pyrrhus conquers almost all of Sicily except for Lilybaeum (Marsala).
- Pyrrhus is proclaimed king of Sicily. He plans for his son Helenus to inherit the kingdom of Sicily and his other son Alexander to inherit Italy.

==== China ====
- The heartland of the State of Chu in the modern Hubei province is overrun by the powerful state of Qin from the west under Bai Qi's leadership. Sailing down the Han river from Bashu, Bai Qi captures Ying - the capital of Chu - as well as Yiling, and his army reaches as far as Jingling. Bai Qi is honoured as Lord Wu'an (武安君; literally: Lord of Martial Peace). The Chu government moves to the east, occupying various temporary capitals until settling in Shouchun in 241 BC.
- Qu Yuan writes the poem "Lament for Ying" after the fall of the capital of Chu.

== Deaths ==
- Polyaenus of Lampsacus, Greek mathematician and philosopher and friend of Epicurus (b. c. 340 BC)
- Qu Yuan, Chinese poet from southern Chu who lived during the Warring States period. His works are mostly found in an anthology of poetry known as Chu Ci (b. c. 340 BC)
