= Chionis of Sparta =

Ancient Greek athlete

Personal information
- Born: Sparta, Laconia

Sport
- Event(s): Stadion & Diaulos
Medal record
Ancient Greek Olympics
Representing Laconia
Olympic Games
Gold medal – first place	664 BC Olympia	Stadion
Gold medal – first place	664 BC Olympia	Diaulos
Gold medal – first place	660 BC Olympia	Stadion
Gold medal – first place	660 BC Olympia	Diaulos
Gold medal – first place	656 BC Olympia	Stadion
Gold medal – first place	656 BC Olympia	Diaulos

Chionis of Sparta or Chionis of Laconia (Χίονις; /ˈkaɪoʊnɪs/; fl. 7th century BC) was an ancient Greek athlete who won multiple events at the ancient Olympic Games representing the city of Sparta in Laconia. Eusebius of Caesarea lists Chionis as victor in both the stadion and diaulos races at the 29th, 30th and 31st Olympiads (conventionally dated 664–656 BC). Pausanias' Description of Greece credits Chionis with a fourth stadion victory in the 28th games of 668 BC, which Eusebius assigns to Charmis of Sparta. Pausanias says that Chionis was an oikist at Battus of Thera's foundation (631 BC) of Cyrene, Libya. Paul Christesen suggests that claim may, on the one hand, date from much later heroization of Chionis by Sparta's Agiads seeking an alliance with Cyrene, but, on the other hand, may have some basis in fact.

Chionis' record number of Olympic victories was not matched until 480 BC, when Astylos of Croton (representing Syracuse in Sicily) won his third stadion–diaulos double and added a seventh victory by winning the hoplitodromos, a race run in hoplite armour. Pausanias says that in response to Astylos' memorial stele in Olympia, the Spartans amended the inscription on Chionis' stele to point out that there was no hoplitodromos event in his time. Christesen suggests the Spartans may have conflated Charmis with Chionis to inflate Chionis' victories and match Astylos' total, and that this reflected contemporary discord between Sparta and Syracuse under Hiero I. Around this time the Agiads commissioned from Myron statues of Chionis placed at Sparta and Olympia.

Eusebius, probably quoting Sextus Julius Africanus, says Chionis could jump a distance of 52 podes (feet). Frank Zarnowski gives the Olympic foot a value of 32.05 cm, so that Chionis's mark of 16.66 metres (54.7 ft) is longer that the 55 podes achieved by Phayllos of Croton at the Pythian Games — 16.30 metres (53.5 ft) with a Pythian foot of 29.65 cm. In the ancient Olympics, the jump was one of the five components of the pentathlon, an event which Chionis presumably did not win. His alleged distance, nearly double the modern long jump world record, has been variously interpreted as a heroic exaggeration, or relating to something like a triple jump rather than a single jump, or a misreading of the Greek numerals for 22 podes (7.05 metres (23.1 ft)).

== Sources ==
- Christesen, Paul (2010). "Kings Playing Politics: The Heroization of Chionis of Sparta". Historia: Zeitschrift für Alte Geschichte. 59 (1): 26–73. doi:10.25162/historia-2010-0002. ISSN 0018-2311. JSTOR 27809550. S2CID 153251384.
- Zarnowski, Frank (17 April 2013). The Pentathlon of the Ancient World. McFarland. pp. 59–61. ISBN 978-0-7864-6783-9.
