= Pythagoras (boxer) =

Ancient Greek boxer and Olympic winner

Pythagoras of Samos (Greek: Πυθαγόρας ο Σάμιος), as a youth, won the men's boxing event at the ancient Olympic Games.

During the 48th Olympiad, Pythagoras of Samos was excluded from the boys' boxing contest and was mocked for being effeminate, but he went on to the men's contest and defeated all his opponents.

Eratosthenes wrote that Pythagoras introduced new martial arts techniques into boxing, which allowed him to win despite his youth and long hair. He wrote that Pythagoras was "the first to box using technique, in the 48th Olympiad, letting his hair grow long and wearing a purple robe; after being excluded from the boys' games and jeered at, he immediately joined the men's, and won."

While Eratosthenes (and other ancient authors like Duris of Samos) indicated that this boxer was actually the young philosopher Pythagoras of Samos, modern scholarship assumes that the boxer must be a different person because the 48th Olympiad occurred before the birth of the philosopher Pythagoras of Samos. However, recent chronological work by classicist Philip Thibodeau suggests that the boxer was the same person as Pythagoras the philosopher. He presents a set of evidence that the events actually occurred during the 58th Olympiad—a date that would make Pythagoras the philosopher 15 years old at the time (548 BCE). He attributes the misdating to a scribal error. He notes that the philosopher Pythagoras was known to have trained other Olympic athletes, such as Astylus of Croton and the winningest Olympic athlete of all time, Milo of Croton.
