= 340 BC =

340 BC in various calendars
Gregorian calendar	340 BC; CCCXL BC
Ab urbe condita	414
Ancient Egypt era	XXXI dynasty, 4
Pharaoh	Artaxerxes III of Persia, 4
Ancient Greek Olympiad (summer)	110th Olympiad (victor)¹
Assyrian calendar	4411
Balinese saka calendar	N/A
Bengali calendar	−933 – −932
Berber calendar	611
Buddhist calendar	205
Burmese calendar	−977
Byzantine calendar	5169–5170
Chinese calendar	庚辰年 (Metal Dragon); 2358 or 2151 — to — 辛巳年 (Metal Snake); 2359 or 2152
Coptic calendar	−623 – −622
Discordian calendar	827
Ethiopian calendar	−347 – −346
Hebrew calendar	3421–3422
- Hindu calendars
Vikram Samvat	−283 – −282
Shaka Samvat	N/A
Kali Yuga	2761–2762
Holocene calendar	9661
Iranian calendar	961 BP – 960 BP
Islamic calendar	991 BH – 990 BH
Javanese calendar	N/A
Julian calendar	N/A
Korean calendar	1994
Minguo calendar	2251 before ROC 民前2251年
Nanakshahi calendar	−1807
Thai solar calendar	203–204
Tibetan calendar	阳金龙年 (male Iron-Dragon) −213 or −594 or −1366 — to — 阴金蛇年 (female Iron-Snake) −212 or −593 or −1365

Year 340 BC was a year of the pre-Julian Roman calendar. At the time it was known as the Year of the Consulship of Torquatus and Mus (or, less frequently, year 414 Ab urbe condita). The denomination 340 BC for this year has been used since the early medieval period, when the Anno Domini calendar era became the prevalent method in Europe for naming years.

== Events ==
=== By place ===
==== Persian Empire ====
- Rhodes falls to Persian forces.
- Pixodarus, the youngest of the three sons of King Hecatomnus of Caria, gains possession of the satrapy of Caria by expelling his sister Ada, the widow and successor of her brother Idrieus.

==== Greece ====
- When King Philip II of Macedon invaded Perinthus and Byzantium, King Artaxerxes III of Persia sent support to those cities.
- Philip II fails in his siege of Byzantium and is forced to respond to attacks by the Scythians near the mouth of the Danube. His son, Alexander is regent while his father fights against Byzantium and the Scythians.
- The Athenians give Demosthenes a public vote of thanks after Philip's unsuccessful siege of Byzantium.
- c. Derveni papyrus in a nobleman's grave in a necropolis of Lete.

==== Sicily ====
- Hicetas, the tyrant of Leontini, again persuades Carthage to send a large army to Sicily, which lands at Lilybaeum. Timoleon of Syracuse meets this large Carthaginian army in the Battle of the Crimissus in the west of Sicily and achieves a brilliant victory against superior odds. Despite this victory, the Carthaginians continue to occupy the western half of Sicily, with a treaty being concluded that confines the Carthaginians to the area west of the Halycus (Platani) River.

==== Roman Republic ====
- An embassy is sent by the Latin peoples to the Roman Senate asking for the formation of a single republic between Rome and Latium, in which both parties would be considered to be equal. As Rome considers that it is the leader of the Latin League, it refuses to treat the Latin people as being equal politically, or to have Latin people in the Roman Senate. With Rome's refusal of the proposal, the Latin War begins. The Latins fight with the Campanians, while Rome joins the Samnites to attack the Latins. Only the Laurentes in Latium and the equites of Campania remain with the Romans, who, for their part, find support among the Paeligni.
- The Roman-Samnite army under consuls Publius Decius Mus and Titus Manlius Torquatus attack and defeat the Latins and Campanians near Mount Vesuvius in the Battle of Vesuvius.
- The Romans succeed in detaching the Campanians from their alliance with the Latins (through their fear of the Samnites) and induce them to make a separate peace. Three Campanian cities, including Capua and Cumae, are granted Roman citizenship and thus become part of the Roman state. The Roman state now extends to the Bay of Naples.

== Births ==
- Appius Claudius Caecus, Roman politician and consul (approximate date)
- Chandragupta Maurya, founder of the Maurya Empire (approximate date)
- Qu Yuan, Chinese poet and minister (approximate date)

== Deaths ==
- Lais of Hyccara, Greek hetaira (courtesan) (approximate date)
- Mentor of Rhodes, Greek mercenary and satrap (approximate date)
- Xuan of Chu, Chinese king of Chu (Warring States Period)
