= Micion of Boeotia =

Ancient Greek athlete

- Known for: Olympic victor in stadion race (146th Olympiad, 196 BC)

Micion of Boeotia was an ancient Greek athlete listed by Eusebius of Caesarea as a victor in the stadion race of the 146th Olympiad (196 BC). He appears to be only the third Boeotian runner to win at the Olympic Games, following Oxythemis of Coroneia in 732 BC and Cleondas of Thebes in 616 BC.

== See also ==
- Olympic winners of the Stadion race
