= Atheradas of Laconia =

Ancient Greek athlete

Atheradas of Laconia was an ancient Greek athlete listed by Eusebius of Caesarea as a victor in the stadion race of the 20th Olympiad (700 BC). After Pythagoras of Laconia he was the second Spartan to win the stadion, starting a strait of twenty Lacedaemonian titles in 150 years.

== See also ==
- Olympic winners of the Stadion race
