= Sarapion of Alexandria =

Ancient Greek athlete

Sarapion of Alexandria was an ancient Greek athlete listed by Eusebius of Caesarea as a victor in the stadion race of the 204th Olympiad (37 AD). He was the fifth winner of the stadion race from Alexandria in Egypt and the first in the Christian era.

Another Sarapion of Alexandria won the boys boxing in 89 AD.

== See also ==
Olympic winners of the Stadion race
