= Cleondas of Thebes =

Cleondas of Thebes was an ancient Greek athlete listed by Eusebius of Caesarea as a victor in the stadion race of the 41st Olympiad (616 BC). Dionysius of Halicarnassus refers his name as "Kleonidas". He appears to be the only Theban runner to win at the Olympic Games, while there were at least two more Boeotians in the same category: Oxythemis of Coroneia in 732 BC and Micion of Boeotia in 196 BC.

== See also ==
Olympic winners of the Stadion race
