= Gelon of Laconia =

Gelon of Laconia was an ancient Greek athlete listed by Eusebius of Caesarea as a victor in the stadion race of the 44th Olympiad (604 BC). He was already the 13th Spartan winner in a century for a total of 16 titles out of 25 available.

== See also ==
Olympic winners of the Stadion race
