= Phrynon =

Ancient Athenian general and athlete (before 657 BC – c. 606 BC)

- Born: before 657 BC; Athens
- Died: c. 606 BC Sigeion
- Allegiance: Athens

Phrynon of Athens (Greek: Φρύνων ο Αθηναίος; Athens; before 657 BC – c. 606 BC) was a general of ancient Athens, and a winner in ancient Olympic Games.

== Biography ==
Phrynon was born in Athens before 657 BC. In 636 BC, he won the stadion or pentathlon in the Olympic Games (36th Olympiad). Later, he became a general of Athens.

In the period 608–606 BC, a war was conducted by Athens against Mytilene over control of Sigeum. Phrynon was the general of the Athenians. In order to end the conflict quickly, Phrynon accepted the invitation to duel made by the Mytilenean general Pittacus (one of the Seven Sages of Greece). Phrynon was defeated at the duel because Pittacus had a hidden net beneath his shield and with it caught and killed him. Pittacus thus won the war for his homeland. The aristocrat and poet Alcaeus of Mytilene wrote several poems about this conflict.

The Athenian soldiers received the corpse of their general and, withdrawing from Mytilene, carried it back to Athens, where Phrynon was buried with honors.

Herodotus mentions the struggle between Athens and Mytilene in the context of Peisistratos and does not restrict himself to the time of Peisistratos, but freely goes back to an earlier stage of what he says was a protracted struggle. Theodore Wade-Gery notes Phrynon as founder of colonies at Sigeum and Elaious—instead of Achilleion by tradition—and accepting the emendation which produces Phrynon's name at Ps. Skymnos 707f.

== See also ==
- Olympic winners of the Stadion race
