= Anticles =

Ancient Olympic aniticles

Anticles (ancient Greek Αντικλής), from Athens, is listed as a victor in the stadion race of the 110th Olympiad (340 BC). Eusebius of Caesarea refers his name as Anikles, but Diodorus Siculus has Antikles.

== See also ==
- List of Olympic winners of the Stadion race
