= Icarius of Hyperesia =

Icarius of Hyperesia was an ancient Greek athlete listed by Eusebius of Caesarea as a victor in the stadion race of the 23rd Olympiad (688 BC). After Oebotas of Dyme he was the second runner from Achaea to win at the Olympic Games. Pausanias refers to him as Ikaros.

== See also ==
- Olympic winners of the Stadion race
