= Tellis of Sicyon =

Ancient Greek athlete

Tellis of Sicyon was an ancient Greek athlete listed by Eusebius of Caesarea as a victor in the stadion race of the 18th Olympiad (708 BC). He was the first winner from Sicyon.

== See also ==
Olympic winners of the Stadion race
