= Boeotus of Sicyon =

Boeotus of Sicyon was an ancient Greek athlete listed by Eusebius of Caesarea as a victor in the stadion race of the 164th Olympiad (124 BC).

== See also ==
Olympic winners of the Stadion race
