= Epitelidas of Laconia =

Epitelidas of Laconia was an ancient Greek athlete listed by Eusebius of Caesarea as a victor in the stadion race of the 50th Olympiad (580 BC). His victory marked the 20th Spartan triumph in the category during a period of 140 years.

== See also ==
- Olympic winners of the Stadion race
