= Phanas of Pellene =

Phanas of Pellene was an ancient Greek athlete and Olympic winner listed by Eusebius of Caesarea as a victor in the stadion race of the 65th Olympiad (512 BC). He was the first to win all three races, the stadion race, the double race (Diaulos) and the race in full armour (Hoplitodromos).

== See also ==
- Olympic winners of the Stadion race
