= Glycon of Croton =

Glycon of Croton was an ancient Greek athlete listed by Eusebius of Caesarea as a victor in the stadion race of the 48th Olympiad (588 BC). He was the first winner from Magna Graecia. Pausanias relates his name as Glaukias.

== See also ==
Olympic winners of the Stadion race
