= Eurybus of Athens =

Eurybus of Athens (Greek: Εὔρυβος Ἀθηναῖος) was an ancient Greek athlete listed by Eusebius of Caesarea as a victor in the stadion race of the 27th Olympiad (672 BC). His name is also referred as Eurybates or Eurybotos and possibly Eurybotas elsewhere in Pausanias, both of the latter two have been anglicised to "Eurybotus" by editors, although elsewhere the distinction is preserved. He was the second winner from Athens preceded only by Pantacles.

Eurybus was quite possibly the noted discobole Eurybotas depicted on the Chest of Cypselus, which was left as a votive offering at Olympia and was still visible there centuries later and was subject to a detailed description by Pausanias. He does not explicitly say that this discus-thrower Eurybotas is the same as the runner Eurybotos; however, the transcriptions of named personages on the chest as given by Pausanias show Doricisms and traces of having been rendered in the epichoric Corinthian alphabet. Pausanias reports a legend that the infant Cypselus was hidden in the chest during an assassination attempt and later took his name from it (as the Corinthians called these chests kypselai); however, Cypselus's childhood (he died in 627 BC after a thirty-year reign begun when fully adult) coincides with the known date of Eurybatos' stadion victory. But Pausanias does not explicitly connect them, saying merely that whoever Eurybotas is, he is throwing the discus. Frazer compares Pausanias description of the chest to extant examples of Corinthian art and dates the chest to the 7th-early 6th century BCE. The depiction is one of the earliest known of a genre that would later be adapted to statuary, the most famous of which is the Discobolus of Myron and its copies.

Dionysius of Halicarnassus calls the race-winner Eurybates, says that the contemporaneous eponymous archon at Athens was Leostratus, and uses his Olympic victory to date the accession of Tullus Hostilius as King of Rome after the death of Numa Pompilius.

== See also ==
- Olympic winners of the Stadion race
