= Actia =

Ancient Roman festival of Apollo

Actia (Ancient Greek: Ἄκτια) was a festival of Apollo Actius, celebrated at Nicopolis in Epirus, with wrestling, musical contests, horse racing, and sea battles. It was reestablished by Augustus, in commemoration of his victory over Mark Antony off Actium in 31 BC; that it was probably the revival of an ancient festival is suggested by the celebrated temple of Apollo at Actium, which is mentioned by Thucydides, and Strabo, and which was enlarged by Augustus. The games instituted by Augustus were celebrated every five years (πενταετηρίς, ludi quinquennales); they received the title of a sacred agon and were also called Olympia, and ranked next after the four great games of Greece.

Actia were also celebrated at the same time at Rome by the orders of the senate and were also celebrated in other parts of the Roman empire.

== Stadium of Nikopolis ==
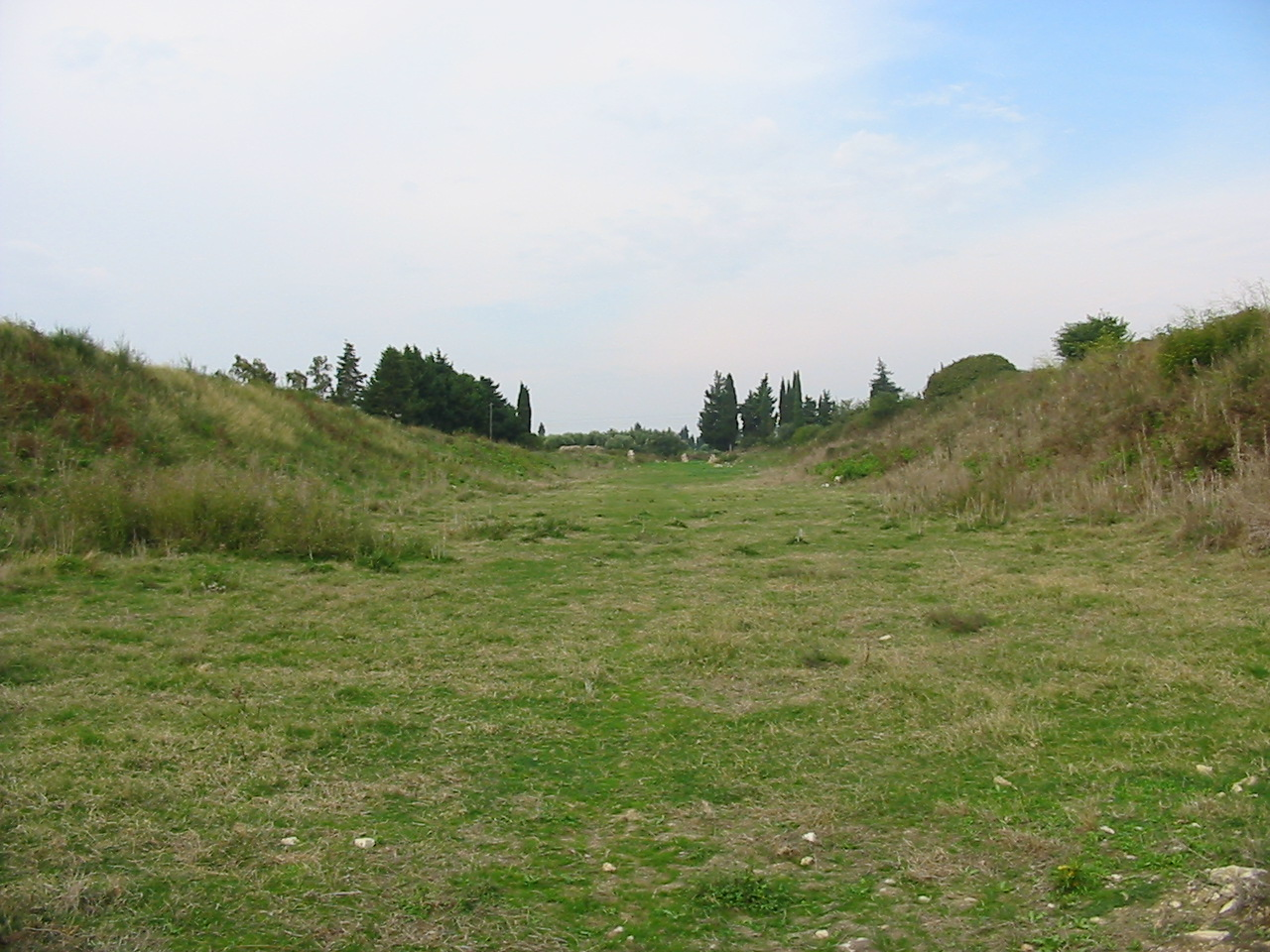
Remains of the stadium at Nikopolis

This ancient stadium was located in the so-called 'Proasteion' (sacred grove) of the Graeco-Roman city of Nikopolis. Together with the nearby gymnasium, theatre and hippodrome it was the location of the famous Actian Games. These games, which featured athletic, equestrian and musical events, were first held in 27 BC to celebrate the victory of the first Roman emperor Augustus over his adversaries, Marc Antony and his Egyptian wife Cleopatra. They were held every four years up to the mid-3rd century AD. Dating from just after the city's foundation, the ancient stadium of Nikopolis has two semicircular ends (sphendones), typical of the amphitheatre type that was in use during the first 200 years of the principate. The stadiums of ancient Laodikeia (near Pamukkale, Turkey) and Aphrodisias (Geyre, Turkey) have a similar architecture.

The north side of the stadium, which must have held a capacity of at least 10,000 spectators, was built on the side of a hill, while artificial deposits were used for the other sides. The walls were made of a rubble core faced with several courses of bricks. On the west side of the stadium were three apsidal entrances leading to the gymnasium, the central one larger than the others. The entrances in the sphendone at the east led to the theatre nearby. On the sphendone at the south side there were residential rooms and facilities for athletes and spectators (inns, shops, lodgings etc.)

Locals call this stadium to karavi, meaning 'the ship', which of course relates to the structure's shape. Archaeological investigations are still regularly undertaken in and around the stadium today.
