= Ladromus of Laconia =

Ladromus of Laconia was an ancient Greek athlete listed by Eusebius of Caesarea as a victor in the stadion race of the 57th Olympiad (552 BC). He was the last Spartan runner during their period of dominance, winning the 21st title in 170 years. The next Spartan crown in the stadion race would be won more than 200 years later by Demosthenes of Laconia in 316 BC.

== See also ==
Olympic winners of the Stadion race
