= Charmis =

Charmis (Ancient Greek: Χάρμις), is an ancient Greek masculine name. Two notable historical figures bore this name:

- Charmis of Marseilles, a physician.
- Charmis of Laconia, an Olympic victor at the 28th Olympiad (668 BCE), who won the stadion race. He trained on a diet of dried figs. That year, the games were held by the inhabitants of Pisa, as Elis was occupied with a war in the west.
