= Xenophon of Corinth =

5th-century BC Greek Olympic victor

Xenophon of Corinth, son of Thessalus, was a victor at the Olympic Games, both in the foot-race and in the pentathlon, in the 79th Olympiad (464 BC). His family belonged to the stock of the Oligaethidae, and was one of the ruling families of Corinth. Pindar's 13th Olympic Ode celebrates his double victory.
