= Pythagoras of Laconia =

8th century BC Greek athlete

Pythagoras of Laconia was an ancient Greek athlete listed by Eusebius of Caesarea as a victor in the stadion race of the 16th Olympiad (716 BC).

He was the first Spartan winner of the stadion race, but his crown was not the first Lacedaemonian victory, because Acanthus of Sparta won the diaulos and the dolichos four years earlier.

According to Plutarch, Pythagoras later met the Roman king Numa Pompilius to introduce some Spartan influence on early Roman society.

== See also ==
- Olympic winners of the Stadion race
