= List of Olympic winners of the Stadion race =

Ancient Olympia
- Event: Ancient Olympic Games
- Subject: Ancient Olympic winners
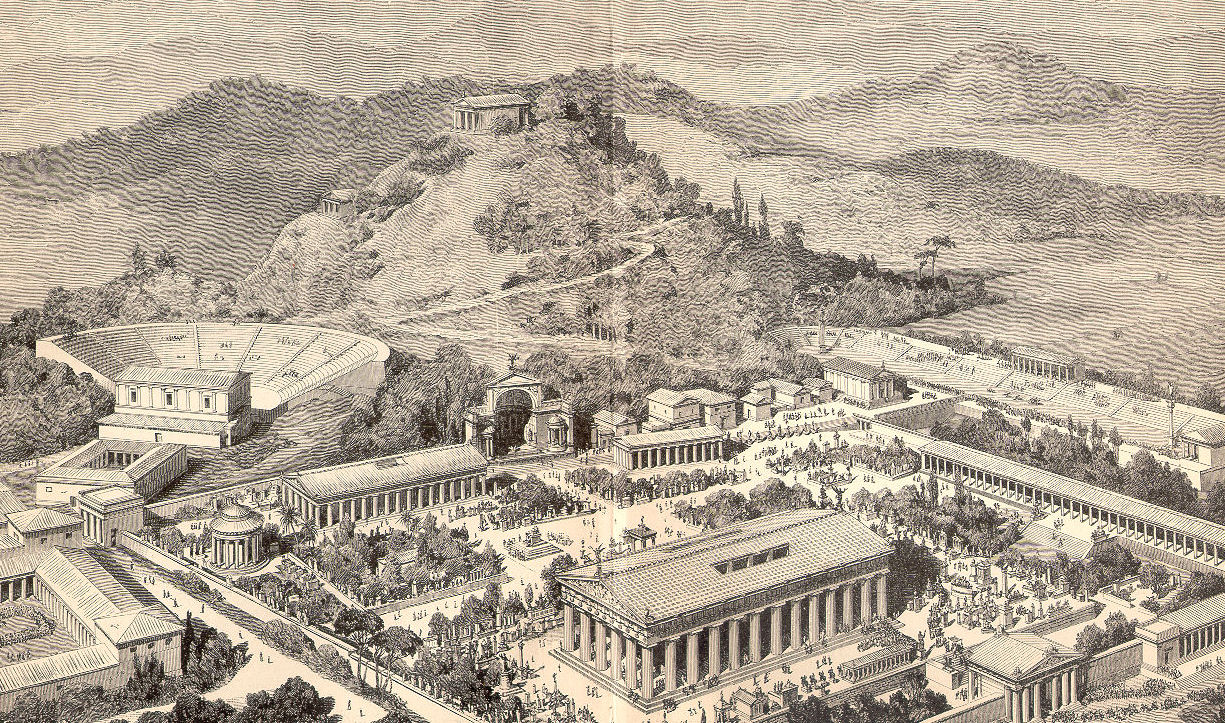

Winners of the stadion race
- Period: 776 BC to 225 AD

The following is a list of winners of the stadion race at the Olympic Games from 776 BC to 225 AD. It is based on the list given by Eusebius of Caesarea using a compilation by Sextus Julius Africanus. The Stadion race was the first and most important competition of the ancient Olympiads and the names of the winners are used by many Greek authors to date historic events.

- 1st Olympiad 776 BC - Coroebus of Elis
- 2nd Olympiad 772 BC - Antimachus of Elis
- 3rd Olympiad 768 BC - Androclus of Messenia
- 4th Olympiad 764 BC - Polychares of Messenia
- 5th Olympiad 760 BC - Aeschines of Elis
- 6th Olympiad 756 BC - Oebotas of Dyme
- 7th Olympiad 752 BC - Diocles of Messenia (Ancient Greek: Διοκλῆς Μεσήνιος; called Daïcles, Ancient Greek: Δαϊκλῆς Μεσσήνιος, in Dionysius's chronicle)
- 8th Olympiad 748 BC - Anticles of Messenia
- 9th Olympiad 744 BC - Xenocles of Messenia
- 10th Olympiad 740 BC - Dotades of Messenia
- 11th Olympiad 736 BC - Leochares of Messenia
- 12th Olympiad 732 BC - Oxythemis of Cleonae or Coroneia
- 13th Olympiad 728 BC - Diocles of Corinth
- 14th Olympiad 724 BC - Desmon of Corinth
- 15th Olympiad 720 BC - Orsippus of Megara
- 16th Olympiad 716 BC - Pythagoras of Laconia
- 17th Olympiad 712 BC - Polus of Epidaurus
- 18th Olympiad 708 BC - Tellis of Sicyon
- 19th Olympiad 704 BC - Menus of Megara
- 20th Olympiad 700 BC - Atheradas of Laconia
- 21st Olympiad 696 BC - Pantacles of Athens - In 692 BC he also won the diaulos. He was the first winner from Athens and the first runner in history to defend his title four years after his first victory.
- 22nd Olympiad 692 BC - Pantacles for a second time
- 23rd Olympiad 688 BC - Icarius of Hyperesia
- 24th Olympiad 684 BC - Cleoptolemus of Laconia
- 25th Olympiad 680 BC - Thalpis of Laconia
- 26th Olympiad 676 BC - Callisthenes of Laconia
- 27th Olympiad 672 BC - Eurybus of Athens (Ancient Greek: Εὔρυβος Ἀθηναῖος; called Eurybates, Ancient Greek: Εὐρυβάτης by Dionysius)
- 28th Olympiad 668 BC - Charmis of Laconia
- 29th Olympiad 664 BC - Chionis of Laconia
- 30th Olympiad 660 BC - Chionis for a second time
- 31st Olympiad 656 BC - Chionis for a third time
- 32nd Olympiad 652 BC - Cratinus of Megara
- 33rd Olympiad 648 BC - Gylis of Laconia
- 34th Olympiad 644 BC - Stomas of Athens - He was the third winner from Athens and his name is only referred by Eusebius.
- 35th Olympiad 640 BC - Sphaerus of Laconia (Ancient Greek: Σφαῖρος Λάκων)
- 36th Olympiad 636 BC - Phrynon of Athens
- 37th Olympiad 632 BC - Eurycleidas of Laconia
- 38th Olympiad 628 BC - Olyntheus of Laconia
- 39th Olympiad 624 BC - Rhipsolaus of Laconia
- 40th Olympiad 620 BC - Olyntheus of Laconia for a second time
- 41st Olympiad 616 BC - Cleondas of Thebes
- 42nd Olympiad 612 BC - Lycotas of Laconia
- 43rd Olympiad 608 BC - Cleon of Epidaurus
- 44th Olympiad 604 BC - Gelon of Laconia
- 45th Olympiad 600 BC - Anticrates of Epidaurus
- 46th Olympiad 596 BC - Chrysamaxus of Laconia
- 47th Olympiad 592 BC - Eurycles of Laconia
- 48th Olympiad 588 BC - Glycon of Croton
- 49th Olympiad 584 BC - Lycinus of Croton
- 50th Olympiad 580 BC - Epitelidas of Laconia
- 51st Olympiad 576 BC - Eratosthenes of Croton
- 52nd Olympiad 572 BC - Agis of Elis
- 53rd Olympiad 568 BC - Hagnon of Peparethus
- 54th Olympiad 564 BC - Hippostratus of Croton
- 55th Olympiad 560 BC - Hippostratus for a second time
- 56th Olympiad 556 BC - Phaedrus of Pharsalus
- 57th Olympiad 552 BC - Ladromus of Laconia
- 58th Olympiad 548 BC - Diognetus of Croton
- 59th Olympiad 544 BC - Archilochus of Corcyra
- 60th Olympiad 540 BC - Apellaeus of Elis
- 61st Olympiad 536 BC - Agatharchus of Corcyra
- 62nd Olympiad 532 BC - Eryxias of Chalcis
- 63rd Olympiad 528 BC - Parmenides of Camarina
- 64th Olympiad 524 BC - Menander of Thessaly
- 65th Olympiad 520 BC - Anochas of Tarentum
- 66th Olympiad 516 BC - Ischyrus of Himera
- 67th Olympiad 512 BC - Phanas of Pellene
- 68th Olympiad 508 BC - Isomachus of Croton
- 69th Olympiad 504 BC - Isomachus for a second time
- 70th Olympiad 500 BC - Nicasias of Opus
- 71st Olympiad 496 BC - Tisicrates of Croton
- 72nd Olympiad 492 BC - Tisicrates for a second time
- 73rd Olympiad 488 BC - Astyalus of Croton
- 74th Olympiad 484 BC - Astyalus for a second time
- 75th Olympiad 480 BC - Astyalus for a third time
- 76th Olympiad 476 BC - Scamander of Mytilene
- 77th Olympiad 472 BC - Dandes of Argos
- 78th Olympiad 468 BC - Parmenides of Poseidonia
- 79th Olympiad 464 BC - Xenophon of Corinth
- 80th Olympiad 460 BC - Torymmas of Thessaly
- 81st Olympiad 456 BC - Polymnastus of Cyrene
- 82nd Olympiad 452 BC - Lycus of Larissa
- 83rd Olympiad 448 BC - Crisson of Himera
- 84th Olympiad 444 BC - Crisson for a second time
- 85th Olympiad 440 BC - Crisson for a third time
- 86th Olympiad 436 BC - Theopompus of Thessaly
- 87th Olympiad 432 BC - Sophron of Ambracia
- 88th Olympiad 428 BC - Symmachus of Messana
- 89th Olympiad 424 BC - Symmachus for a second time
- 90th Olympiad 420 BC - Hyperbius of Syracuse
- 91st Olympiad 416 BC - Exagentus of Acragas
- 92nd Olympiad 412 BC - Exagentus for a second time
- 93rd Olympiad 408 BC - Eubatus of Cyrene
- 94th Olympiad 404 BC - Crocinas of Larissa
- 95th Olympiad 400 BC - Minon of Athens - Using his victory to date historic events, Diodorus Siculus reports his name as Minos.
- 96th Olympiad 396 BC - Eupolemos of Elis
- 97th Olympiad 392 BC - Perieres of Terina or Terinaeus of Elis ?
- 98th Olympiad 388 BC - Sosippus of Delphi
- 99th Olympiad 384 BC - Dicon of Syracuse
- 100th Olympiad 380 BC - Dionysodorus of Tarentum
- 101st Olympiad 376 BC - Damon of Thurii
- 102nd Olympiad 372 BC - Damon for a second time
- 103rd Olympiad 368 BC - Pythostratus of Ephesus
- 104th Olympiad 364 BC - Phocides of Athens - listed by Eusebius of Caesarea as a victor in the stadion race (Diodor) or wrestling contest (Eusebius) of the 104th Olympiad (364 BC). His victory is used by Diodorus Siculus to date the events of his history.
- 105th Olympiad 360 BC - Porus of Cyrene
- 106th Olympiad 356 BC - Porus for a second time
- 107th Olympiad 352 BC - Smicrinas of Tarentum
- 108th Olympiad 348 BC - Polycles of Cyrene
- 109th Olympiad 344 BC - Aristolochus of Athens - His victory is used by Diodorus Siculus to date the events of his history.
- 110th Olympiad 340 BC - Anticles of Athens
- 111th Olympiad 336 BC - Cleomantis of Cleitor
- 112th Olympiad 332 BC - Gryllus of Chalcis
- 113th Olympiad 328 BC - Cliton of Macedonia
- 114th Olympiad 324 BC - Micinas of Rhodes
- 115th Olympiad 320 BC - Damasias of Amphipolis
- 116th Olympiad 316 BC - Demosthenes of Laconia
- 117th Olympiad 312 BC - Parmenides of Mytilene
- 118th Olympiad 308 BC - Andromenes of Corinth
- 119th Olympiad 304 BC - Andromenes for a second time
- 120th Olympiad 300 BC - Pythagoras of Magnesia-on-Maeander
- 121st Olympiad 296 BC - Pythagoras for a second time
- 122nd Olympiad 292 BC - Antigonus of Macedonia
- 123rd Olympiad 288 BC - Antigonus for a second time
- 124th Olympiad 284 BC - Philomelus of Pharsalus
- 125th Olympiad 280 BC - Ladas of Aegium
- 126th Olympiad 276 BC - Idaeus or Nicator of Cyrene
- 127th Olympiad 272 BC - Perigenes of Alexandria
- 128th Olympiad 268 BC - Seleucus of Macedonia
- 129th Olympiad 264 BC - Philinus of Cos
- 130th Olympiad 260 BC - Philinus for a second time
- 131st Olympiad 256 BC - Ammonius of Alexandria
- 132nd Olympiad 252 BC - Xenophanes of Amphissa in Aetolia
- 133rd Olympiad 248 BC - Simylus of Neapolis
- 134th Olympiad 244 BC - Alcides of Laconia
- 135th Olympiad 240 BC - Eraton of Aetolia
- 136th Olympiad 236 BC - Pythocles of Sicyon
- 137th Olympiad 232 BC - Menestheus of Barcyla
- 138th Olympiad 228 BC - Demetrius of Alexandria
- 139th Olympiad 224 BC - Iolaidas of Argos - He was the second winner from Argos in the category.
- 140th Olympiad 220 BC - Zopyrus of Syracuse
- 141st Olympiad 216 BC - Dorotheus of Rhodes
- 142nd Olympiad 212 BC - Crates of Alexandria
- 143rd Olympiad 208 BC - Heracleitus of Samos
- 144th Olympiad 204 BC - Heracleides of Salamis in Cyprus
- 145th Olympiad 200 BC - Pyrrhias of Aetolia
- 146th Olympiad 196 BC - Micion of Boeotia
- 147th Olympiad 192 BC - Agemachus of Cyzicus
- 148th Olympiad 188 BC - Arcesilaus of Megalopolis
- 149th Olympiad 184 BC - Hippostratus of Seleuceia in Pieria
- 150th Olympiad 180 BC - Onesicritus of Salamis
- 151st Olympiad 176 BC - Thymilus of Aspendus
- 152nd Olympiad 172 BC - Democritus of Megara
- 153rd Olympiad 168 BC - Aristander of Antissa in Lesbos
- 154th Olympiad 164 BC - Leonidas of Rhodes, victor in all three racing competitions
- 155th Olympiad 160 BC - Leonidas for a second time
- 156th Olympiad 156 BC - Leonidas for a third time
- 157th Olympiad 152 BC - Leonidas, victor in three races for a fourth time, was the first and only man to win 12 Olympic crowns over four Olympiads.
- 158th Olympiad 148 BC - Othon of Syracuse
- 159th Olympiad 144 BC - Alcimus of Cyzicus
- 160th Olympiad 140 BC - Agnodorus of Cyzicus
- 161st Olympiad 136 BC - Antipater of Epirus
- 162nd Olympiad 132 BC - Damon of Delphi
- 163rd Olympiad 128 BC - Timotheus of Tralles
- 164th Olympiad 124 BC - Boeotus of Sicyon
- 165th Olympiad 120 BC - Acusilaus of Cyrene
- 166th Olympiad 116 BC - Chrysogonus of Nicaea
- 167th Olympiad 112 BC - Chrysogonus for a second time
- 168th Olympiad 108 BC - Nicomachus of Philadelphia
- 169th Olympiad 104 BC - Nicodemus of Lacedaemon
- 170th Olympiad 100 BC - Simmias of Seleuceia-on-Tigris
- 171st Olympiad 96 BC - Parmeniscus of Corcyra
- 172nd Olympiad 92 BC - Eudamus of Cos
- 173rd Olympiad 88 BC - Parmeniscus of Corcyra for a second time
- 174th Olympiad 84 BC - Demostratus of Larissa
- 175th Olympiad 80 BC - Epaenetus of Argos, (boys' stadion race) There was no stadion race for adults this year, because Sulla had summoned all the athletes to Rome.
- 176th Olympiad 76 BC - Dion of Cyparissus (Cyparissia in Laconia)
- 177th Olympiad 72 BC - Hecatomnus of Elis
- 178th Olympiad 68 BC - Diocles of Hypopenus
- 179th Olympiad 64 BC - Andreas of Lacedaemon
- 180th Olympiad 60 BC - Andromachus of Ambracia
- 181st Olympiad 56 BC - Lamachus of Tauromenium
- 182nd Olympiad 52 BC - Anthestion of Argos - The third winner from Argos in the category.
- 183rd Olympiad 48 BC - Theodorus of Messene
- 184th Olympiad 44 BC - Theodorus for a second time
- 185th Olympiad 40 BC - Ariston of Thurii
- 186th Olympiad 36 BC - Scamander of Alexandria Troas
- 187th Olympiad 32 BC - Ariston of Thurii again
- 188th Olympiad 28 BC - Sopater of Argos - The fourth winner from Argos in the category.
- 189th Olympiad 24 BC - Asclepiades of Sidon
- 190th Olympiad 20 BC - Auphidius of Patrae
- 191st Olympiad 16 BC - Diodotus of Tyana
- 192nd Olympiad 12 BC - Diophanes of Aeolis
- 193rd Olympiad 8 BC - Artemidorus of Thyateira
- 194th Olympiad 4 BC - Demaratus of Ephesus
- 195th Olympiad 1 AD - Demaratus for a second time
- 196th Olympiad 5 AD - Pammenes of Magnesia-on-Maeander
- 197th Olympiad 9 AD - Asiaticus of Halicarnassus
- 198th Olympiad 13 AD - Diophanes of Prusa
- 199th Olympiad 17 AD - Aeschines Glaucias of Miletus
- 200th Olympiad 21 AD - Polemon of Petra
- 201st Olympiad 25 AD - Damasias of Cydonia
- 202nd Olympiad 29 AD - Hermogenes of Pergamum
- 203rd Olympiad 33 AD - Apollonius of Epidaurus
- 204th Olympiad 37 AD - Sarapion of Alexandria
- 205th Olympiad 41 AD - Eubulidas of Laodiceia
- 206th Olympiad 45 AD - Valerius of Mytilene
- 207th Olympiad 49 AD - Athenodorus of Aegium
- 208th Olympiad 53 AD - Athenodorus for a second time
- 209th Olympiad 57 AD - Callicles of Sidon
- 210th Olympiad 61 AD - Athenodorus of Aegium for a third time
- 211th Olympiad 67 AD - Tryphon of Philadelphia (These games were not held at the usual time because Nero postponed them until his visit to Greece two years later)
- 212th Olympiad 69 AD - Polites of Ceramus
- 213th Olympiad 73 AD - Rhodon of Cyme (or Theodotus)
- 214th Olympiad 77 AD - Straton of Alexandria
- 215th Olympiad 81 AD - Hermogenes of Xanthus
- 216th Olympiad 85 AD - Apollophanes Papis of Tarsus
- 217th Olympiad 89 AD - Hermogenes of Xanthus for a second time
- 218th Olympiad 93 AD - Apollonius of Alexandria (or Heliodorus)
- 219th Olympiad 97 AD - Stephanus of Cappadocia
- 220th Olympiad 101 AD - Achilleus of Alexandria
- 221st Olympiad 105 AD - Theonas Smaragdus of Alexandria
- 222nd Olympiad 109 AD - Callistus of Side
- 223rd Olympiad 113 AD - Eustolus of Side
- 224th Olympiad 117 AD - Isarion of Alexandria
- 225th Olympiad 121 AD - Aristeas of Miletus
- 226th Olympiad 125 AD - Dionysius Sameumys of Alexandria
- 227th Olympiad 129 AD - Dionysius for a second time
- 228th Olympiad 133 AD - Lucas of Alexandria
- 229th Olympiad 137 AD - Epidaurus Ammonius of Alexandria
- 230th Olympiad 141 AD - Didymus Clydeus of Alexandria
- 231st Olympiad 145 AD - Cranaus of Sicyon
- 232nd Olympiad 149 AD - Atticus of Sardis
- 233rd Olympiad 153 AD - Demetrius of Chios
- 234th Olympiad 157 AD - Eras of Chios
- 235th Olympiad 161 AD - Mnasibulus of Elateia
- 236th Olympiad 165 AD - Aeithales of Alexandria
- 237th Olympiad 169 AD - Eudaemon of Alexandria
- 238th Olympiad 173 AD - Agathopus of Aegina
- 239th Olympiad 177 AD - Agathopus for a second time
- 240th Olympiad 181 AD - Anubion Pheidus of Alexandria
- 241st Olympiad 185 AD - Heron of Alexandria
- 242nd Olympiad 189 AD - Magnus Libycus of Cyrene
- 243rd Olympiad 193 AD - Isidorus Artemidorus of Alexandria
- 244th Olympiad 197 AD - Isidorus for a second time
- 245th Olympiad 201 AD - Alexander of Alexandria (20th winner from Alexandria in Egypt and 18th Alexandrian crown during their period of dominance in the 1st and 2nd century.)
- 246th Olympiad 205 AD - Epinicus Cynas of Cyzicus
- 247th Olympiad 209 AD - Satornilus of Gortyn in Crete
- 248th Olympiad 213 AD - Heliodorus Trosidamas of Alexandria (Last winner of the stadion race from Alexandria in Egypt recorded by Eusebius and his second title was the 20th Alexandrian crown in the Christian era)
- 249th Olympiad 217 AD - Heliodorus for a second time
- 250th Olympiad 221 AD - Publius Aelius Alcandridas of Sparta
- 251st Olympiad 225 AD - Publius Aelius Alcandridas of Sparta for a second time
- 252nd Olympiad 229 AD - Demetrius of Salamis
- 253rd Olympiad 233 AD - Demetrius of Salamis for a second time
- 254th Olympiad 237 AD - Demetrius of Salamis for a third time
- 255th Olympiad 241 AD -
- 256th Olympiad 245 AD -
- 257th Olympiad 249 AD -
- 258th Olympiad 253 AD -
- 259th Olympiad 257 AD -
- 260th Olympiad 261 AD -
- 261st Olympiad 265 AD -
- 262nd Olympiad 269 AD - Dionysius of Alexandria

== Sources ==
- Eusebius of Caesarea. Chronicon: Olympiads of the Greeks. Schoene-Petermann. pp. 191–220.

== See also ==
- Ancient Olympics in various places
- Olive wreath
- Olympic judges
