= Olympian 13 =

Olympian 13, 'For Xenophon of Corinth', is an ode by the 5th century BC Greek poet Pindar.

== Background ==
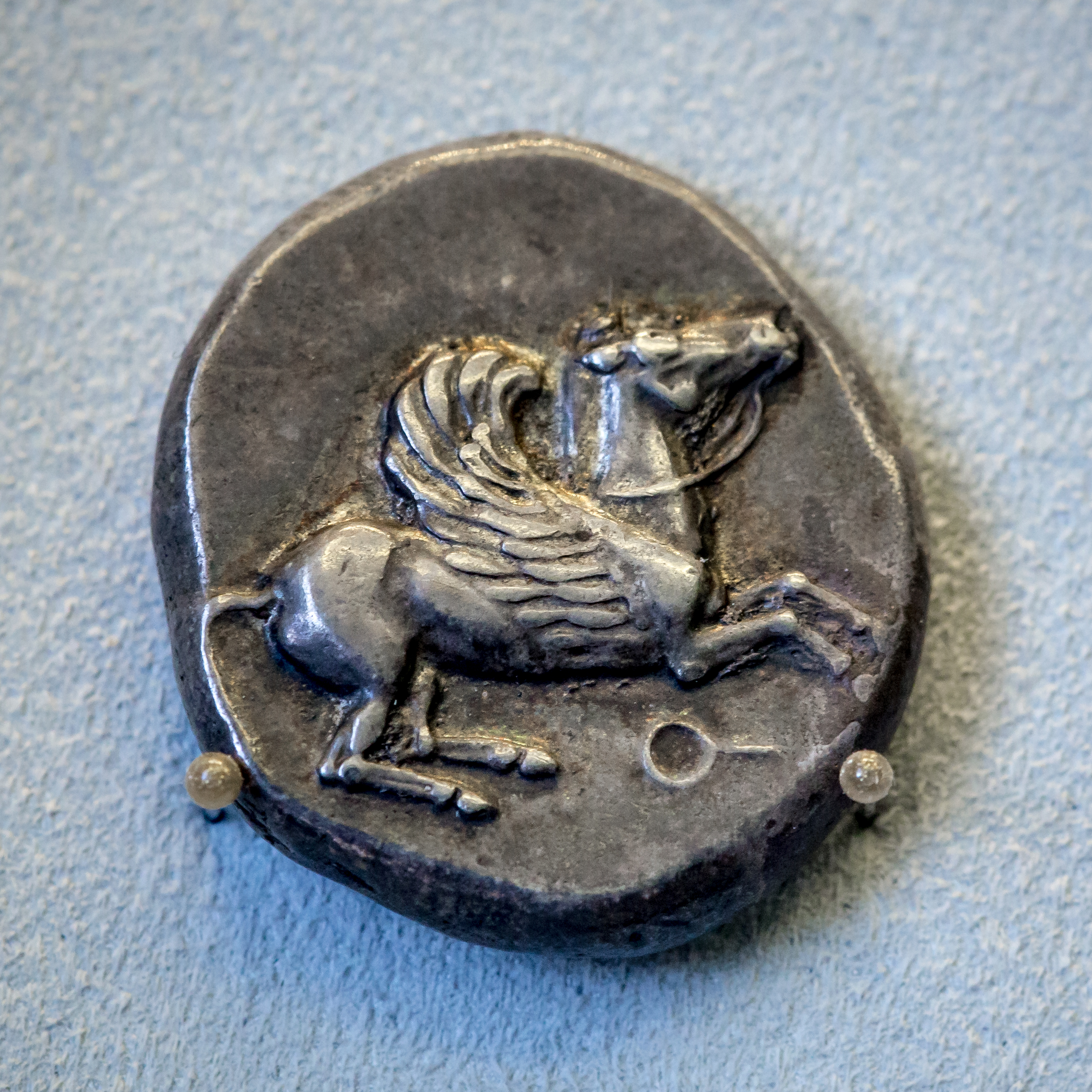
Silver stater of Corinth, 478–458 BC. Pegasus

The father of Xenophon of Corinth won the footrace at Olympia in 504 BC. Xenophon himself is now lauded as having (in 464 BC) performed the unprecedented feat of winning the stadium and the pentathlon on the same day. The stadium was the short foot-race of about 200 yards (180 m); the length of the Olympic stadium was just under 630 feet (190 m). The pentathlon was a contest including five events, which Simonides enumerates as ἅλμα ποδωκείην, δίσκον, ἄκοντα, παλην. The actual order of the events was probably foot-race, long jump, discus, javelin, wrestling. Victory in three events was sufficient, but not necessary. If no competitor won three events, or if two won two events, the prize was probably decided by taking account of second or third places in the several results.

== Summary ==
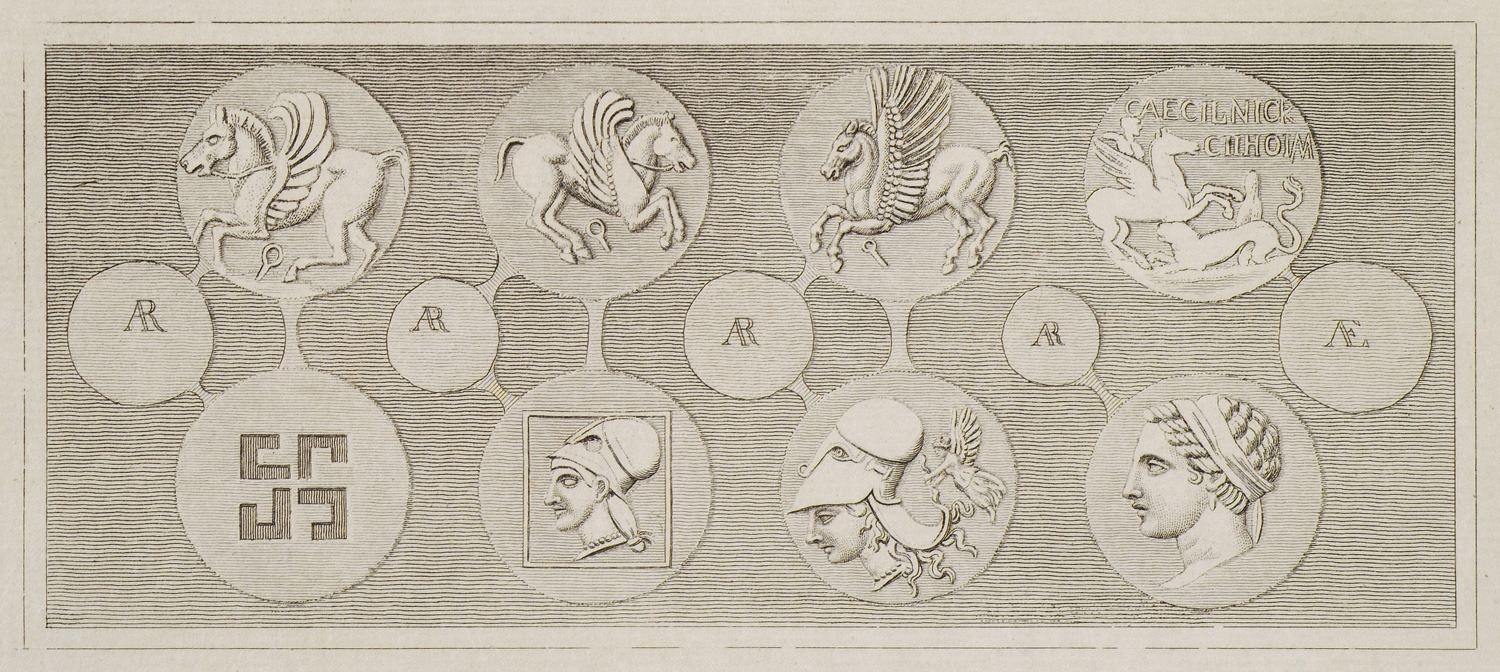
Coins of Corinth: Pegasus; Athena; Persephone; Bellerophon and Chimaera

The praise of the victor's family is bound up with the praise of Corinth (1–5), the dwelling-place of Law and Justice and Peace (6–10). A noble theme must be treated with truthful courage (11 f). Corinth is famed for athletic prowess and inventive spirit: it has invented the dithyramb, the bit, and the adornment of the pediment with the eagle. It is the home of the Muses and of the God of War (13–23). May Zeus preserve the people, and welcome the triumphal chorus in honour of Xenophon's victory in two events, which have never before been won on the same day (24–29). Victories previously won by Xenophon (29–34), and by his father (35–40), and his family (40–46). These victories are as countless as the sand of the sea, but it is now time to make an end of this theme (47 f); and thus the poet returns to the praise of Corinth, and of the famous Corinthians, Sisyphus, Medea, and Glaucus (49–62).

The myth of Bellerophon (63–92). But the poet must not hurl his javelins too often; he therefore checks himself (93–95), and returns to the successes won by the victor's house; ending with a prayer that it may continue to prosper (96–115).

== Sources ==
- Gardiner, E. Norman (1910). Greek Athletic Sports and Festivals. London: Macmillan & Co., Ltd. p. 370.

Attribution:

- Sandys, John, ed. (1915). The Odes of Pindar, including the Principal Fragments. Loeb Classical Library. New York: The Macmillan Co. pp. 130–43.
