= Ancient Greek Olympic festivals =

In Greek antiquity, athletic festivals under the name of "Olympic games", named in imitation of the original Olympic games at Olympia, were held in various places all over the Greek world. Some of these are only known to us by inscriptions and coins; but others, as the Olympic festival at Antioch, obtained great celebrity. After these Olympic festivals had been established in several places, the great Olympic festival itself was sometimes designated in inscriptions by the addition of Pisa.

- Aegae in Macedonia. This festival was in existence in the time of Alexander the Great.
- Alexandria. In later times, the number of Alexandrian conquerors in the great Olympic Games in Elis was greater than from any other state.
- Anazarbus in Cilicia. Lately introduced games.
- Antioch at Daphne, a small place 40 stadia from Antioch, where there was a large sacred grove watered by many fountains. The festival was originally called Daphnea, and was sacred to Apollo and Artemis, but was called Olympia after the inhabitants of Antioch had purchased from the Eleans, in 44 AD, the privilege of celebrating Olympic games. It was not, however, regularly celebrated as an Olympic festival until the time of the emperor Commodus. It commenced on the first day of the month Hyperberetaeus, with which the year of Antioch began. It was under the presidency of an Alytarches. Its celebration was abolished by Justin I in 521 AD. The writings of Libanius, and of Chrysostom, the Christian Father, who lived many years at Antioch, gave various particulars respecting this festival.
- Athens. There were two festivals of the name of Olympia celebrated at Athens, one of which was in existence in the time of Pindar, who celebrates the ancestors of the Athenian Timodemus as conquerors in it, and perhaps much earlier (Schol. ad Thuc. i. 126). It was celebrated to the honour of Zeus, in the spring, between the Great Dionysia and Bendidia (see Bendis). The other Olympic festival at Athens was instituted by Hadrian in 131 AD; from which time a new Olympic era commenced.
- Attalia in Pamphylia. This festival is only known to us by coins.
- Cyzicus in Mysia
- Cyrene in Libya
- Dion in Macedonia. These games were instituted by Archelaus I of Macedon, and lasted nine days, corresponding to the nine Muses. Euripides wrote and presented Bacchae and Archelaus there. They were celebrated with great splendour by Philip II and Alexander the Great.
- Ephesus. According to later inscriptions, in which it is sometimes called Hadriana Olympia en Epheso, this festival was instituted by Hadrian.
- Elis. Besides the great Olympic Games, there appear to have been smaller ones celebrated yearly.
- Magnesia in Lydia
- Neapolis in Naples, Italy
- Nicaea in Bithynia.
- Nicopolis in Epirus. Augustus, after his victory (νίκη) over Mark Antony, off Actium, founded Nicopolis, and instituted games to be celebrated every five years in commemoration of the event. These games are sometimes called Olympic, but more frequently bear the name of Actia. They were sacred to Apollo, and were under the care of the Lacedaemonians (Spartans).
- Olympus on the boundary between Thessaly and Macedonia.
- Pergamos in Mysia
- Side in Pamphylia
- Smyrna. Pausanias mentions an Agon of the Smyrnaeans, which Corsini (Diss. Agon. i. 12. p. 20) supposes to be an Olympic festival. The Marmor Oxoniense expressly mentions Olympia at Smyrna, and it also occurs in inscriptions.
- Tarsus in Cilicia
- Tegea in Arcadia
- Thessalonica in Macedonia
- Thyatira in Lydia
- Tralles in Lydia
- Tyrus in Phoenicia

== Sources ==
- This article incorporates public domain text from A Dictionary of Greek and Roman Antiquities by William Smith, 1875 - ancientlibrary.com^{[usurped]}
- PHI Greek Inscriptions
