= Frank Zarnowski =

American author, historian, and sports announcer

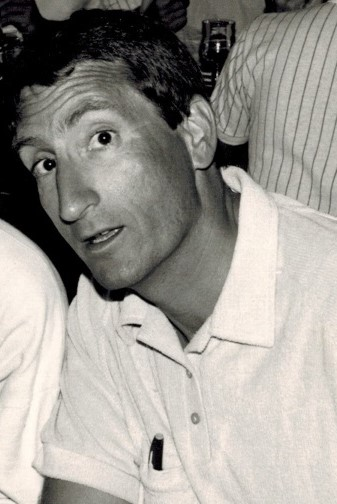
- Born: April 14, 1943 (age 83); York, Pennsylvania, U.S.
- Sports commentary career
- Teams: IOC, USOC, USATF (AAU/TAC), NCAA
- Genres: Public Address Announcer, Writer, Official
- Sports: Track and Field

C. Frank Zarnowski (born April 14, 1943) is an American author, historian, coach, TV commentator, statistician and public address announcer for track and field events, specializing in the decathlon. Since 1970, Zarnowski has coached and announced at national track and field championships. On five occasions between 1975 and 2012, he was the public address announcer when the decathlon world record was set. In addition to publishing the weekly DECA Newsletter, Zarnowski's non-profit website, DECA: The Decathlon Association, is a resource for both the history, rules, and background of the decathlon, as well as up-to-date results from recent events. Several of Zarnowski's books on track and field have been nominated for national awards, including Olympic Glory Denied, and All-Around Men: Heroes of a Forgotten Sport. As a highly regarded authority on the decathlon, Zarnowski also provides expert commentary on the event in print and online media. Zarnowski was professor of economics at Mount St. Mary's University from 1967 to 2008 and has held the same position at Dartmouth College since 2002. He has coached track and field, as well as cross-country, at Lehigh University and Mount St. Mary's University.

Zarnowski was inducted into the National Track and Field Hall of Fame in November 2016.

== Personal life ==
Zarnowski is of Polish descent, born in York, Pennsylvania, on April 14, 1943, to parents Chester and Gertrude.
