= Alytarches =

Alytarches (Greek: ἀλυτάρχης ) in ancient Olympic games was the leader of the police force who assisted the Hellanodikai to impose fines on athletes who did not follow the rules. The rabdouchoi, rod-bearers, and mastigophoroi, scourge-bearers, carried out the punishments. If an athlete could not pay a fine, his hometown paid it for him.

== Sources ==
- Olympic victor lists and ancient Greek history by Paul Christesen Page 510 ISBN 0-521-86634-0
- Sport in the Ancient World from A to Z By Mark Golden Page 7 ISBN 0-415-24881-7
- http://ablemedia.com/ctcweb/consortium/ancientolympics7.html
