= Milo of Croton =

6th-century BC wrestler from the Magna Graecian city of Croton

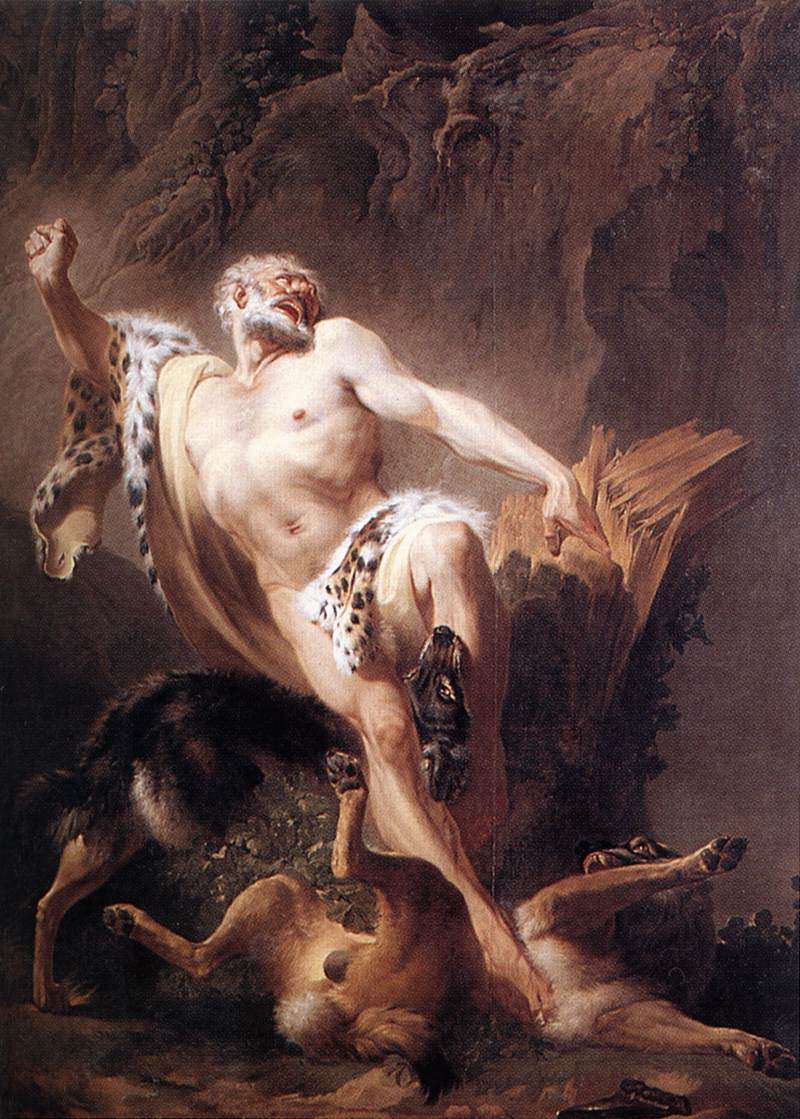
Milo of Croton by Joseph-Benoît Suvée (18th century, oil on canvas), depicting Milo with his hand stuck in a trunk, attacked by a wolf.

Milo or Milon of Croton (fl. 540 – 511 BC) was a famous ancient Greek athlete from Croton, which is today in the Magna Graecia region of southern Italy.

Milo was a six-time winner at the Olympics, once for boys' wrestling in 540 BC at the 60th Olympics and later five times for wrestling at the 62nd to 66th Olympics. He continued competing long after what would have been considered a normal Olympic athlete's prime, and would have been over 40 years of age by the 67th Olympiad. He also attended many of the Pythian Games. His historicity is attested by many classical authors, among them Aristotle, Pausanias, Cicero, Herodotus, Vitruvius, Epictetus, and the author of the Suda, but there are many legendary stories surrounding him.

Diodorus Siculus wrote in his history that Milo was a follower of Pythagoras who commanded the Crotonian army which defeated the Sybarites in 511 BC, while wearing his Olympic wreaths and dressed like Heracles in a lion's skin and carrying a club:

Hereupon the Sybarites took the field with an army of three hundred thousand men. The Crotonians had but an hundred thousand, which were commanded by Milo the wrestler, who at the first onset put to flight that wing of the army which was opposite to him: for he was of invincible strength, and had courage answerable to his strength, and had been seven times victor at the olympic games; when he began his fight, he was crowned with olympic wreaths, wearing (like Hercules) a lion's skin and a club; at last he gained an absolute victory, and thereupon was much admired by his countrymen.

Milo's death, said to have occurred by wolves or a lion whilst his fingers were trapped in a tree stump he was trying to help someone split, became a popular subject in art in late Italian Renaissance sculpture; it continued to around 1900 and allowed the sculptor to show his skill in a dramatic anatomical pose, being a more compact equivalent of the Roman Laocoön and His Sons.

== Feats of strength ==
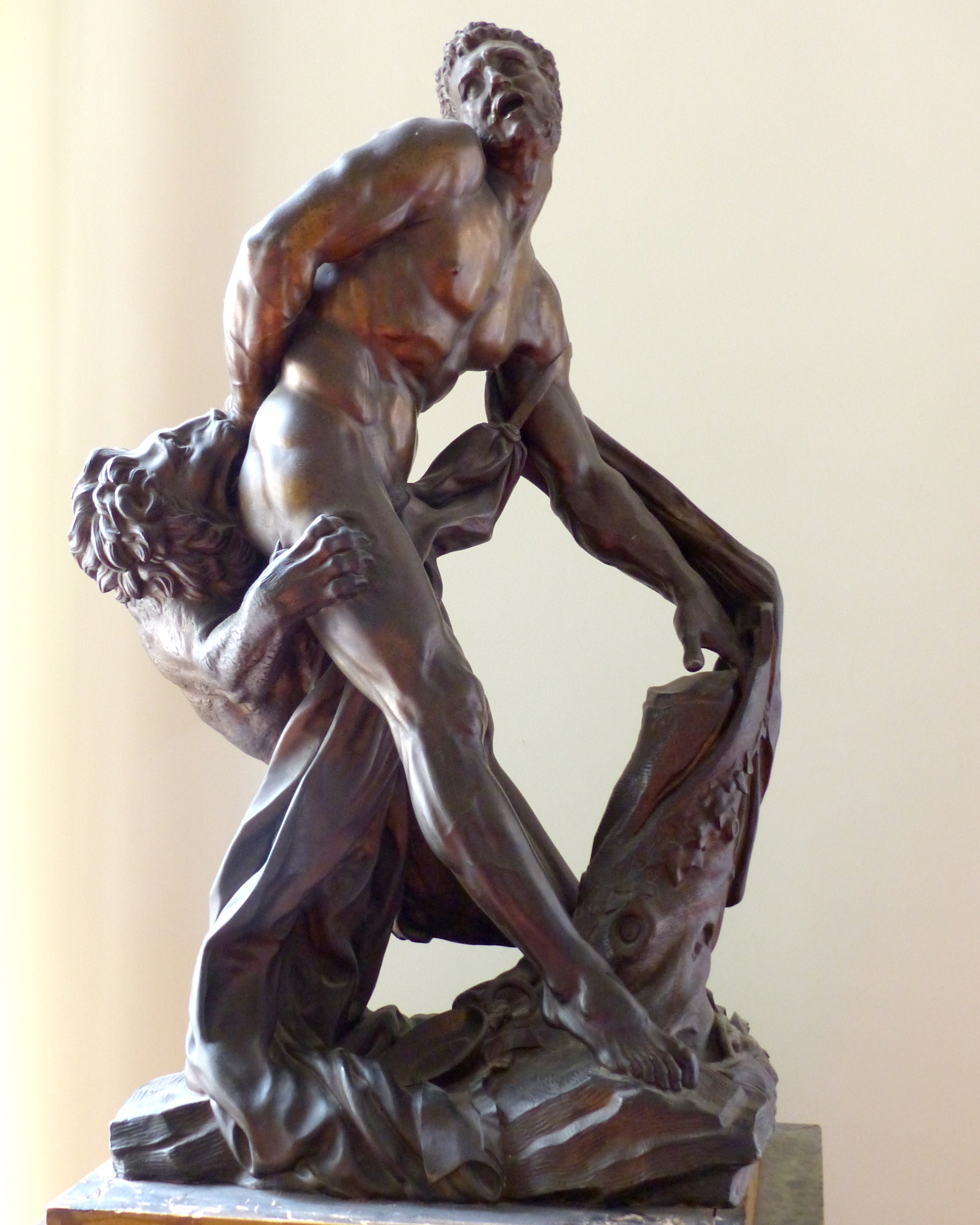
Milo of Croton by Pierre Puget. Bronze replica.

Ancient sources and legends report that Milo took great pleasure in showing off his strength. He had a number of feats he would perform, such as holding out his arm with his fingers outstretched and challenging people to attempt to bend his little finger, standing on a greased iron disk and challenging people to push him off it, and holding a pomegranate in one hand and challenging others to take it from him; nobody ever succeeded, and the fruit was never damaged despite him holding it very tightly.

In what would become his most famous feat of strength, Milo trained in the off-years by carrying a newborn calf on his back every day until the Olympics took place, by which time he would be carrying a four-year-old cow on his back; he then carried the adult cow the length of the stadium before killing, roasting, and eating it.

== Death ==
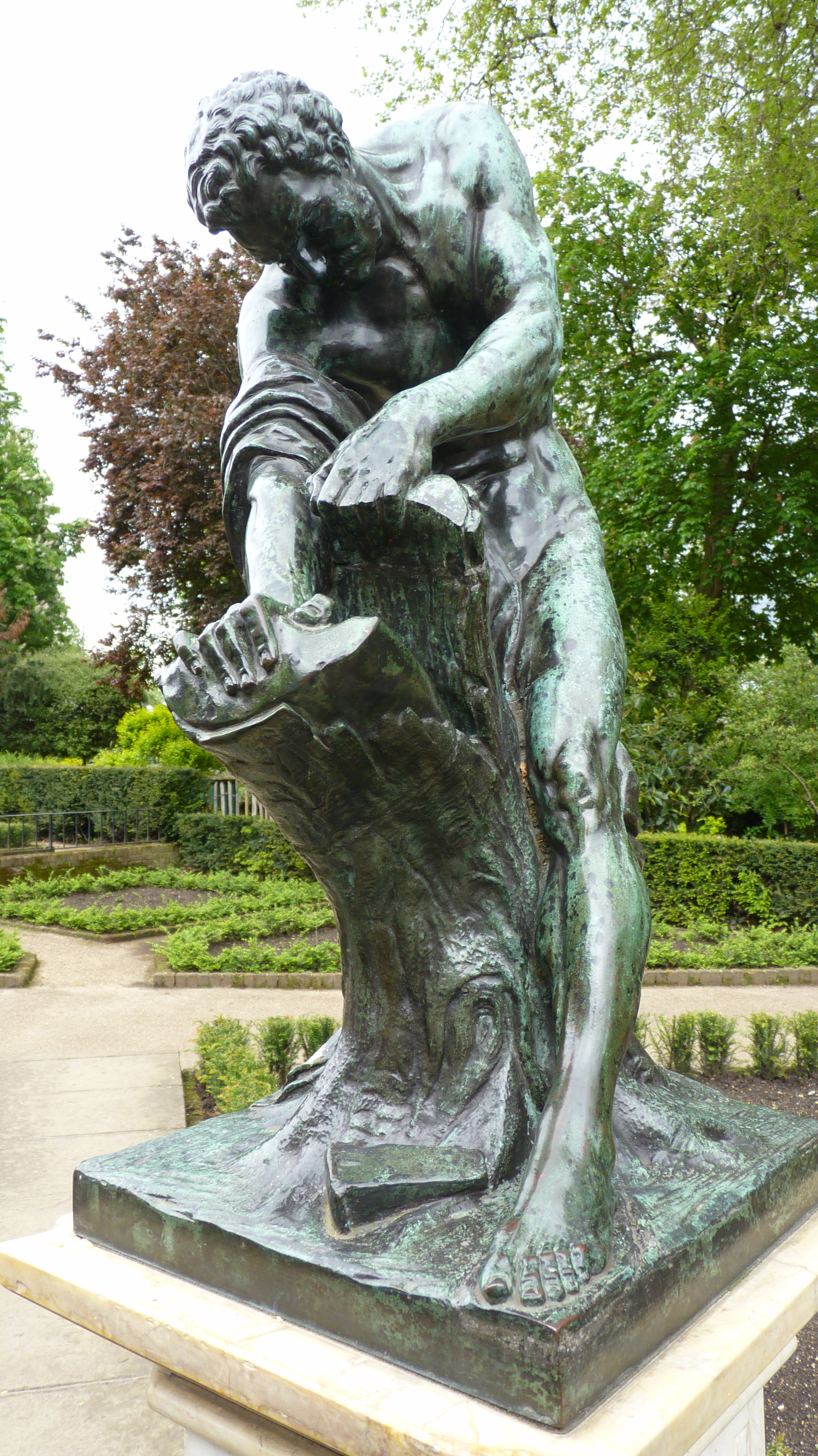
Statue of Milo in London's Holland Park, showing him opening two sides of a tree stump and about to get his hand stuck

Legend has it that Milo's penchant for showing off his strength was his eventual undoing. In 511 BC, he traveled the countryside and met a villager who was struggling to split a tree stump with a hammer and wedges. Milo excitedly asked the man if he could attempt to split the wood with his bare hands; the villager, honored by his offer, went off to get food while Milo worked. Milo immediately tried to pull the stump apart by inserting his fingers in the crack where the villager had driven the wedges, but as he pulled the stump open, the wedges fell out and trapped his fingers. Without the wedges to hold the crack open, Milo could not free his fingers from the stump, and instead opted to wait for the villager to return. The legend says that Milo, unable to defend himself, was then killed by wolves or a lion before the villager returned.

== Statue ==
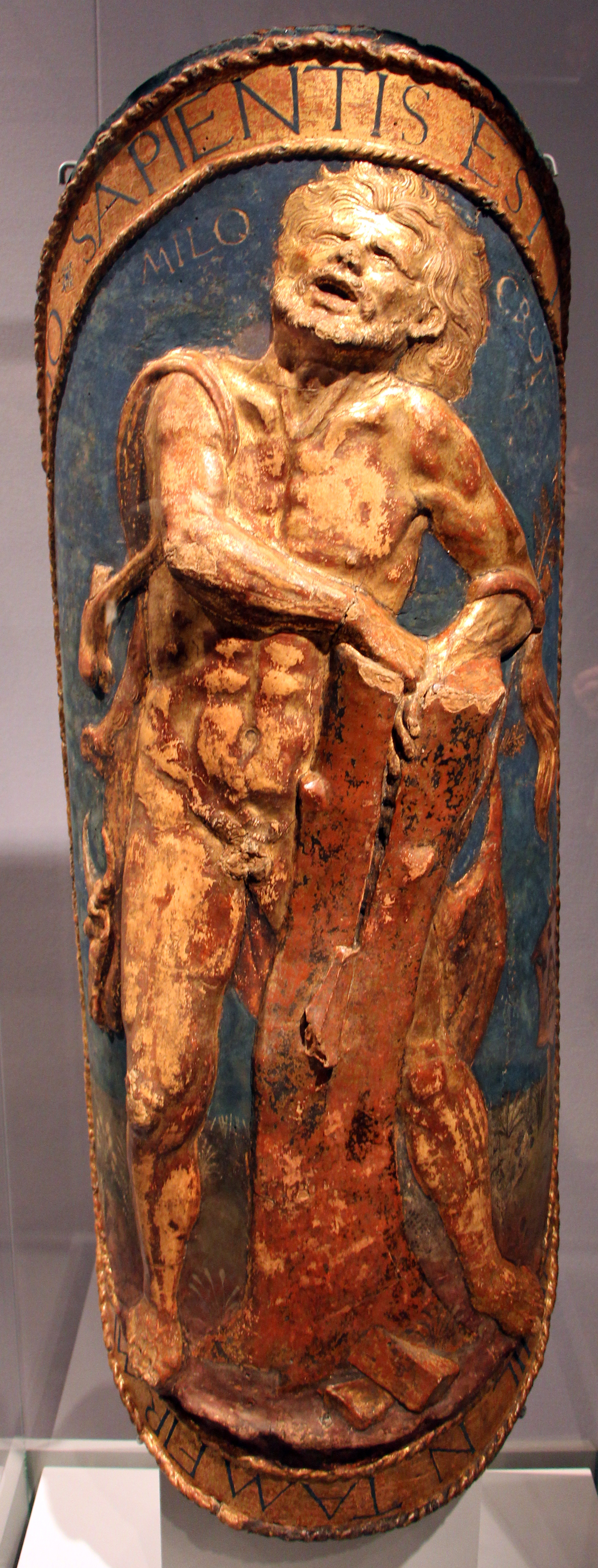
Parade shield by Antonio del Pollaiolo, 1460s, Louvre

The statue of Milo the son of Diotimus was made by Dameas, also a native of Crotona. Milo won six victories for wrestling at Olympia, one of them among the boys; at Pytho he won six among the men and one among the boys. He came to Olympia to wrestle for the seventh time, but did not succeed in mastering Timasitheus, a fellow-citizen who was also a young man, and who refused, moreover, to come to close quarters with him. It is further stated that Milo carried his own statue into the Altis. His feats with the pomegranate and the quoit are also remembered by tradition. He would grasp a pomegranate so firmly that nobody could wrest it from him by force, and yet he did not damage it by pressure. He would stand upon a greased quoit, and make fools of those who charged him and tried to push him from the quoit. He used to perform also the following exhibition feats. He would tie a cord round his forehead as though it were a ribbon or a crown. Holding his breath and filling with blood the veins on his head, he would break the cord by the strength of these veins. It is said that he would let down by his side his right arm from the shoulder to the elbow, and stretch out straight the arm below the elbow, turning the thumb upwards, while the other fingers lay in a row. In this position, then, the little finger was lowest, but nobody could bend it back by pressure. They say that he was killed by wild beasts. The story has it that he came across in the land of Crotona a tree-trunk that was drying up; wedges were inserted to keep the trunk apart. Milo in his pride thrust his hands into the trunk, the wedges slipped, and Milo was held fast by the trunk until the wolves—a beast that roves in vast packs in the land of Crotona—made him their prey. Such was the fate that overtook Milo.

— Milo in Pausanias' Description of Greece

== Bibliography ==
- Abdo, John (2020). Wolves of Croton: The Untold Story of Milo. Marina del Rey, CA: Ja Publishing, Inc. ISBN 978-1-7356-8471-0.
