= Coroebus of Elis =

Ancient Greek olympics victor in stadion

Personal information
- Born: Elis
- Years active: c. 776 BC

Sport
- Event: Stadion
Medal record
Ancient Greek Olympics
Representing Elis
Olympic Games
| Gold medal – first place | 776 BC Olympia | Stadion |

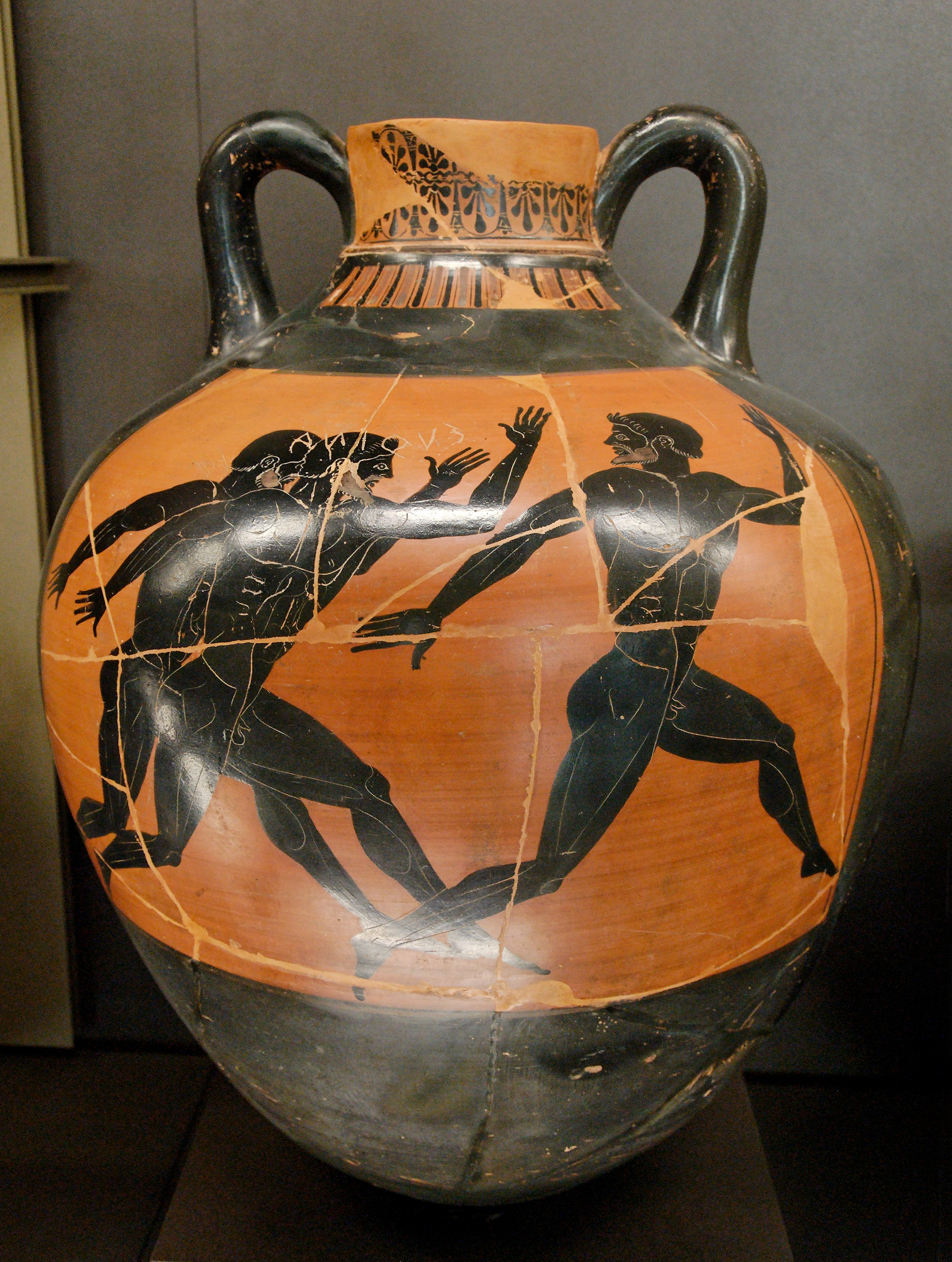
Runners (ca. 500 BC)

Coroebus of Elis (Ancient Greek: Κόροιβος Ἠλεῖος, Kóroibos Ēleîos; Latin: Coroebus Eleus fl. c. 776 BC) was a Greek cook, baker, and athlete from Elis. He is remembered as the winner (ολυμπιονίκες, olympioníkes) of the first recorded Olympics, which consisted of a single footrace known as the stade or stadion. He is frequently described as having won the first Olympic Games, but Eusebius and other ancient writers stated that he was simply the first recorded winner, variously placing the first games in the Heroic Age, 27 olympiads before Coroebus, or 13 olympiads before. Coroebus being the earliest winner known to Hippias, his is still reckoned the "1st Olympiad"; following Hippias's dating, his victory is generally placed in the summer of the year 776 bc. The stadium at Olympia was one stade (600 Greek feet, 630.8 English feet, 192.27 m) long and the competition was still clothed in his time, naked competition beginning with Orsippus around 720 bc. For winning the race, Coroebus received an olive wreath and was later revered by the people of Elis, his grave still being known in the time of Pausanias.

== See also ==
- Stadion race, unit, and stadium
- List of ancient Olympic victors
