= Oxythemis of Coroneia =

Ancient Greek athlete

Oxythemis of Cleonae or Coroneia was an ancient Greek athlete who won the stadion race in the 12th Ancient Olympic Games in 732 BC. The stadion race (about 180 meters) was the only competition in the first 13 Olympiads.

Eusebius relates that he was from Coroneia in Boeotia, and if he was right, this would make him the first winner from outside the Peloponnese. Flavius Philostratus however reports that he was from Cleonae, which appears more probable, and this would make him the first winner from Argolis.

== See also ==
- Olympic winners of the Stadion race
