= Astylos of Croton =

Ancient Greek Olympic athlete

Astylos of Croton or Astylus of Croton (Ἄστυλος/Ἀστύαλος ὁ Κροτωνιάτης) was an ancient Greek athlete who competed in three successive Olympic Games. In 488 and 484 BC he won the stadion and diaulos; in 480 BC he won the stadion, diaulos, and hoplitodromos. Astylos originally represented Croton, but later raced on behalf of Syracuse, (Note: The interpretation of Pausanias is ambiguous as to whether Astylos represented Croton or Syracuse in 484.) according to Pausanias to please Hiero, brother of the tyrant of Syracuse. David Young suggests that Astylos' change of allegiance was solely economically motivated, arguing that Hiero "simply bought Astylos' services".

After Astylos switched allegiance to Syracuse, the people of Croton took down a statue erected in his honour, and turned his house into a prison. Astylos' victory is the last known victory by an athlete from Croton in any of the four major Greek athletic competitions.

Nothing is known of Astylos' origin. H. W. Pleket claims that he was a nobleman, but there is no ancient evidence for this; David Young argues that it is unlikely that a nobleman would have chosen to represent Syracuse at the Olympics over his home city. He commissioned Simonides for an epinicion and Pythagoras of Samos for a statue in Olympia.

== See also ==
- List of Olympic winners of the Stadion race
