= Olympiad =

Period of four years associated with the Olympic Games of the Ancient Greeks

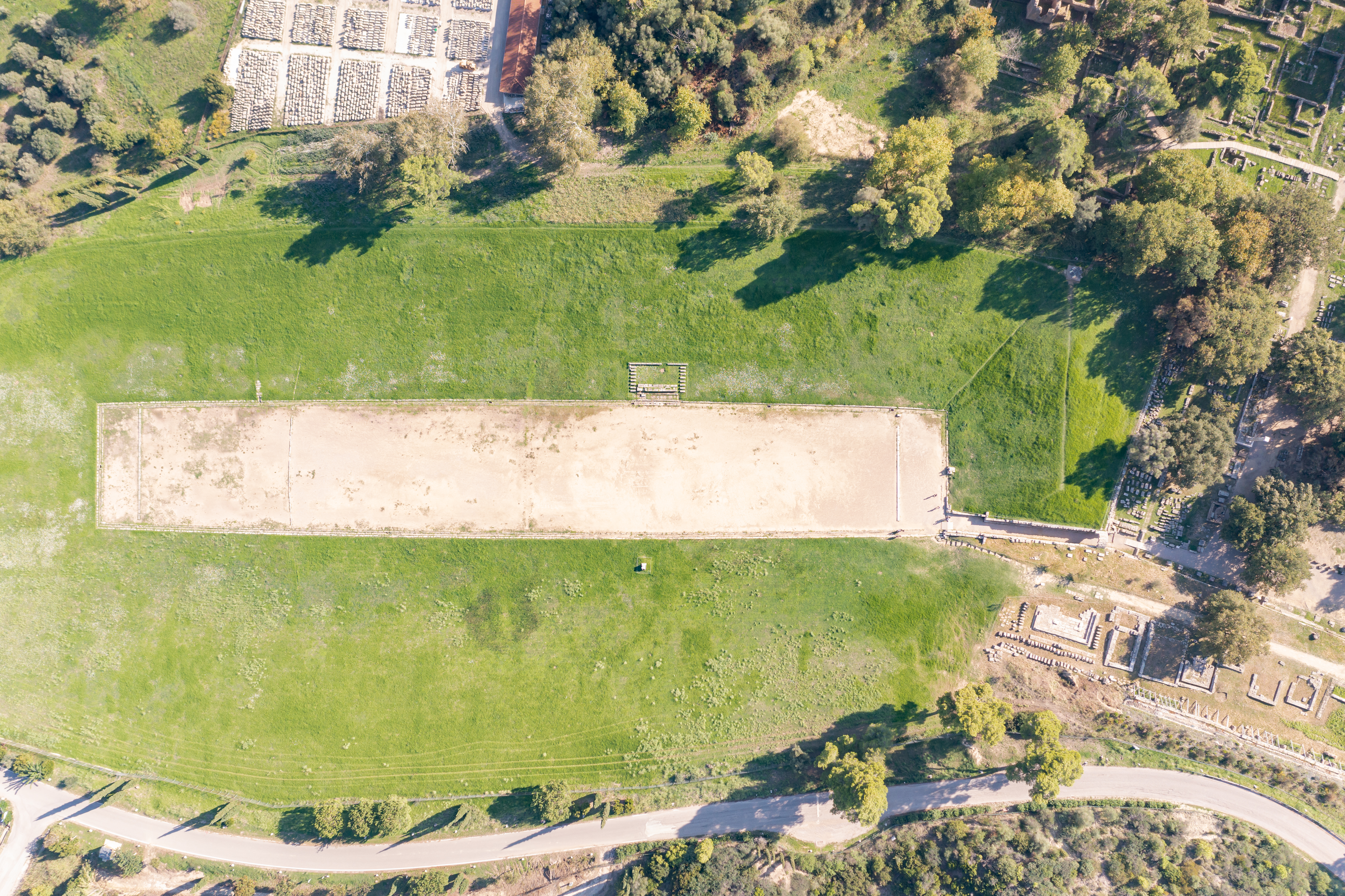
Stadium at ancient Olympia

An olympiad (Greek: Ὀλυμπιάς, Olympiás) is a period of four years, particularly those associated with the ancient and modern Olympic Games.

Although the ancient Olympics were established during Greece's Archaic Era, it was not until Hippias that a consistent list was established and not until Ephorus in the Hellenistic period that the first recorded Olympic contest was used as a calendar epoch. Ancient authors agreed that other Olympics had been held before the race won by Coroebus but disagreed on how many; the convention was established to place Coroebus's victory at a time equivalent to the summer of 776 BC in the Proleptic Julian calendar, and to treat it as Year 1 of Olympiad 1. Olympiad 2 began with the next games in the summer of 772 BC.

Thus, for N less than 195, Olympiad N is reckoned as having started in the year $780-(4\times N)$ BC and ended four years later. For N greater than or equal to 195, Olympiad N began in AD $(4\times N)-779$ and ended four years later. By extrapolation, the 2nd year of the 701st Olympiad begins roughly around 2 August 2026.

In reference to the modern Olympics, their Olympiads are four year periods beginning on 1 January of the year of the Summer Games. Thus, the I Olympiad began on 1 January 1896, the II Olympiad began 1 January 1900, and so on. The XXXIII Olympiad began 1 January 2024. Because the Julian and Gregorian calendars go directly from 1 BC to AD 1, the cycle of modern Olympiads is ahead of the ancient cycle by one year.

== Ancient Olympics ==
Each olympiad started with the holding of the games, which originally began on the first or second full moon after the summer solstice. After the introduction of the Metonic cycle about 432 BC, the start of the games was determined slightly differently. Within each olympiad, time was reckoned by referring to its 1st, 2nd, 3rd, or 4th year. Ancient writers sometimes describe their Olympiads as lasting five years but do so by counting inclusively; in fact each comprised a four year period. For example, the first year of Olympiad 140 began in the summer of 220 BC and lasted until the middle of 219 BC. After the 2nd, 3rd, and 4th years of Olympiad 140, the games in the summer of 216 BC would begin the first year of Olympiad 141.

=== Historians ===
The sophist Hippias was the first writer to compile a comprehensive list of the Olympic victors (ολυμπιονίκες, olympioníkes). Although his Olympic Record (Ὀλυμπιονικῶν Ἀναγραφή, Olympionikō̂n Anagraphḗ) is now entirely lost, it apparently formed the basis of all later Olympic dating. The numbering of Olympiads was introduced by Eratosthenes or Timaeus; the first on the list occurred in 776 BC. The panhellenic nature of the games, their regular schedule, and the improved victor list allowed Greek historians from Eratosthenes onwards to use the Olympiads as a way of reckoning time that did not depend on the various calendars of the city-states. The first to do so consistently was Timaeus of Tauromenium in the third century BC. Nevertheless, since for events of the early history of the games the reckoning was used in retrospect, some of the dates given by later historian for events before the 5th century BC are very unreliable. Because the Olympics occurred in mid-summer, the years reckoned by the Olympiad system aligned with the Attic calendar (which names years by the names of archons, not numbers) of Ancient Athens, but not with Roman consular years (which began on 1 January) or Ancient Macedonian calendar years (which began in the autumn).

In the 2nd century, Phlegon of Tralles summarized the events of each Olympiad in a book called Olympiads; fragments survive in the work of the Byzantine writer Photius. Christian chroniclers continued to use this Greek system of dating as a way of synchronizing biblical events with Greek and Roman history. In the 3rd century, Sextus Julius Africanus compiled a list of Olympic victors up to 217 BC, and this list has been preserved in the Chronicle of Eusebius.

=== Examples of Ancient Olympiad dates ===
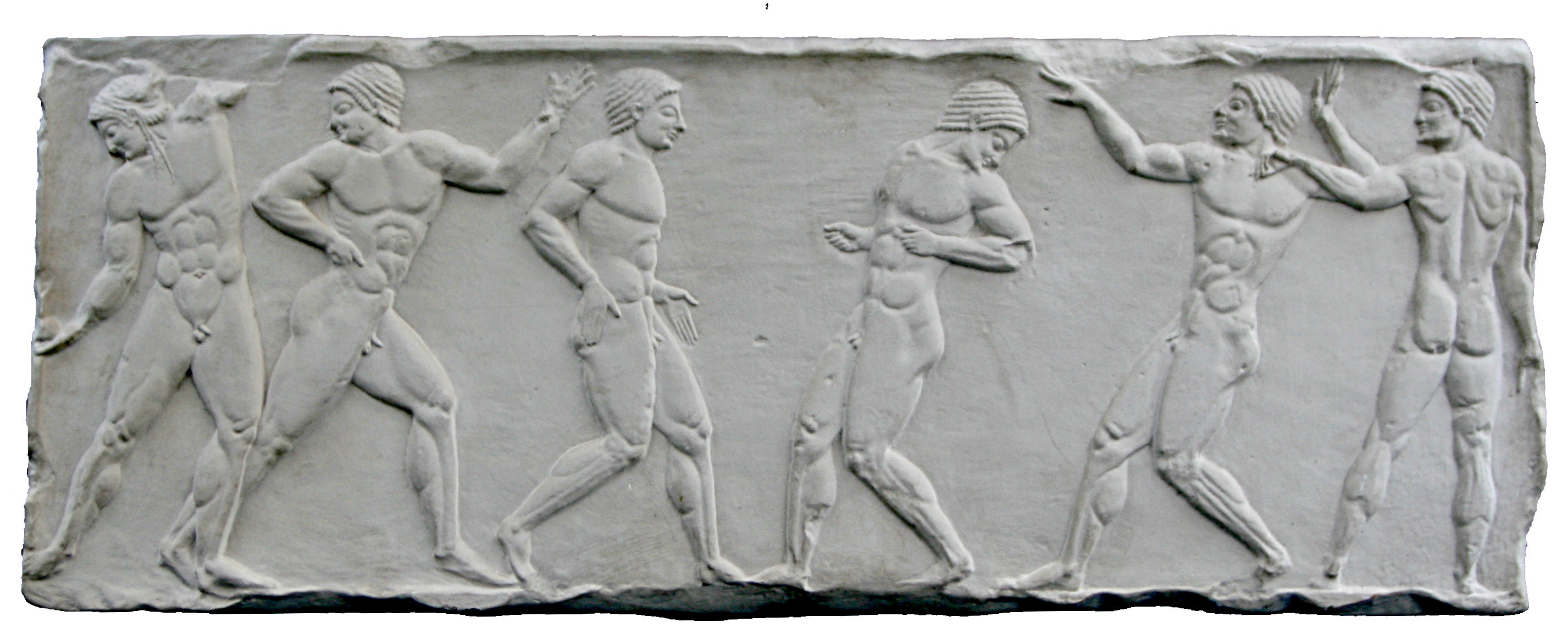
A relief of the Greek Olympiad

- Early historians sometimes used the names of Olympic victors as a method of dating events to a specific year. For instance, Thucydides says in his account of the year 428 BC: "It was the Olympiad in which the Rhodian Dorieus gained his second victory."
- Dionysius of Halicarnassus dates the foundation of Rome to the first year of the seventh Olympiad, 752 & 751 BC. Since Rome was founded on 21 April, which was in the last half of the ancient Olympic year, it would be 751 BC specifically. In Book 1 chapter 75 Dionysius states: "...Romulus, the first ruler of the city, began his reign in the first year of the seventh Olympiad, when Charops at Athens was in the first year of his ten-year term as archon."
- Diodorus Siculus dates the Persian invasion of Greece to 480 BC: "Calliades was archon in Athens, and the Romans made Spurius Cassius and Proculus Verginius Tricostus consuls, and the Eleians celebrated the Seventy-fifth Olympiad, that in which Astylus of Syracuse won the stadion. It was in this year that king Xerxes made his campaign against Greece."
- Jerome, in his Latin translation of the Chronicle of Eusebius, dates the birth of Jesus Christ to year 3 of Olympiad 194, the 42nd year of the reign of the emperor Augustus, which equates to the year 2 BC.

=== Anolympiad ===
Though the games were held without interruption, on more than one occasion they were held by others than the Eleians. The Eleians declared such games Anolympiads (non-Olympics), but it is assumed the winners were nevertheless recorded.

=== End of the era ===
During the 3rd century, records of the games are so scanty that historians are not certain whether after 261 they were still held every four years. Some winners were recorded though, until the 293rd Olympiad of AD 393.

Although the end of the games has sometimes been linked to the anti-pagan laws of Theodosius I (391–392) or Theodosius II (435), this is no longer widely accepted. The last games at Olympia were probably held in the first half of the 5th century. The last datable Olympic festival took place at Antioch in 520. Dating by Olympiads survived the Olympics themselves. The Chronicon Paschale dates events by Olympiad down to the 352nd Olympiad (AD 628).

== Modern Olympics ==
Olympiad	First year	Last year	Host city	Country
I (1st)	1896	1899	Athens	Greece
II (2nd)	1900	1903	Paris	France
III (3rd)	1904	1907	St. Louis	United States
IV (4th)	1908	1911	London	(United Kingdom) Great Britain
V (5th)	1912	1915	Stockholm	Sweden
VI (6th) (Note: Not celebrated because of World War I)	1916	1919	~~Berlin~~	~~Germany~~
VII (7th)	1920	1923	Antwerp	Belgium
VIII (8th)	1924	1927	Paris	France
IX (9th)	1928	1931	Amsterdam	Netherlands
X (10th)	1932	1935	Los Angeles	United States
XI (11th)	1936	1939	Berlin	Germany
XII (12th) (Note: Not celebrated because of World War II)	1940	1943	~~Tokyo~~	~~Japan~~
XII (12th)	1940	1943	~~Helsinki~~	~~Finland~~
XIII (13th)	1944	1947	~~London~~	~~(United Kingdom) Great Britain~~
XIV (14th)	1948	1951	London	(United Kingdom) Great Britain
XV (15th)	1952	1955	Helsinki	Finland
XVI (16th)	1956	1959	Melbourne	Australia
XVII (17th)	1960	1963	Rome	Italy
XVIII (18th)	1964	1967	Tokyo	Japan
XIX (19th)	1968	1971	Mexico City	Mexico
XX (20th)	1972	1975	Munich	West Germany
XXI (21st)	1976	1979	Montreal	Canada
XXII (22nd)	1980	1983	Moscow	Soviet Union
XXIII (23rd)	1984	1987	Los Angeles	United States
XXIV (24th)	1988	1991	Seoul	South Korea
XXV (25th)	1992	1995	Barcelona	Spain
XXVI (26th)	1996	1999	Atlanta	United States
XXVII (27th)	2000	2003	Sydney	Australia
XXVIII (28th)	2004	2007	Athens	Greece
XXIX (29th)	2008	2011	Beijing	China
XXX (30th)	2012	2015	London	(United Kingdom) Great Britain
XXXI (31st)	2016	2019	Rio de Janeiro	Brazil
XXXII (32nd) (Note: Celebrated in 2021 as the COVID-19 pandemic postponed the Olympics by one year.)	2020	2023	Tokyo	Japan
XXXIII (33rd)	2024	2027	Paris	France
XXXIV (34th)	2028	2031	Los Angeles	United States
XXXV (35th)	2032	2035	Brisbane	Australia

=== Start and end ===
The Summer Olympics are more correctly referred to as the Games of the Olympiad. The first poster to announce the games using this term was the one for the 1932 Summer Olympics, in Los Angeles, using the phrase: Call to the games of the Xth Olympiad.

The modern Olympiad is a period of four years: the first Olympiad started on 1 January 1896, and an Olympiad starts on 1 January of the years evenly divisible by four.

This means that the count of the Olympiads continues, even if Olympic Games are cancelled: For instance, the regular intervals would have meant (summer) Olympic Games should have occurred in 1940 and 1944, but both were cancelled due to World War II.

Nonetheless, the count of the Olympiads continued: The 1936 Games were those of the XI Olympiad, while the next Summer Games were those of 1948, which were the Games of the XIV Olympiad. The current Olympiad is the XXXIII of the modern era, which began on 1 January 2024.

Note, however, that the official numbering of the Winter Olympics does not count Olympiads, it counts only the Games themselves.

For example, the first Winter Games, in 1924, are not designated as Winter Games of the VII Olympiad, but as the I Winter Olympic Games. (The first Winter Games were termed as "Olympic" in a later year.)

The 1936 Summer Games were the Games of the XI Olympiad. After the 1940 and 1944 Summer Games were canceled due to World War II, the Games resumed in 1948 as the Games of the XIV Olympiad. However, the 1936 Winter Games were the IV Winter Olympic Games, and on the resumption of the Winter Games in 1948, the event was designated the V Winter Olympic Games.

The 2020 Summer Games were the Games of the XXXII Olympiad. On 24 March 2020, due to the COVID-19 pandemic, it was postponed to 2021 rather than cancelled, and thus becoming the first postponement in the 124-year history of the Olympics.

Some media people have from time to time referred to a particular (e.g., the nth) Winter Olympics as "the Games of the nth Winter Olympiad", perhaps believing it to be the correct formal name for the Winter Games by analogy with that of the Summer Games. Indeed, at least one IOC-published article has applied this nomenclature as well. This analogy is sometimes extended further by media references to "Summer Olympiads".

However, the IOC does not seem to make an official distinction between Olympiads for the summer and winter games, and such usage, particularly for the Winter Olympics, is inconsistent with the numbering discussed above.

=== Quadrennium ===
Some Olympic Committees often use the term quadrennium, which they claim refers to the same four-year period. However, it indicates these quadrennia in calendar years, starting with the first year after the Summer Olympics and ending with the year the next Olympics are held. This would suggest a more precise period of four years, but, for example, the 2001–2004 Quadrennium would then not be exactly the same period as the XXVII Olympiad, which was 2000–2003.

=== Cultural programmes ===
Pierre de Coubertin, who founded the modern Olympic Games, proposed including the arts in the Olympics, returning to the ancient tradition in Olympia, where both cultural events and physical feats were celebrated. At a 1906 conference in Paris, a project was launched to establish five arts competitions as part of the Olympic Games: in architecture, sculpture, painting, literature, and music, the Olympic art competitions. The first official programme was presented during the 1912 Games in Stockholm, with the last held in 1948.

In 1952 the Organising Committee of the Olympic Games (OCOG) of the Helsinki games decided to drop the arts programme. However From 1954 to 1990, the IOC asked each OCOG to organise a programme of arts events that showcased the best of the host country's culture as well as encouraging international understanding. From the Barcelona Olympics in 1992, a "Cultural Olympiad" started being held to accompany the Olympic Games, organised by the OCOG during the preceding four years to each Games as well as a series of major events to coincide with the sports events. The term "Cultural Olympiad" has been largely replaced by "Cultural Programme", which starts about four years before the Games. Around two months before the Games, the "Culture Festival" is launched, lasting until the end of the Paralympic Games. In 2020, a new strategy was announced as part of Olympic Agenda 2020, via Recommendation 26, which aims to "further strengthen the alliance of sport and culture at the Olympic Games and between their different editions". The Olympic Foundation for Culture and Heritage reinforced its own cultural policy as part of this new strategy.

== Other uses ==
The English term is still often used popularly to indicate the games themselves, a usage that is uncommon in ancient Greek (as an Olympiad is most often the time period between and including sets of games). It is also used to indicate international competitions other than physical sports. This includes international science olympiads, such as the International Geography Olympiad, International Mathematical Olympiad, International Forensics Olympiad, and the International Linguistics Olympiad and their associated national qualifying tests (e.g., the United States of America Mathematical Olympiad, the USA Forensics Olympiad or the United Kingdom Linguistics Olympiad), and also events in mind-sports, such as the Science Olympiad, Mindsport Olympiad, Chess Olympiad, International History Olympiad and Computer Olympiad. In these cases Olympiad is used to indicate a regular event of international competition for top achieving participants; it does not necessarily indicate a four-year period.

In some languages, like Czech and Slovak, Olympiad (Czech: olympiáda) is the correct term for the games.

The Olympiad (L'Olimpiade) is also the name of some 60 operas set in Ancient Greece.

== Notes ==
General

Specific
