= Stadion (running race) =

Ancient Greek running race

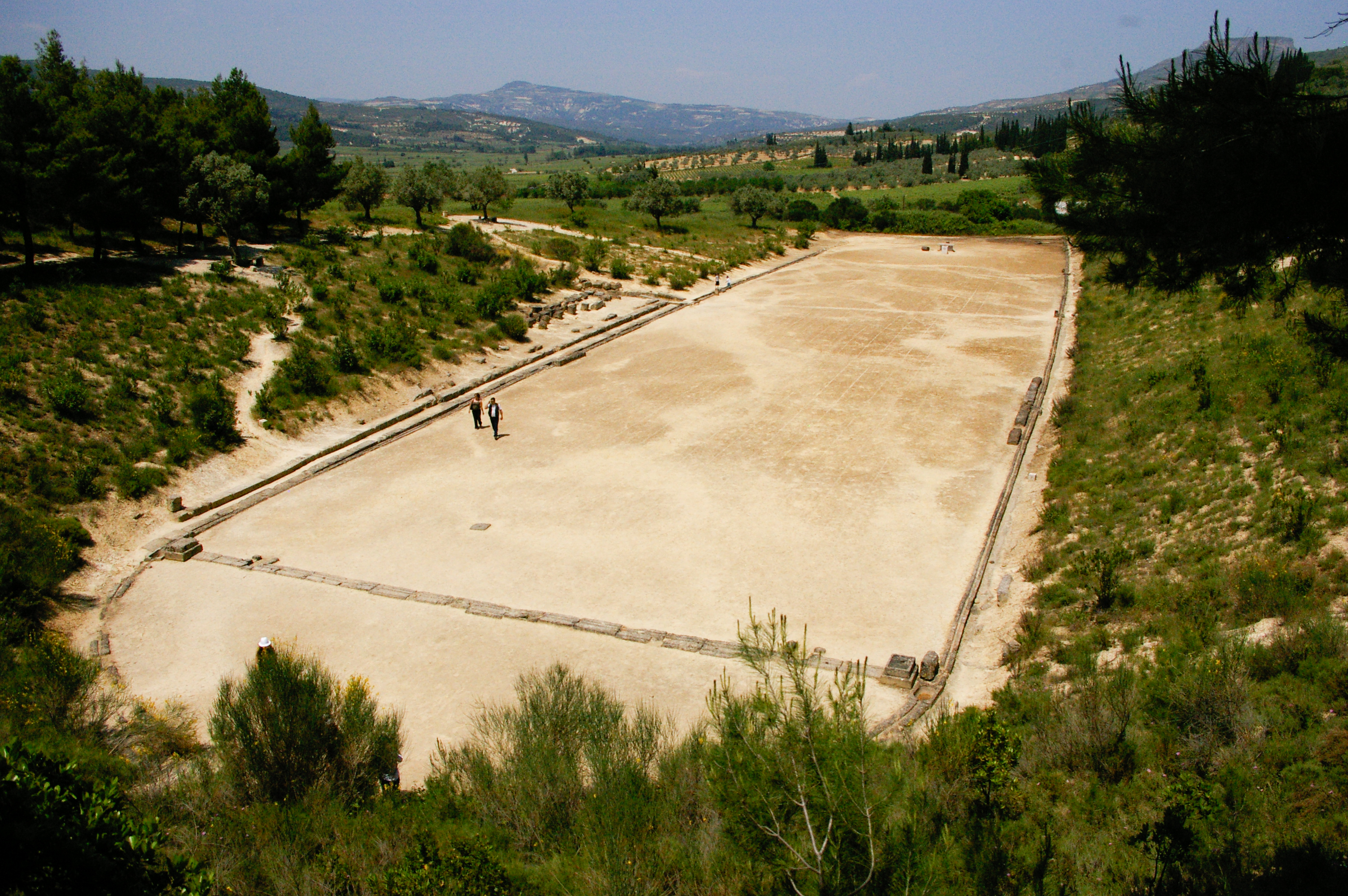
The stadion of ancient Nemea, Greece.

Stadion or stade (Ancient Greek: στάδιον) was an ancient running event and also the facility in which it took place, as part of Panhellenic Games including the Ancient Olympic Games. The event was one of the five major Pentathlon events and the premier event of the gymnikos agon (γυμνικὸς ἀγών "nude competition").

From the years 776 to 724 BC, the stadion was the only event at the Olympic Games. The victor (the first of whom was Coroebus of Elis) gave his name to the entire four-year Olympiad, allowing modern knowledge of nearly all of them.

The stadion was named after the facility in which it took place. This word became stadium in Latin, which became the English "stadium". The race also gave its name to the unit of length, the stadion. There were other types of running events, but the stadion was the most prestigious; the winner was often considered to be the winner of an entire Games. Though a separate event, the stadion was also part of the ancient Pentathlon.

At the Olympic Games, the stadion (facility) was big enough for 20 competitors, and the race was a sprint about 200 yards (180 m) long. (Note: The exact length of a stadion (unit) is unknown today; historians estimate it at between 150 m (490 ft) and 210 m (690 ft).) The race began with a trumpet blow, with officials (the ἀγωνοθέται agonothetai) at the start to make sure there were no false starts. There were also officials at the end to decide on a winner and to make sure no one had cheated. If the officials decided there was a tie, the race would be re-run. Runners started the race from a standing position, probably with their arms stretched out in front of them, instead of starting in a crouch like modern runners. They ran naked on a packed earth track. By the fifth century, the track was marked by a stone-starting line, the balbis. Advancements in this stone starting block led to it having a set of double grooves (10–12 cm (3.9–4.7 in) apart) in which the runner placed his toes. The design of these grooves were intended to give the runner leverage for his start.

== See also ==
- Running in Ancient Greece
- Olympic winners of the Stadion race
