= List of people associated with the University of Tübingen =

The University of Tübingen has a long list of notable alumni and staff. As of 2021, eleven Nobel Laureates, 16 Leibniz Laureates and four Alexander von Humboldt Professorships are affiliated with the university.

The following list also includes alumni of the Tübinger Stift, which is not a part of the university, but has a close relationship with it.

== Archaeology ==
- Marija Gimbutas (1921–1994), archaeologist
- Manfred Korfmann (1942–2005), archaeologist, director of excavations in Troy
- Aurel Stein (1862–1943), archaeologist (PhD 1883)

== Economics ==
- Helmut Haussmann, German minister of economy (1988–1991)
- Horst Köhler, director of the IMF (2000–2004) and President of Germany (2004–2010)
- Jürgen Stark, Chief Economist and Member of the executive committee of the European Central Bank
- Klaus Töpfer, United Nations Under-Secretary-General and Executive-Director of the United Nations Environment Programme

== Egyptology ==
- Boyo Ockinga, Egyptologist

== History ==
- Ernst Boepple (1887–1950), German Nazi official and SS officer executed for war crimes
- Andrzej Ciechanowiecki (1924–2015), Polish economist, and collector
- Kurt Georg Kiesinger, Chancellor of Germany (1966–1969)
- Hans Mommsen (1930–2015), historian
- Stephan Jakob Neher (1828–1902), Church historian
- Rita Süssmuth (1988–1998), president of the Bundestag, the German federal parliament
- Uwe Wolf (born 1961), musicologist

== Indology and Hinduism ==
- Heinrich von Stietencron, Indologist

== Law ==
- Gerhard Anschütz, father of the constitution of the Bundesland Hesse
- Martin Bangemann, German minister of economy (1984–1988) and EU commissioner (1989–1999)
- Fritz Bauer, German Jewish judge and chief prosecutor of Hesse (1956–1968)
- Julien Chaisse (born 1976), professor of law at the City University of Hong Kong
- Herta Däubler-Gmelin, German minister of justice (1998–2002)
- Wolfgang Ernst, legal historian and professor at the University of Oxford
- Roman Herzog, President of Germany (1994–1999)
- Klaus Hopt, German legal scholar
- Christine Hohmann-Dennhardt, politician and judge of the Federal Constitutional Court of Germany (1999–2011)
- Philipp Jenninger, President of the German federal parliament (1984–1988)
- Klaus Kinkel, vice-chancellor and minister of foreign affairs of Germany (1993–1998)
- Dieter Medicus, German legal scholar
- Gebhard Müller, President of the Federal Constitutional Court of Germany (1959–1971)
- Günther Oettinger, European Commissioner for Budget and Human Resources, Vice President of the Barroso II commission (2010–)
- Carlo Schmid, German politician and one of the "fathers of the constitution"
- Konstantin von Neurath, Minister of foreign affairs of Germany (1932–1938)
- Christoph Martin Wieland, (1733–1813), poet
- Jürgen Wöhler (b. 1950), German lawyer and manager

== Medicine, natural sciences, mathematics ==
- Yousef Al-Abed (b. 1964), chemist
- S. M. Razaullah Ansari (b. 1932), historian of science
- Alois Alzheimer, psychiatrist and neuropathologist
- Katrin Böhning-Gaese, biologist and ornithologist
- Simon Brendle (b. 1981), mathematician
- Victor von Bruns, surgeon
- Rudolf Jakob Camerarius (1665–1721), botanist, physicist
- Theodor Eimer (1843–1898), zoologist and comparative anatomist
- Leonhart Fuchs (1501–1566), botanist, physicist
- Hans Geiger (1882–1945), physicist
- Carl Haeberlin (1870–1954), physician
- Ingmar Hoerr (b. 1968), biologist
- Felix Hoppe-Seyler, chemist and physiologist
- Friedrich von Huene (1875–1969), paleontologist
- Johannes Kepler (1571–1630), astronomer
- Karl Meissner (1891–1959), physicist
- Julius Lothar Meyer (1830–1895), chemist
- Hugo von Mohl (1805–1872), botanist
- Friedrich Miescher, biologist
- George Nagobads (1921–2023), Latvian-born American physician
- Christiane Nüsslein-Volhard (b. 1942), biologist
- Hans Schlossberger (1887–1960), immunologist and microbiologist
- Wilhelm Schickard (1592–1635), astronomer
- Bernhard Schölkopf (b. 1968), computer scientist
- Johann Georg Gmelin (1709–1755), botanist
- Bei Shizhang (1903–2009), biologist
- Karl von Vierordt, physiologist (1818–1884)
- Detlef Weigel (b. 1961), biologist

== Philology ==
- Rabbi David Zvi Hoffmann, Rabbi
- Johann Reuchlin, humanist and philosopher
- Friedrich Hölderlin, poet
- Georg Wilhelm Friedrich Hegel, philosopher
- Alberto Jori, philosopher
- Heinrich Christoph Wilhelm Sigwart, philosopher
- Christoph von Sigwart, philosopher
- Friedrich Wilhelm Joseph Schelling, philosopher
- Ernst Bloch, philosopher
- Burghart Schmidt, philosopher
- Otfried Höffe, philosopher
- Julian Nida-Rümelin, philosopher
- Ernst Tugendhat, philosopher
- Manfred Frank, philosopher

== Psychology ==
- Paul Enck, psychologist specializing in psychosomatic medicine
- Wolfgang Köhler, psychologist
- Robert Zajonc (1923–2008), psychologist

== Sociology ==
- Ralf Dahrendorf, sociologist, economist, political scientist and politician

== Theology ==
- Karl Barth, Swiss, Reformed, 20th century Protestant theologian
- Ferdinand Christian Baur, Protestant theologian and historian of early Christianity and the New Testament
- Dietrich Bonhoeffer, Lutheran, 20th century Protestant theologian, opponent of the Nazi Regime
- Rudolf Bultmann, 20th century Protestant theologian known for existential biblical interpretation
- Gerhard Ebeling, Protestant theologian, former student of Rudolf Bultmann, specialist in philosophical hermeneutics
- Johannes Eck (1486–1543), Catholic theologian, counter-Reformer
- David F. Ford, Regius Professor of Divinity at the University of Cambridge (since 1991)
- Romano Guardini, Roman Catholic priest, author and academic
- Walter Kasper, Cardinal in the Roman Catholic Church, very Roman Catholic theologian of today
- Hans Küng, Roman Catholic theologian, critic of Catholic doctrine
- Philip Melanchthon (1497–1560), Protestant reformer, first systematic theologian of the Protestant Reformation
- Eduard Mörike, Protestant theologian, German poet
- Jürgen Moltmann, Protestant theologian
- Konrad Raiser, Protestant theologian, former General Secretary of the World Council of Churches (WCC)
- Charles-Frédéric Reinhard (1761–1837), Württembergian-born French diplomat, essayist, and politician
- Friedrich Wilhelm Joseph Schelling, Protestant theologian, philosopher
- Adolf Schlatter, Protestant theologian
- David Strauss, Protestant theologian and writer who revolutionized the study of the New Testament
- Paul Tillich, German-American theologian at Harvard University, Protestant theologian
- Miroslav Volf, Christian theologian at Yale University
- Karl Heinrich Weizsäcker, Protestant theologian and chancellor of the University of Tübingen
- Christoph Wölfflin (1625–1688), Protestant theologian, court preacher, and provost of Stuttgart
