= Henriette Harich-Schwarzbauer =

Professor of Classical Philology

- Born: 1955 (age 70–71)

Academic background
- Education: University of Graz

Academic work
- Discipline: Classical philology
- Institutions: University of Basel
- Notable works: Hypatia. Die spätantiken Quellen. Eingeleitet, kommentiert und interpretiert

Henriette Harich-Schwarzbauer (born 1955) is a professor and head of the department of Latin philology at the University of Basel, Switzerland.

== Life ==
Henriette Harich-Schwarzbauer was born in 1955 in Mürzzuschlag, Austria. She studied Classical Philology and Romance at the universities of Graz and Paris.

== Career ==
Harich-Schwarzbauer studied and completed her habilitation at the University of Graz on the sources for Hypatia, and this work was published as Hypatia. Die spätantiken Quellen. Eingeleitet, kommentiert und interpretiert in 2011. Harich-Schwarzbauer was assistant professor at the University of Graz, and then moved to the University of Basel where she was Dean of Humanities from 2010 to 2012. Harich-Schwarzbauer is now Professor of Latin Philology.

Working with Christian Guerra and Judith Hindermann, Harich-Schwarzbauer has published the first complete edition of the works of the Reformation period Basel poet and humanist Johannes Atrocianus, whose polemical works attacked the Reformation in Switzerland.

From 2019-2021, Harich-Schwarzbauer is directing the Swiss National Science Foundation funded Muse - Musse - Musseraum project, which examines how the writers Ausonius, Sidonius Apollinaris, and Enea Silvio Piccolomini take breaks in and re-formulate their literary work.

Harich-Schwarzbauer was President of the Collegium Beatus Rhenanus (CBR) 2014-16, a Classical and Ancient Studies research and teaching network with members from French, German and Swiss universities. She is an editorial board member for the Journal Museum Helveticum: schweizerische Zeitschrift für klassische Altertumswissenschaft = Revue suisse pour l'étude de l'antiquité classique = Rivista svizzera di filologia classica, a Swiss journal founded in 1944 that publishes articles covering all areas of Ancient Studies.

== Honours and awards ==
Harich-Schwarzbauer was made the Erwin Schrödinger Habilitation fellow of the Austrian Fund for Scientific Research at the Eberhard Karls University of Tübingen, 1993-94. From 1997-2002, she was a visiting professor at the University of Graz, and in March 2007 she was visiting professor at the University of the Sorbonne.

== Works ==
- Alexander epicus. Studien zur Alexandreis Walters von Châtillon. Graz 1987 (Dissertation).
- Gender-Studies in den Altertumswissenschaften. Räume und Geschlechter in der Antike. (Conference proceedings) Edited jointly with T. Spaeth. Trier 2005. .ISBN 9783884767894
- Von Atheismus bis Zensur: römische Lektüren in kulturwissenschaftlicher Absicht, Hildegard Cancik-Lindemaier, edited by H. Harich-Schwarzbauer and Barbara von Reibnitz, Würzburg: Koenigshausen & Neumann, 2006.
- Lateinische Poesie der Spätantike. Internationale Tagung in Castelen bei Augst, 11.–13. Oktober 2007. Edited by H. Harich-Schwarzbauer and Petra Schierl. Conférence proceedings. Basel: Schwabe, 2009.
- Hypatia. Die spätantiken Quellen. Eingeleitet, kommentiert und interpretiert. Bern: Lang, 2011 (Habilitationsschrift). According to WorldCat, the book is in 395 libraries
- Der Fall Roms und seine Wiederauferstehungen in Antike und Mittelalter. Edited with Karla Pollmann. Berlin/Boston 2013.
- Carmen perpetuum. Ovids Metamorphosen in der Weltliteratur. With Alexander Honold. (Editors) Basel 2013.
- Weben und Gewebe in der Antike: Materialität, Repräsentation, Episteme, Metapoetik. (Editor) Oxford: Oxbow Books, 2016.
- Johannes Atrocianus - Text, Übersetzung, Kommentar. C. Guerra, H. Harich-Schwarzbauer, and Judith Hindermann Hildesheim: Georg Olms Verlag, 2018.
