= Willemien =

Willemien is a feminine given name of Dutch origin.

== People with the given name ==
- Willemien Aardenburg (born 1966), former Dutch field hockey player
- Willemien Koning-Hoeve (born 1965), Dutch politician
- Willemien Otten (born 1959), Dutch and American medievalist and theologian
- Willemien "Minki" van der Westhuizen (born 1984) is a South African model and television presenter

== See also ==
- Willeman
