= Willemien Otten =

Dutch and American medievalist and professor (born 1959)

- Born: 1959 (age 66–67); Weesp, Netherlands
- Citizenship: Dutch and American
- Occupations: Medievalist and theologian
- Awards: Honorary doctorate, University of Copenhagen (2019); Named chair, University of Chicago Divinity School (2021)

Academic background
- Education: University of Amsterdam (PhD 1989)

Academic work
- Institutions: Boston College; Utrecht University (1997–2007); University of Chicago (2007–)

Willemien Otten (born 1959) is a Dutch and American medievalist and theologian, particularly known for her work on John Scotus Eriugena. She is professor of the history of Christianity and theology at the University of Chicago Divinity School. She holds the Dorothy Grant Maclear named chair and was a longtime president of the Society for the Promotion of Eriugena Studies (2011–2022).

== Early life and education ==
Willemien Otten was born in 1959 in Weesp, Netherlands. She completed her PhD at the University of Amsterdam in 1989 under Prof. M. B. Pranger and Prof. L. M. de Rijk.

== Career ==
Otten was first professor at Boston College, and then she taught ten years at Utrecht University. Since 2007, she has been a professor at the University of Chicago Divinity School, where she has served as director of the Martin Marty Center for the Public Understanding of Religion and has held the Dorothy Grant Maclear named chair since 2021.

She was president of the Society for the Promotion of Eriugenian Studies 2011–2022 and was a 2015–2016 Luce Fellow of the Association of Theological Schools in the United States and Canada and the Henry Luce Foundation. In 2019 she received an honorary doctorate from the University of Copenhagen.

She has served as a chief editor of The Journal of Religion.

== Thought ==
Otten specialized on John Scotus Eriugena on whom she wrote her dissertation published as The Anthropology of Eriugena. Through her books, articles or edited books, she provided solid scholarship on this Carolingian thinker. She worked on the concept of "nature," putting in discussion its early medieval conception with the contemporary understanding of "nature" – such as the one developed by Ralph Waldo Emerson.

Following Eriugena, she relates her conception of "nature" with the Holy Scripture, for instance on account of their manifoldness.

== Books ==
- The Anthropology of Johannes Scottus Eriugena. Brill, 1991.
- From Paradise to Paradigm: A Study of Twelfth-Century Humanism. Brill, 2004.
- with Karla Pollmann: Poetry and Exegesis in Premodern Latin Christianity: The Encounter between Classical and Christian Strategies of Interpretation. Brill, 2007.
- Thinking Nature and the Nature of Thinking: From Eirugena to Emerson. Stanford University Press, 2020.
