= Christoph von Sigwart =

German philosopher and logician (1830–1904)

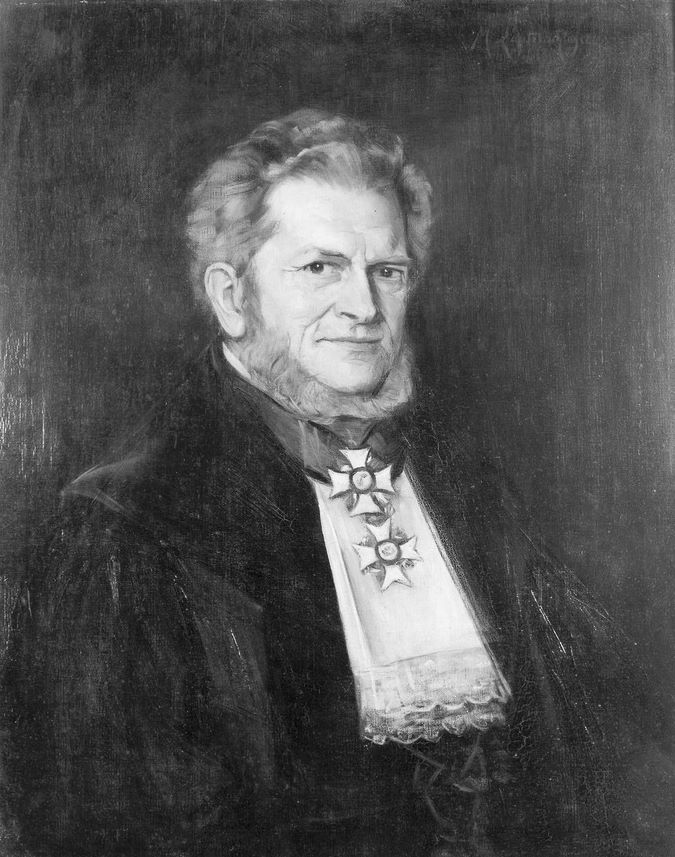
- Christoph von Sigwart
- Born: 28 March 1830; Tübingen, Kingdom of Württemberg
- Died: 4 August 1904 (aged 74); Tübingen, Kingdom of Württemberg
- Spouse: Lotte Georgii
- Children: 3, including Heinrich

Education
- Education: University of Tübingen

Philosophical work
- Era: 19th-century philosophy
- Region: Western philosophy
- School: Psychologism
- Institutions: University of Tübingen
- Doctoral students: Hans Vaihinger
- Main interests: Logic, ethics

Christoph von Sigwart (German: [ˈziːkvaʁt]; 28 March 1830 – 4 August 1904) was a German philosopher and logician. He was the son of philosopher Heinrich Christoph Wilhelm Sigwart (31 August 1789 – 16 November 1844).

== Life ==
After studies in philosophy and theology at Tübingen, Sigwart became professor at the Blaubeuren (in 1859) and at Tübingen (in 1865).

== Philosophical work ==
The first volume of Sigwart's principal work, Logik, was published in 1873 and took an important place among contributions to logical theory in the late nineteenth century. In the preface to the first edition, Sigwart explains that he makes no attempt to appreciate the logical theories of his predecessors; he intended to construct a theory of logic, complete in itself.

The Logik represents the results of a long and careful study not only of German but also of English logicians. In 1895 an English translation by Helen Dendy was published in London. Chapter 5 of the second volume is especially interesting to English thinkers as it contains a profound examination of the induction theories of Francis Bacon, John Stuart Mill and David Hume. His Kleine Schriften contains valuable criticisms on Paracelsus and Giordano Bruno.

== Quotations ==
No amount of failure in the attempt to subject the world of sensible experience to a thorough-going system of conceptions, and to bring all happenings back to cases of immutably valid law, is able to shake our faith in the rightness of our principles. We hold fast to our demand that even the greatest apparent confusion must sooner or later solve itself in transparent formulas.

== Publications ==
- Ulrich Zwingli, der Charakter seiner Theologie (1855). Google (Oxford) Google (Stanford) Google (UCal)
- Spinoza's neuentdeckter Traktat von Gott, dem Menschen und dessen Glückseligkeit (1866). Google (Harvard) Google (Oxford)
- Beiträge zur Lehre vom hypothetischen Urteile (1871). Google (UMich)
- Logik (1873–1878). 2 volumes. 2nd ed., 1889-1893. 3rd ed., 1904. 4th ed., 1911. 5th ed., 1924.
  - Volume 1, 1873. Die Lehre vom Urtheil, vom Begriff und vom Schluss. 1889. Google (UCal) IA (UToronto) 1904. Google (Harvard)
  - Volume 2, 1878. Die Methodenlehre. IA (UToronto)
- Kleine Schriften (1881). 2 volumes. Google (UCal) 2nd ed., 1889.
- Vorfragen der Ethik (1886).
- Die Impersonalien, eine logische Untersuchung (1888). Google (UCal) Google (UMich)

=== English translations ===
- Logic (1895). (Tr. Helen Dendy)
  - Volume 1. The Judgment, Concept, and Inference. Google (Stanford) Google (UWisc) IA (UToronto)
  - Volume 2. Logical Methods. Google (Stanford) Google (UMich) Google (UWisc) IA (UToronto)

== See also ==
- Psychologism dispute
