= Thomas Iftner =

German virologist

Thomas Iftner (born 27 July 1958 in Fürth) is a German virologist. He heads the Institute for Medical Virology and Epidemiology of Viral Diseases at the University Hospital Tübingen.

His research interests in the field of papillomaviruses range from basic research and animal models to clinical studies and molecular epidemiology, with over 200 publications.

== Life and work ==
Thomas Iftner received his diploma in biology in 1985 and his doctorate from the University of Erlangen in 1988. His postgraduate training included a research fellowship at the University of California, Dept. of Microbiology and Immunology, Los Angeles, USA. From 1990 to 1997 he was at the University of Erlangen, where he habilitated in 1993. From 1997 to 2018, he was a full professor at the Eberhard Karls University of Tübingen and head of the Research Section for Experimental Virology. In April 2018, he took over as head of the Institute of Medical Virology. He founded the Molecular Medicine programs in 2006 at the University of Tübingen and was dean of studies for Molecular Medicine from 2006 to 2017. From 2009 to 2020, he was also Vice Dean in the Faculty of Medicine. Furthermore, he has been an associate professor at James Cook University, Townsville, Australia, since 2009.

After activities as co-founder and director of the European Consortium Against Cervical Cancer (ECCA, Lyon, France), Iftner has been chairman and initiator of the Zervita project group since 2006, whose aim is to inform the public in Germany about risk factors, prevention, early detection and treatment of cervical carcinoma and its precursors, as well as about human papillomaviruses. He belonged to expert groups of the International Agency for Research on Cancer (IARC) in Lyon, for the preparation of the monograph on cervical cancer prevention and papillomaviruses, in which the valid risk classification of HPV genotypes was established, and the "Cervical Cancer Screening Handbook" and was a member of the board of directors "International Papillomavirus Society" (IPVS).

The multinational cohort study by Iftner and Dillner was one of the seminal papers for the American guidelines on cervical cancer screening. He is a member of the American Society of Microbiology, the German Society of Virology and member of the COMSTECH distinguished scholar program of the OIC.
