= Pi-Chacán =

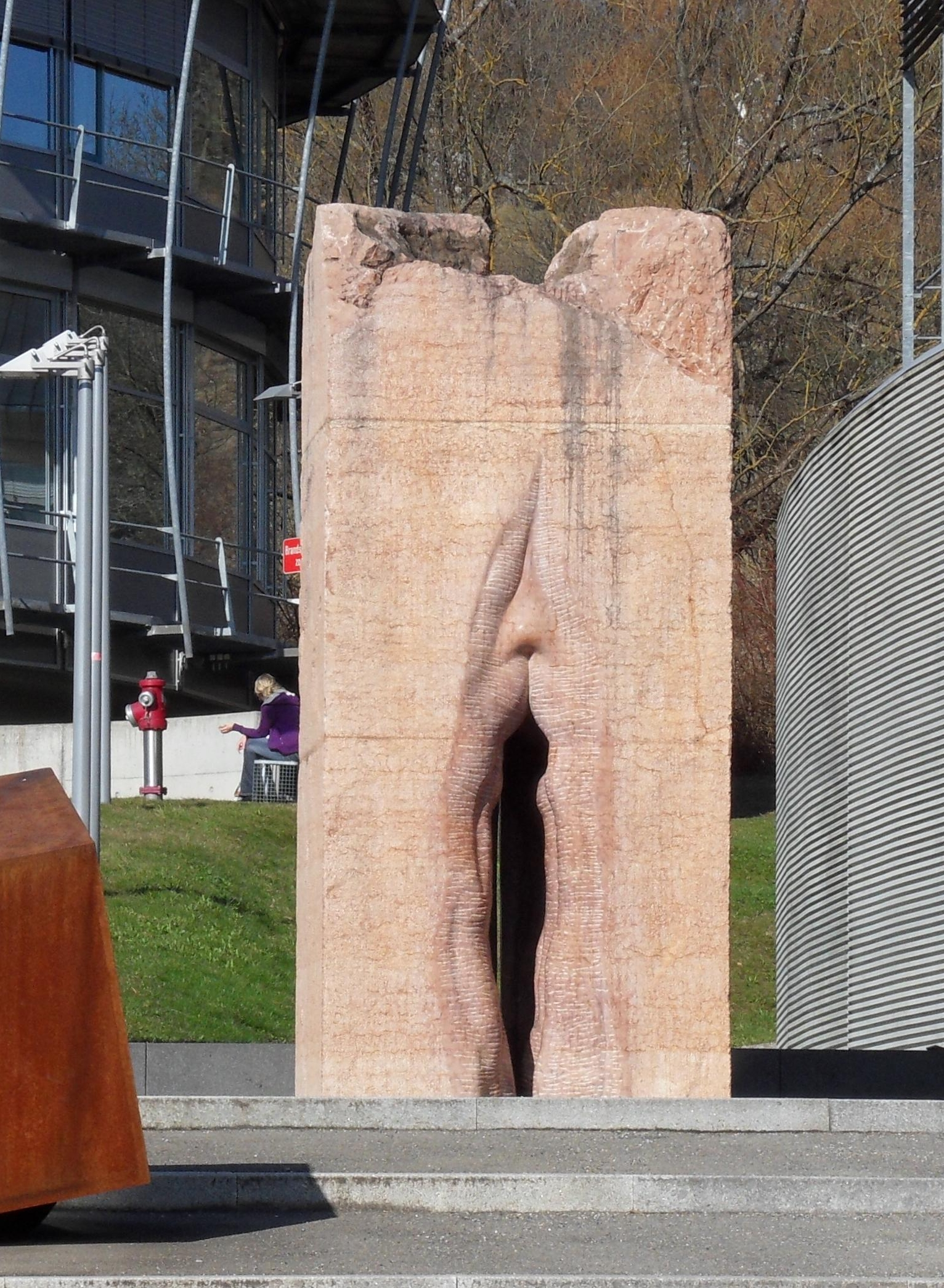
- Front view of Pi-Chacán

- Location within Germany
- Artist: Fernando de la Jara
- Year: 2001
- Medium: Red Verona marble
- Subject: vulva
- Dimensions: 4.2 m × 1.7 m × 1.7 m (14 ft × 5.6 ft × 5.6 ft)
- Weight: 32 tons
- Location: University of Tübingen; 48.531832°N 9.03443°E

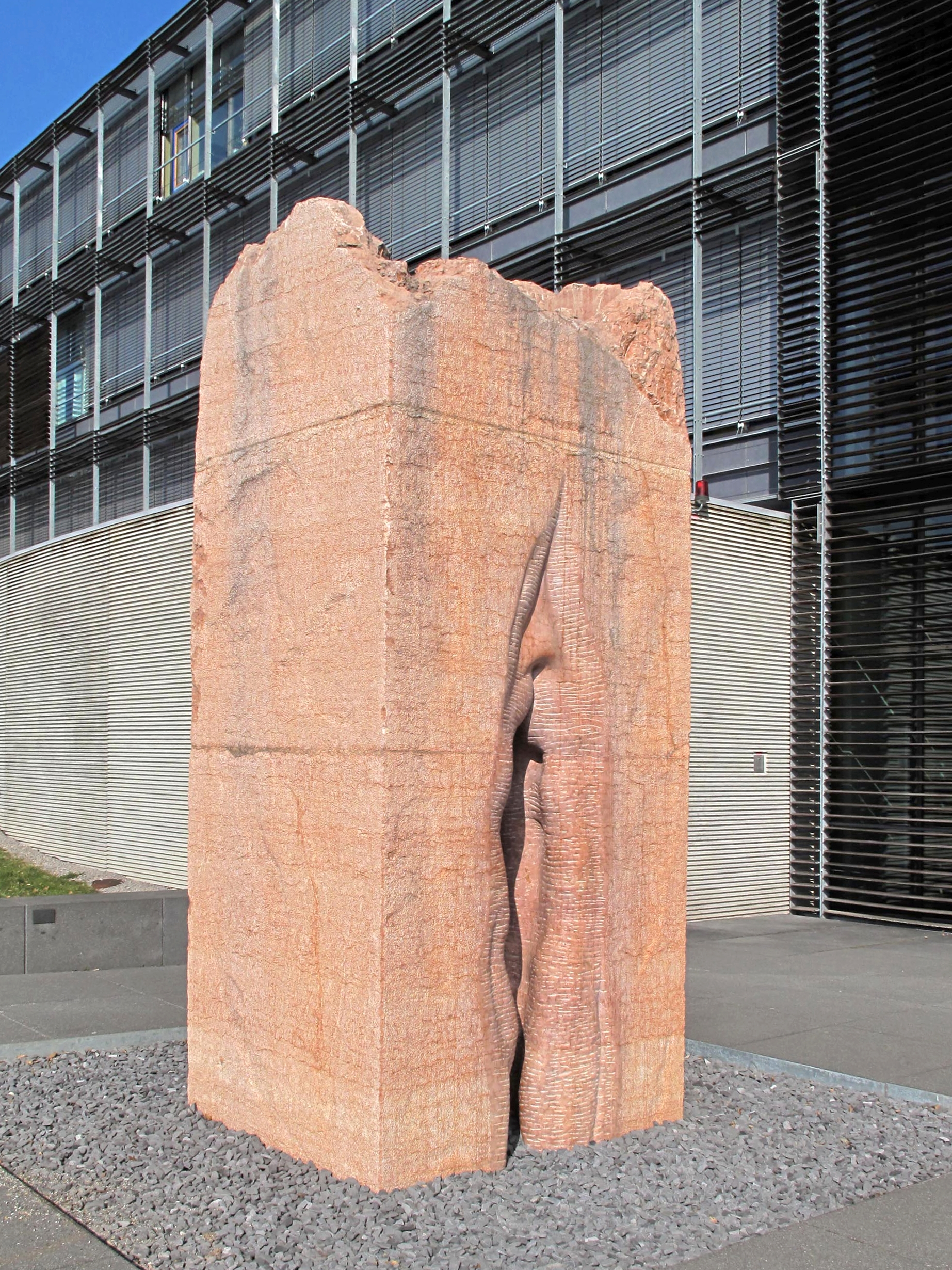
Side view of Pi-Chacán

Pi-Chacán (/ˈpiː tʃəˈkɑːn/; also known as Chacán-Pi) is a sculpture by the Peruvian artist Fernando de la Jara that has stood in the grounds of the University of Tübingen's Institute for Microbiology and Virology since 2001. Weighing 32 tons and measuring 4.2 × 1.7 × 1.7 metres (13.8 × 5.6 × 5.6 ft), the sculpture is made from red Verona marble and depicts a vulva. It cost €120,000 and was originally intended to have a pool of water at its base, but budgetary constraints prevented this element of the design from being constructed.

== Overview ==
The sculpture's name is from the native Peruvian Quechuan language. According to de la Jara, the word chacán means "place where the action of water has tunneled through a large rock or a mountain", or alternatively "lovemaking". Pi is both a Greek character and a mathematical symbol, π, that looks similar to a door or a vulva.

It is placed at the end of the Weg der Künste (Street of the Arts) facing the entrances of the university's Anatomy, Microbiology and Virology buildings. This location, in a place dedicated to the study and healing of the human body, inspired the artist to devise a way "to celebrate the body." De la Jara comments:

Hospitals are places where we are faced, like in a Shakespearean drama, with the big issues of men's lives brought to their most ardent limits. I thus asked myself: How to make a piece that is not an escape from this reality, but rather an extension, an enlargement of this same reality? The answer came on its own. In a place where the daily struggles and reconciliations are against Thanatos [death], I had to erect a monument to Eros [love/life].

De la Jara says that he intended the work to be tactile and able to be appreciated even by the blind, through the use of different textures and forms: "The principal part of the work isn't outside." He describes it as "participatory art" and suggests that "it should be entered."

== Incident ==
On 20 June 2014, the sculpture attracted widespread international media attention when an unnamed American exchange student got trapped inside it, reportedly after climbing into it as part of a dare. He was said to have "tried to pose for an unusual photo" but found that he could not climb out of it.

When the Tübingen police received an emergency call to tell them that "a person is trapped inside a stone vulva", 5 fire engines and 22 firefighters were sent to rescue the student from the sculpture. According to the local fire brigade, "We were able to pull the victim out with our bare hands after about 30 minutes ... a forceps delivery was not necessary."

Tübingen's mayor later told the media that he could not imagine how the incident had happened "even when considering the most extreme adolescent fantasies. To reward such a masterly achievement with the use of 22 firefighters almost pains my soul." A witness who took photographs of the student stuck in the sculpture and posted them on Imgur commented, "The fire department was not really amused, and he was really embarrassed." Neither the sculpture nor the student was harmed in the incident.

The sculpture's artist, Fernando de la Jara, told New York magazine that he was amused by the incident and attributed it to "a lack of coordination ... or maybe it was a lack of sensibility" on the part of the student. He commented that "instead of jumping in, if he had gone in carefully, he wouldn't have had a problem."
