= Tübingen Hoplitodromos Runner =

Statuette of an Ancient Greek athlete, made around 485 BC in Attica, Greece

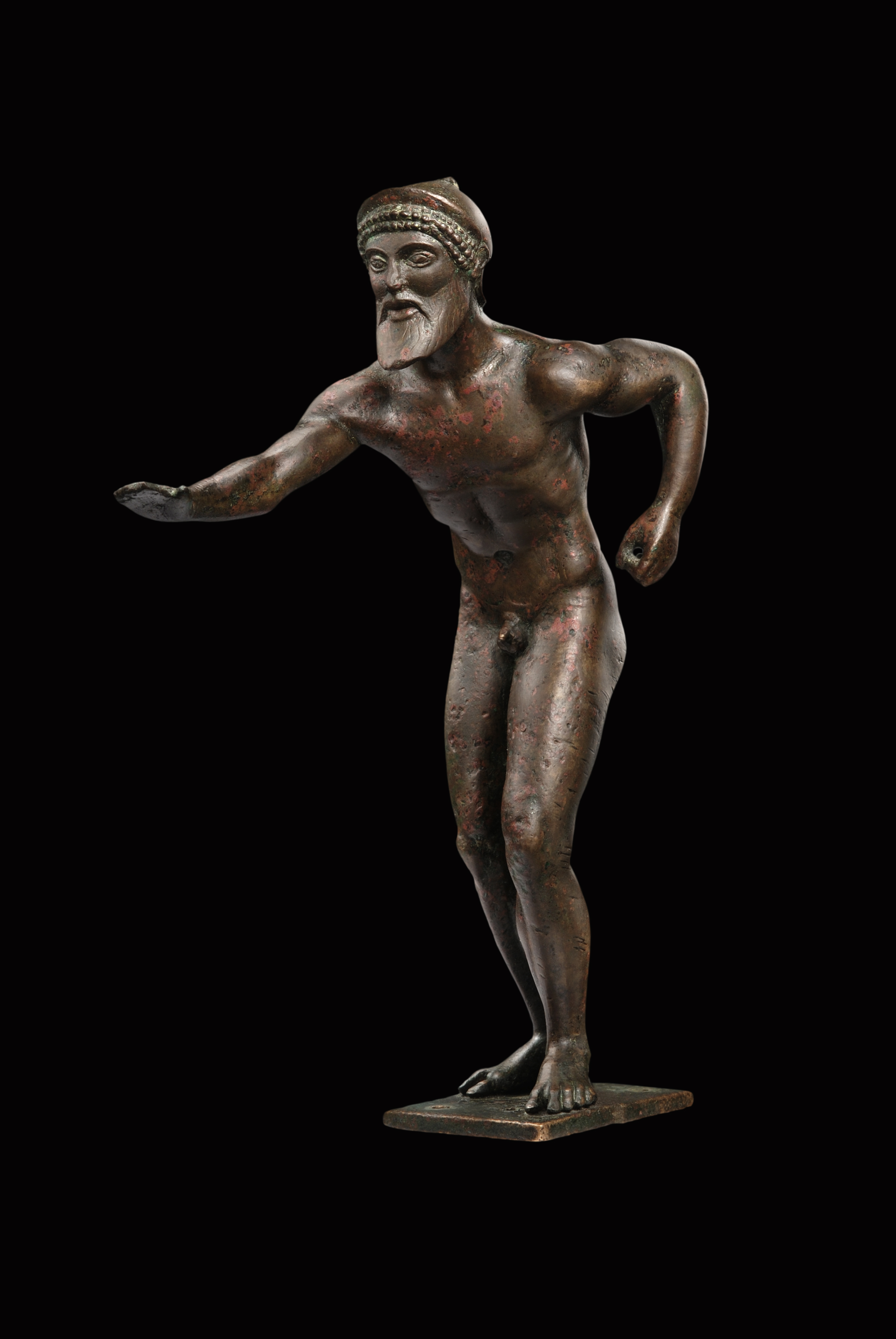
Tübingen Hoplitodromos Runner

The Tübingen Hoplitodromos Runner (German: Tübinger Waffenläufer, i.e. literally: "Tübingen weapons runner") is a statuette of an Ancient Greek athlete wearing a helmet, made in Attica around 485 BC. It is exhibited in the Museum Alte Kulturen (Ancient Cultures Museum) of the University of Tübingen. At the end of the 19th century, the characteristic posture of the athlete led Friedrich Hauser to interpret the statuette as an armed hoplitodromos runner in the starting position, an interpretation that is undisputed today.

== Description ==
The statuette is made from solid tin bronze and is 16.35 centimetres (6.44 in) tall. It represents a bearded naked man wearing a helmet, in a forward-leaning starting position typical for the Greeks, with the left leg slightly forward and the right arm stretched horizontally forward with an open hand. The hole in his left fist clearly indicates that he originally held an object, possibly the grip of a shield. Both feet are on the ground, as if the runner is waiting for the sign to start the race, with his face raised expectantly. His knees are bent and his inclined and well-muscled torso is tensed. The chest is turned towards his left arm, on which he probably wore a round shield. The statuette is missing its separately worked shield. The helmet crest is also mostly missing (a remnant is visible on the 3D model – link below), and originally ran from the front of the helmet down to the middle of the back. The figure is firmly connected to its flat bronze base plate by two round pins on the soles of the feet.

The hoplitodromos was used for physical training of heavily armed hoplites, specifically as a combat tactic to minimize the time of exposure to Persian arrows while charging forward. The united Greek army initiated the decisive defeat of the Persians at the Battle of Marathon (490 BC) by attacking at the run.

== History ==
A winner of a hoplitodromos competition might have commissioned the bronze figure around 485 BC and then donated it to the Acropolis of Athens. It may have been a votive offering in the sanctuary, where it was probably placed at a prominent location with an inscription, so that viewers would learn the name and victory of the athlete.

Carl Sigmund Tux (1715–1798), a government official, had inherited the statue from his father, and donated his collection to the University of Tübingen when he died without heirs on 29 January 1798. The statue initially had an inconspicuous presence in Tübingen, until its value was recognised in 1827 by the Munich court councilor Friedrich Thiersch. He noted the similarity of the statuette with the almost life-size marble pedimental sculptures of the Temple of Aphaea on Aegina, which had arrived at that time in Munich, supplemented and reconstructed by the sculptor Bertel Thorvaldsen in Rome. It became apparent that the statue originally was equipped with a shield.

The statuette was originally kept by the University Library of Tübingen, which moved to the castle in 1831. In 1833 it was given its own display with a glass hood in the northeast tower of the castle. It moved with the various locations of the classical antiquities collection in the Pfleghof and in Wilhelmstraße 9, finally making its way back to the castle in 1997/1998, to the same tower room it had left over one hundred years before.

As shown by X-ray examination, the statuette was manufactured as a solid lost-wax casting. Three samples were taken in 1886 from the attached base plate for material analysis by the Tübingen chemist Lothar Mayer. This revealed that the baseplate is composed of 88% copper, 11% tin and 0.4% iron. Only recently, modern techniques could also provide information about the material composition of the statuette itself. Investigations of the statuette's surface by means of spatially resolved μ-X-ray fluorescence and μ-X-ray diffractometry clearly show a slightly different alloy composition of the figure and the base plate and indicate that these probably had been assembled in modern times.
