= Fernando de la Jara =

Peruvian artist (born 1948)

Fernando de la Jara (born 1948 in Lima, Peru) is a Peruvian artist who has lived in Germany since 1987.

== Biography and works ==
At age 17, he was commissioned by Jesuits to paint a fresco in a church in Lima. In 1968, he worked under Spanish painter Manuel de Viola of the El Paso Group. In 1971 and 1972, he traveled to Europe to study; of particular interest to him were Flemish and Venetian painting. From 1973 to 1977, he lived in the Peruvian highlands with the goal of working for a time free from the constraints of the art market. In 1982, he won first prize at the Ancón Arts Festival (Festival de arte de Ancón) in Lima. From 1984 to 1986, he lived and worked in New York City. In 1987, he was offered a research assignment at the Catholic University of Eichstätt in Germany. Since then, he has lived and worked in Germany.

His works mainly consist of oil paintings, frescoes, sculptures, installations and projects, lithographs and drawings. They are held by private and public collections in Peru and abroad. His works have been shown in major galleries as well as in solo and group exhibitions. Significant public sculptures in Germany include:

- Minerva (1999), a 6-meter-tall granite sculpture in front of the Max Planck Haus am Hofgarten in Munich; and
- Pi-Chacán (2001), a 32-ton marble sculpture in front of the University Hospital in Tübingen
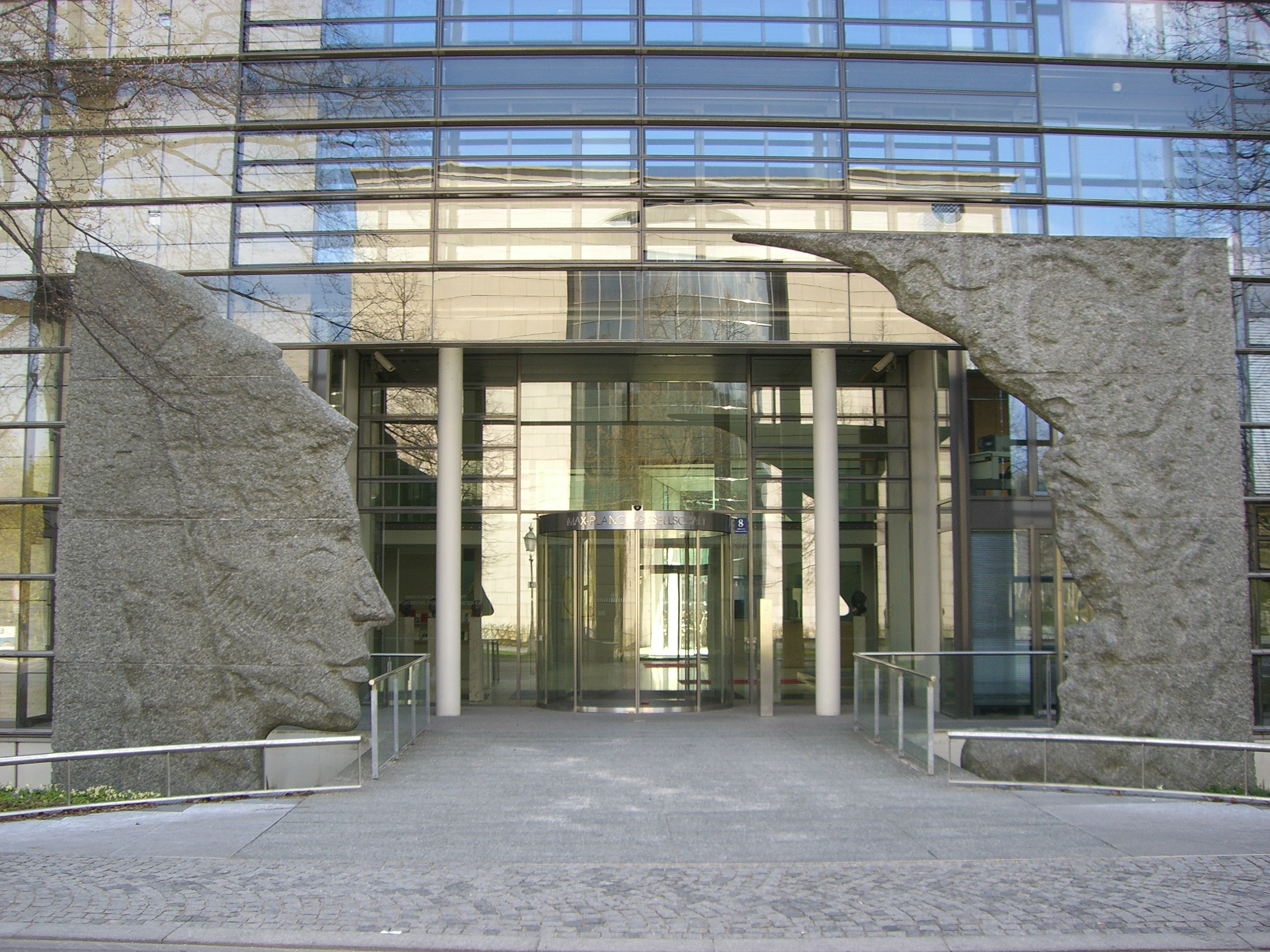
Minerva in Munich

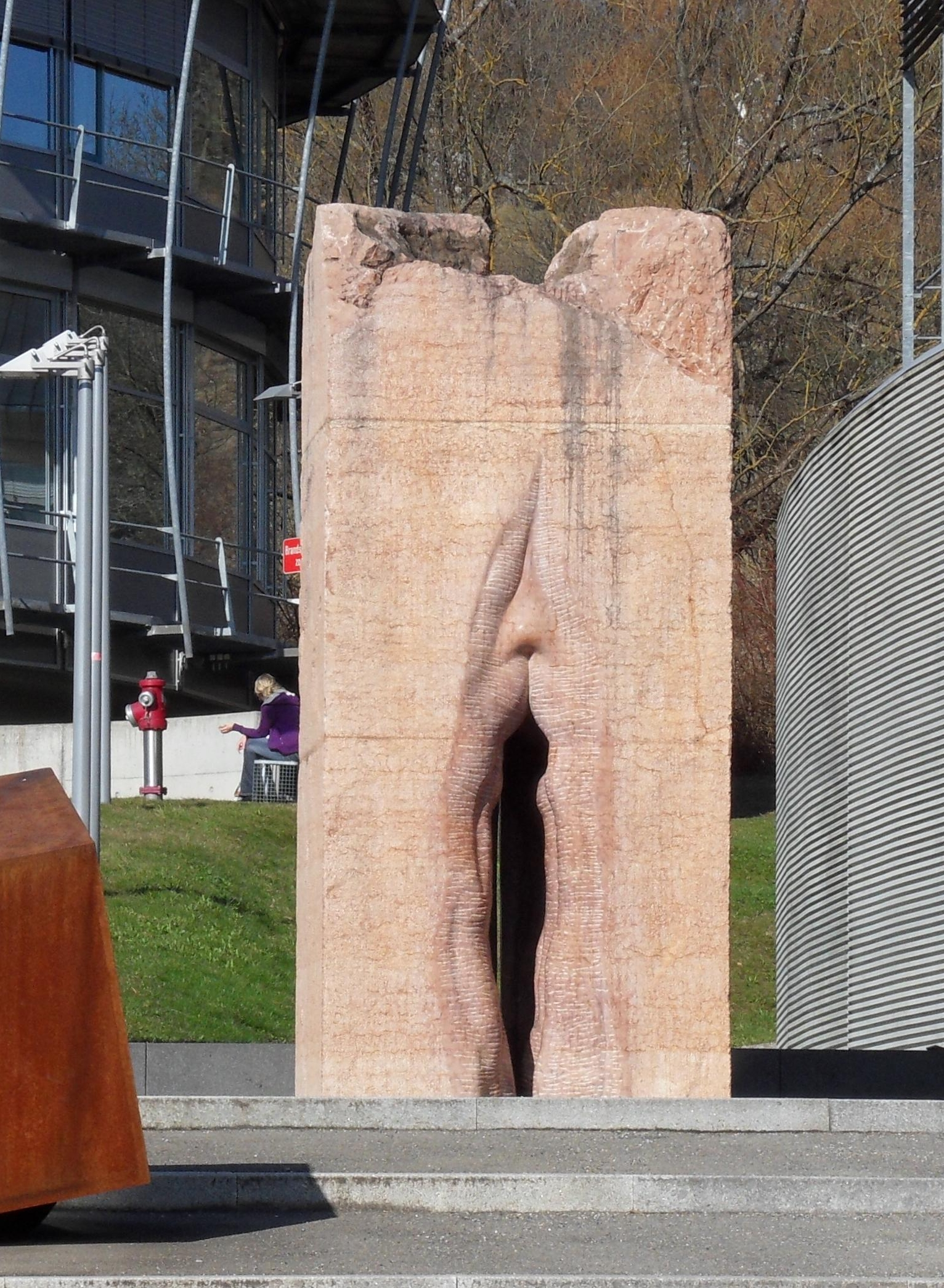
Pi-Chacán in Tübingen

== Bibliography ==
- Fernando de la Jara; Carlos Rodríguez Saavedra; Jorge Villacorta (2000). Fernando de la Jara: pinturas y dibujos (in Spanish). E. Lores. p. 116.
