= The Journal of Religion =

Academic journal

- Discipline: Religious studies
- Language: English
- Edited by: Sarah Hammerschlag, Willemien Otten, and Brook Ziporyn

Publication details
- Former names: The Hebrew Student; The Old Testament Student; The Old and New Testament Student; The Biblical World; The American Journal of Theology
- History: 1882 to present
- Publisher: University of Chicago Press for the University of Chicago Divinity School (United States)
- Frequency: Quarterly
- Impact factor: 0.5 (2024)

Standard abbreviations
- ISO 4: J. Relig.

Indexing
- ISSN: 0022-4189

Links
- Journal homepage

The Journal of Religion is an academic journal published by the University of Chicago Press. The journal "embraces all areas of theology (biblical, historical, ethical, and constructive) as well as other types of religious studies (literary, social, psychological, and philosophical)." It was first published in 1882 as The Hebrew Student, then The Old Testament Student in 1883, next The Old and New Testament Student in 1889, then The Biblical World in 1893, and The American Journal of Theology in 1897. Finally, it became The Journal of Religion in 1921.

It is published quarterly and is issued by the University of Chicago Divinity School. In March 2026 the chief editors were Sarah Hammerschlag, Willemien Otten, and Brook Ziporyn.

== See also ==
- List of theological journals
- University of Chicago
