= Efferenn's Trust =

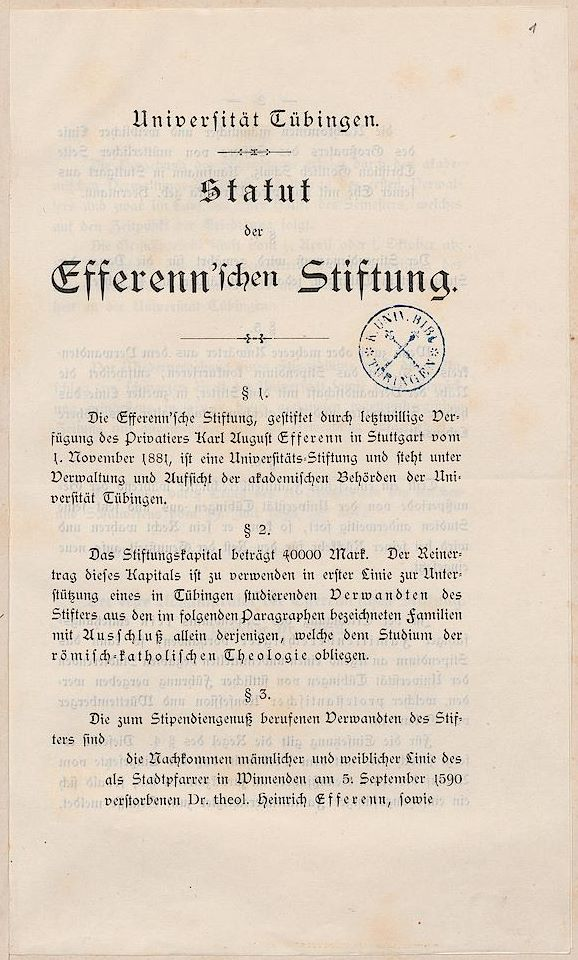
Statut der Efferenn'schen Stiftung

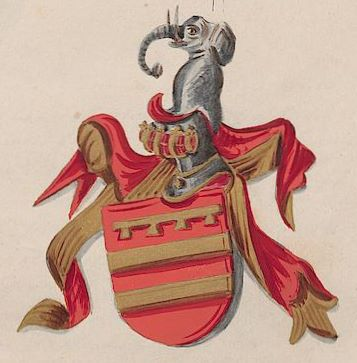
Wappen der Familie Efferenn

The Efferenn's Trust was founded in 1881 by the last will of the independent gentleman Carl August Efferenn. The starting capital was 40,000 Marks, i.e. today approximately €250,000. The trust was managed by the academic officers of University of Tübingen. It was primarily set up for supporting a relative of the donor, who studied in Tübingen. If no candidate of the family applied, the scholarship could be given to a poor but intelligent student of the university, if he was a protestant and from Württemberg.

Carl August Efferenn and K. von der Becke published 1878–1881 in Tübingen a mainly handwritten booklet with the family tree, data, drawings and excerpts to the genealogy of the Tübingen line of Efferrenn family, which is still kept by the university library. The booklet contains a printed copy of the statutes of the Efferenn's Trust.
