= Christoph Wölfflin =

German theologian (1625–1688)

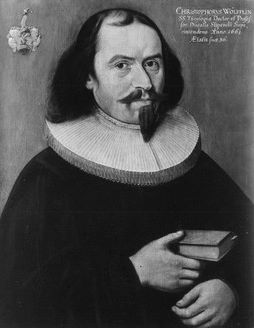
Portrait of Wölfflin in the collection of the University of Tübingen

Christoph Wölfflin (1625–1688) was a Lutheran theologian of Germany.

== Life ==
Christoph Wölfflin was born in Würtemberg, either at Owen, or at Kirchheim unter Teck, on 23 December 1625. He moved to Tübingen and studied at the university there, was in 1651 deacon at Aurach, in 1657 at Tübingen, in 1659 professor of Greek, and in 1660 was made doctor and professor of theology.

In 1669, Duke Eberhard III appointed him court preacher, and provost of Lorch. In 1680, Duke Frederic Charles appointed him provost of Stuttgart, a position which has never again been occupied after Wölfflin.

He died at Stuttgart on 30 October 1688.

== Works ==
- Exercitationes 8 de Lapsu Adami;
- Exercitt. 7 de Obligatione Credendi in Christum;
- Exercitt. 5 de Poenitentia Tyriorum et Sidoniorum;
- Dissert. de Triduo Mortis Christi;
- Historia Incestus Lothi.

Many of his works have been digitized and are freely available online.

== Sources ==
- Holtz, Sabine (1993). Theologie und Alltag: Lehre und Leben in den Predigten der Tübinger Theologen 1550–1750. Tübingen: J. C. B. Mohr (Paul Siebeck). pp. 437–439.

Attribution:

- Pick, B. (1887). "Wölfflin, Christoph". In McClintock, John; Strong, James (eds.). Cyclopædia of Biblical, Theological and Ecclesiastical Literature. Supplement.—Vol. 2. New York: Harper & Brothers. p. 963.
