= Lysus =

Lysus (Ancient Greek: Λῦσος) was a Macedonian sculptor, mentioned by Pausanias, as the creator of the statue of Criannius of Elis, an Olympic victor who won a victory in the race in armour. This statue stood in the Altis, a sanctuary at Olympia, the site of the Olympic Games.

== Online Reading ==
- Classical E-text : Pausanias
- Smith, Dictionary of Greek and Roman Biography and Mythology : Lysus
