= Heinrich Christoph Wilhelm Sigwart =

German philosopher and logician (1789–1844)

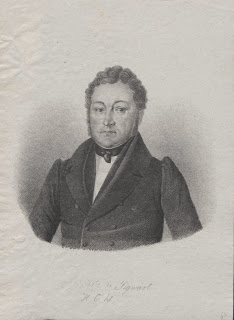
Heinrich Christoph Wilhelm von Sigwart

Heinrich Christoph Wilhelm von Sigwart (31 August 1789 – 16 November 1844) was a German philosopher and logician. He was the father of Christoph von Sigwart (28 March 1830 – 4 August 1904), who also was a philosopher and logician.

== Life ==
Sigwart was born into a family with a long history of philosophers, theologians and physicians at Remmingsheim in Württemberg. From 1813 he served as a repentant at Tübinger Stift in Tübingen, and obtained an associate professorship at the University of Tübingen in 1816. He became a full professor of philosophy at Tübingen in 1818 and wrote numerous books on the history of philosophy. He died in Stuttgart.

== Works ==
- Über den Zusammenhang des Spinozismus mit der Cartesianischen Philosophie (1816). Google (UMich)
- Handbuch zu Vorlesungen über die Logik (1818; 3rd edition, 1835). Google (UCal) Google (UMich)
- Handbuch der theoretischen Philosophie (1820).
- Die Leibnizsche Lehre von der prästabilierten Harmonie (1822). Google (Harvard) Google (UMich)
- Grundzüge der Anthropologie (1827).
- De historia logicae inter Graecos usque ad Socratem commentatio (1832).
- Der Spinozismus: historisch und philosophisch erläutert (1839). Google (Harvard) Google (UCal)
- Die Propädeutik der Geschichte der Philosophie (1840).
- Vergleichung der Rechts- und Staatstheorien des B. Spinoza und des Th. Hobbes (1842). Google (Harvard)
- Geschichte der Philosophie (3 volumes, 1844).
