= Jürgen Wöhler =

German lawyer and manager (born 1950)

Jürgen Otto Wöhler (born 10 May 1950, in Oberlahnstein) is a German lawyer and manager. He has served as Secretary General of the Korean-German Chamber of Commerce and Industry in Seoul from June, 2007, to May, 2012.

== Education ==
After the Abitur, Wöhler joined the German Army (since 1987 Major) and in 1977 successfully completed his studies in law, economics, history and politics at the University of Tübingen and the University of Geneva. After the first legal state examination in 1977, he went to Georgetown University, Washington D.C., as a research fellow. In 1978 he received a Master in Comparative Law from the University of Strasbourg. In 1980 he completed the second legal state examination in Stuttgart and received the admission to advocacy.

== Career ==
From 1981 to 1983 Wöhler was executive of the building legislation office as an official of the Interior Ministry of Baden-Württemberg. From 1983 to 1985 he worked as a permanent representative to the State Ministry of Baden-Württemberg in the Bundestag in Bonn. From 1985 to 1987 he was Deputy Managing Director of the Investment Consulting and Legal Department of the Korean-German Chamber of Commerce and Industry in Seoul. From 1987 to 2007 he was executive director responsible for foreign operations at the Landesbank Baden-Württemberg in Stuttgart and since April 2007 is Secretary General of the Korean-German Chamber of Commerce and Industry.

Furthermore, Wöhler is a registered arbitrator at the Korean Commercial Arbitration Board and Member of the Chartered Institute of Arbitrators (MCIArb) in London. Recent publications include a paper in the Hankuk University of Foreign Studies (HUFS) Global Law Review.

== Honors ==
- Federal Cross of Merit of the Federal Republic of Germany, 2009
- Sungrye Medal for "Diplomatic Service Merit" of the Republic of Korea, 2008
- Officier de l'Ordre national du Mérite of the French Republic, 2006
