= Karla Pollmann =

German classical scholar (born 1963)

- Born: Karla Friedel Lore Pollmann; October 21, 1963 (age 62); Tübingen, Germany
- Education: University of Tübingen; LMU Munich; University of Cambridge; Ruhr University Bochum (PhD 1990)
- Occupations: University dean and professor
- Employer(s): University of Vienna, the University of British Columbia (Green College); Wolfson College Oxford; Institute for Advanced Study, the Netherlands Institute for Advanced Study; University of Århus; Stellenbosch University; University of Bristol; Bielefeld University; University of Konstanz; University College London

Karla Friedel Lore Pollmann (born 21 October 1963) is the President of the University of Tübingen in Germany, an office she has held since 1 October 2022. Previously she was the Dean of Arts at the University of Bristol, where she worked in both the department of Classics and Ancient History and the department of Religion and Theology. Her research covers Classical to Late Antiquity, patristics, the history of exegesis and hermeneutics, and the thought of Augustine of Hippo and its reception.

== Early life and education ==
Pollmann was born Karla Friedel Lore Pollmann on 21 October 1963 in Tübingen, Germany.

She studied Classics, Divinity, and Education at the University of Tübingen, LMU Munich, the University of Cambridge, and the Ruhr University Bochum, receiving her PhD in Classics from the Ruhr University Bochum in 1990.

== Career ==
Pollmann began her career as an assistant professor first at Bielefeld University (1990–91), then at the University of Konstanz (1991–95), teaching Latin. She spent some time on postdoctoral studies at University College London, funded by an Alexander von Humboldt award (1993–95). In 1994, she finished her Habilitation at Konstanz, and she moved to the University of St Andrews to take up a post as a lecturer in Classics (1995–2000). In 2000, she was promoted to the rank of Professor.

Pollmann is a visiting professor at many institutions, including the University of Vienna, the University of British Columbia (Green College), Wolfson College Oxford, the Institute for Advanced Study in Princeton, New Jersey, the Netherlands Institute for Advanced Study, and the University of Århus, where she has been made an adjunct professor. She was elected professor extraordinary at Stellenbosch University for 2011–2013. In 2014 she founded the Centre for Early Christianity and its Reception at the University of Kent, and was Director of the school between 2014 and 2016. She was a professor of Classics and the head of the School of Humanities at the University of Reading. From 2018 onwards, Pollmann has been the Dean of Arts at the University of Bristol.

Pollmann is a college peer review member of the Arts and Humanities Research Council and has served on various of its panels. She is on the editorial or advisory board of several journals and encyclopedias, including Societies, Oxford Journal of Reception Studies, Millennium, Journal of Ancient Christianity, Lexikon der Bibelhermeneutik, Augustiniana, Hypomnemata, and Thoemmes Dictionary of British Classicists: 1500-1960, and is editor-in-chief of the international and interdisciplinary Oxford Guide to the Historical Reception of Augustine.

== Research expertise ==
Pollmann works on ancient texts of Antiquity ranging from Homer to the early Christian writers. She is particularly interested in the interface between Classics and Theology, especially the reception of Classical thought and literature in Christian writers and the amalgamation and transformation of ideas from Classical and Late Antiquity. More recently she has become interested in the reception of early Christian thought in later times, and this interest led to her directing an international and interdisciplinary project funded by the Leverhulme Trust on the reception of Augustine of Hippo from his death in 430 to 2000 CE.

== Selected book publications ==
- K. Pollman, The Baptized Muse: Early Christian Poetry as Cultural Authority (Oxford 2016)
- K. Pollmann et al. (eds), The Oxford Guide to the Historical Reception of Augustine (Oxford 2013)
- S.-P. Bergjan/K. Pollmann (eds), Patristic Tradition and Intellectual Paradigms in the 17th Century (Tübingen 2010)
- O. Wischmeyer, K. Pollmann et al. (eds), Lexikon der Bibelhermeneutik (Berlin 2009)
- K. Pollmann/V. Drecoll (eds), Augustinrezeption durch die Jahrhunderte, ZAC 11/1 (2007)
- W. Otten/K. Pollmann (eds), Poetry and Exegesis (Leiden 2007)
- K. Pollmann/M. Vessey (eds), Augustine and the Disciplines (Oxford 2005; paperback 2007)
- K. Pollmann, Statius, Thebaid 12. Introduction, Text, and Commentary (Paderborn 2004)
- R. Todd, K. Pollmann et al. (eds), Thoemmes Dictionary of British Classicists, 3 volumes (Bristol 2004)
- K. Pollmann, Saint Augustine the Algerian (Göttingen 2003; 2nd edition, 2007)
- K. Pollmann, Augustinus, Christliche Bildung (Reclam translation with notes and epilogue of Augustine, De doctrina christiana) (Stuttgart 2002)
- K. Pollmann (ed.), Double Standards in the Ancient and Medieval World (Göttingen 2000)
- M. Vessey/K. Pollmann/A. Fitzgerald (eds), History, Apocalypse, and the Secular Imagination. New Essays on Augustine, City of God (Villanova 1999)
- K. Pollmann, Doctrina Christiana. Untersuchungen zu den Anfängen der christlichen Hermeneutik unter besonderer Berücksichtigung von Augustinus, De doctrina christiana (Fribourg/CH 1996)
- J. Fontaine/R. Herzog/K. Pollmann (eds), Patristique et antiquité tardive en France et Allemagne de 1870 à 1930: Influences et changes. Actes du colloque Franco-allemand de Chantilly (25-27 octobre 1991) (Paris 1993)
- K. Pollmann, Das Carmen adversus Marcionitas. Einleitung, Text, Übersetzung und Kommentar (Göttingen 1991)
