= University of Tübingen =

Public research university in Tübingen, Germany

- Eberhard Karls Universität Tübingen
- Latin: Universitatis Tubingensis
- Motto: Attempto!
- Motto in English: I dare!
- Type: Public
- Established: 9 October 1477; 548 years ago
- Academic affiliations: U15, German Universities Excellence Initiative, Guild of European Research-Intensive Universities, MNU
- Budget: EUR 766.5 million
- Rector: Karla Pollmann
- Academic staff: 6,146
- Administrative staff: 2,524
- Students: 28,619 (WS2023/24)
- Undergraduates: c. 16,150 (WS2023/24
- Postgraduates: c. 12,469 (WS2023/24)
- Doctoral students: c. 2,000 (WS2023/24)
- Location: Tübingen, Baden-Württemberg, Germany; 48°31′30″N 09°03′32″E
- Campus: Urban (University town)
- Colours
- Website: uni-tuebingen.de
- Location within Germany Location within Baden-Württemberg

The University of Tübingen, officially the Eberhard Karls University of Tübingen (German: Eberhard Karls Universität Tübingen; Latin: Universitas Eberhardina Carolina), is a public research university located in the city of Tübingen, Baden-Württemberg, Germany.

The University of Tübingen is one of eleven German Excellence Universities. The University of Tübingen is especially known as a centre for the study of plant biology, medicine, law, archeology, ancient cultures, philosophy, theology, religious studies, humanities, and more recently as a center of excellence for artificial intelligence. The university's noted alumni and faculty include presidents, a pope, EU Commissioners, judges of the Federal Constitutional Court, and Johannes Kepler. The university is associated with eleven Nobel laureates, especially in the fields of medicine and chemistry.

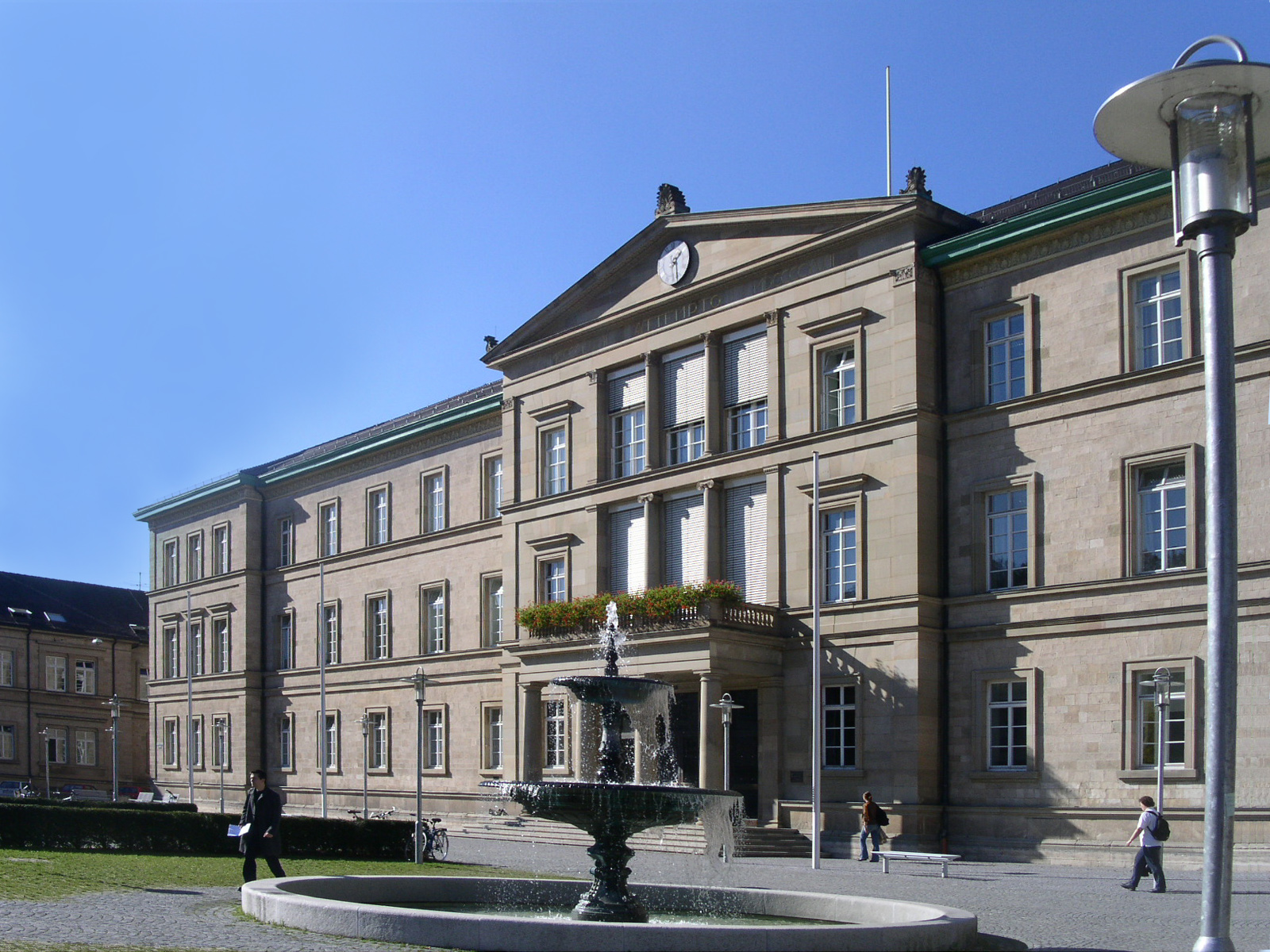
The Neue Aula

== History ==
The University of Tübingen was founded in 1477 by Count Eberhard V ("Eberhard the bearded", 1445–1496), who was later elevated to become the first Duke of Württemberg (then as Eberhard I). Eberhard was a civic and ecclesiastic reformer who established the school after becoming absorbed in the Renaissance revival of learning during his travels to Italy. Its first rector was Johannes Nauclerus. During an outbreak of the plague in Tübingen in 1482, the university's staff and students sought refuge in increasingly distant towns, moving to Dornstetten, Rottenburg, Urach, and finally Waiblingen. The university only returned to Tübingen in 1483.

Its present name was conferred on it in 1769 by Duke Carl Eugen (Note: Both spellings of the duke's name – Carl Eugen and Karl Eugen – were and are in use. Carl is the older version preferred by historians, although the spelling Karl is used in the university's name.) who appended his first name to that of the founder. The university later became the principal university of the Kingdom of Württemberg. Today, it is one of nine state universities funded by the German federal state of Baden-Württemberg.

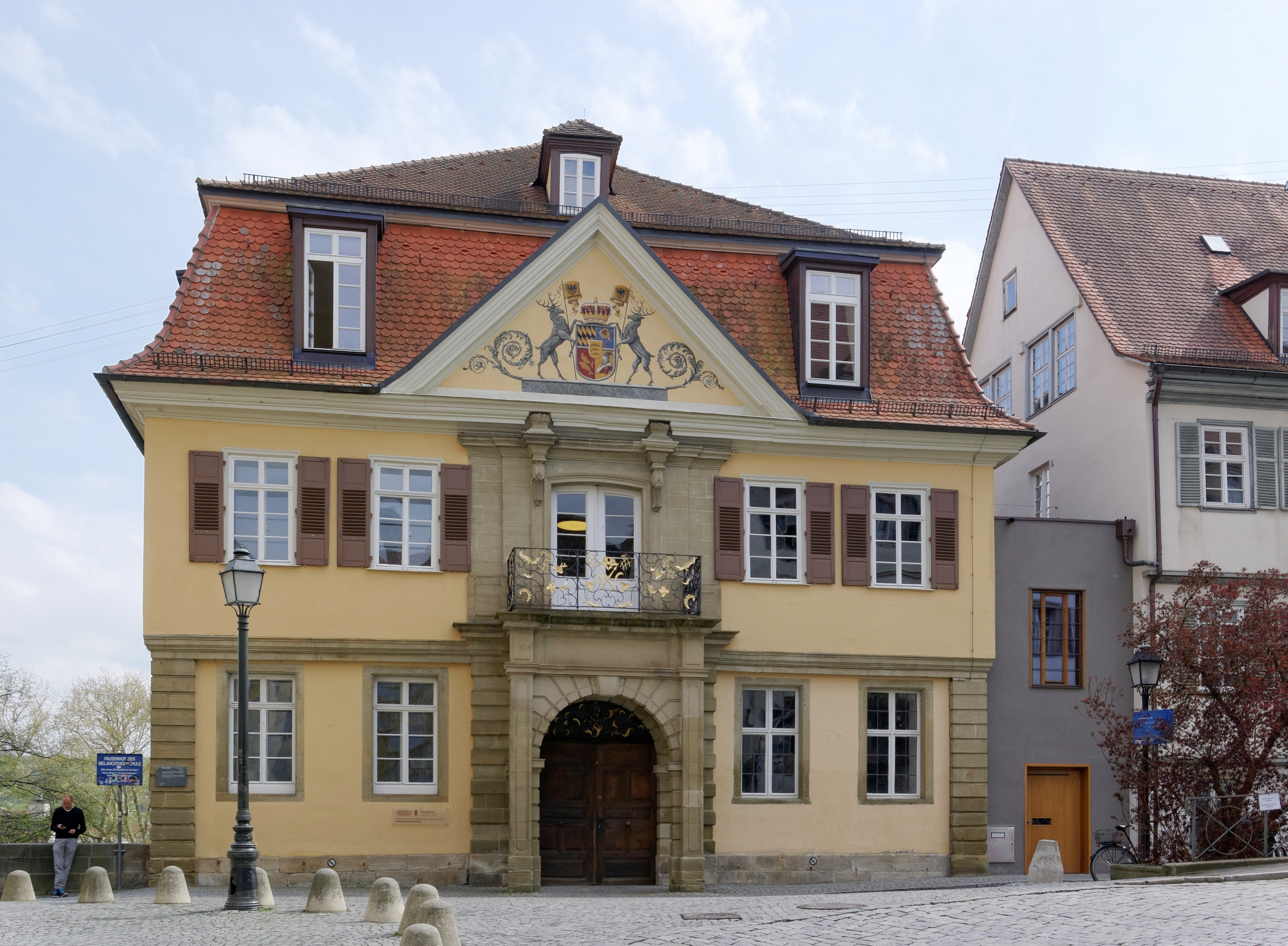
The Alte Aula (Old Auditorium)

The University of Tübingen has a history of innovative thought, particularly in theology, in which the university and the Tübinger Stift are famous to this day. Philip Melanchthon, the prime mover in building the German school system and a chief figure in the Protestant Reformation, helped establish its direction. Among Tübingen's eminent students and staff are astronomer Johannes Kepler; economist Horst Köhler (President of Germany); theologian Joseph Ratzinger (Pope Benedict XVI), poet Friedrich Hölderlin, and philosophers Friedrich Schelling and Georg Wilhelm Friedrich Hegel. The "Tübingen Three" refers to Hölderlin, Hegel and Schelling, who were roommates at the Tübinger Stift. Theologian Helmut Thielicke revived postwar Tübingen when he took over a professorship at the reopened theological faculty in 1947, being made administrative head of the university and President of the Chancellor's Conference in 1951. Philosopher and theologian Ernst Bloch is also associated with Tübingen's postwar revival.

The university rose to the height of its prominence in the middle of the 19th century with the teachings of poet and civic leader Ludwig Uhland and the Protestant theologian Ferdinand Christian Baur, whose circle, colleagues and students became known as the "Tübingen School", which pioneered the historical-critical analysis of biblical and early Christian texts, an approach generally referred to as "higher criticism". The University of Tübingen also was the first German university to establish a faculty of natural sciences, in 1863. DNA was discovered in 1868 at the University of Tübingen by Friedrich Miescher. Christiane Nüsslein-Volhard, the first female Nobel Prize winner in medicine in Germany, also works at Tübingen. The faculty for economics and business was founded in 1817 as the "Staatswissenschaftliche Fakultät" and was the first of its kind in Germany.

Starting in the late 1990s at Tübingen, fundamental research on mRNA-based substances (e.g. for cancer treatment and vaccines) was conducted by groups led by H. G. Rammensee and G. Jung. This work contributed to the Ph.D. and later research of Ingmar Hoerr and by extension to the COVID-19 vaccine programs by BioNTech, Moderna and CureVac.

=== Nazi period ===
The university played a leading role in efforts to legitimize the policies of the Third Reich as "scientific". Even before the victory of the Nazi Party in the general election in March 1933, there were hardly any Jewish faculty and few Jewish students. Antisemitism and national-conservative tendencies had already been widespread at the university among professors and students before the Nazis' seizure of control.

The University of Tübingen was the German university that dismissed the fewest Jewish employees after the introduction of the "Law for the Restoration of the Professional Civil Service" in 1933. This was not because the university had opposed Nazi orders, but because the lack of Jewish scholars or students at the university.

Physicist Hans Bethe was dismissed on 20 April 1933 because of "non-Aryan" origin. Religion professor Traugott Konstantin Oesterreich and the mathematician Erich Kamke were forced to take early retirement, probably in both cases because of the 'non-Aryan' origin of their wives. At least 1,158 people were sterilized at the University Hospital.

There was no significant resistance to National Socialism at the University of Tübingen.

=== After the war ===
In 1966, Joseph Ratzinger, who would later become Pope Benedict XVI, was appointed to a chair in dogmatic theology in the Faculty of Catholic Theology at Tübingen, where he was a colleague of Hans Küng.

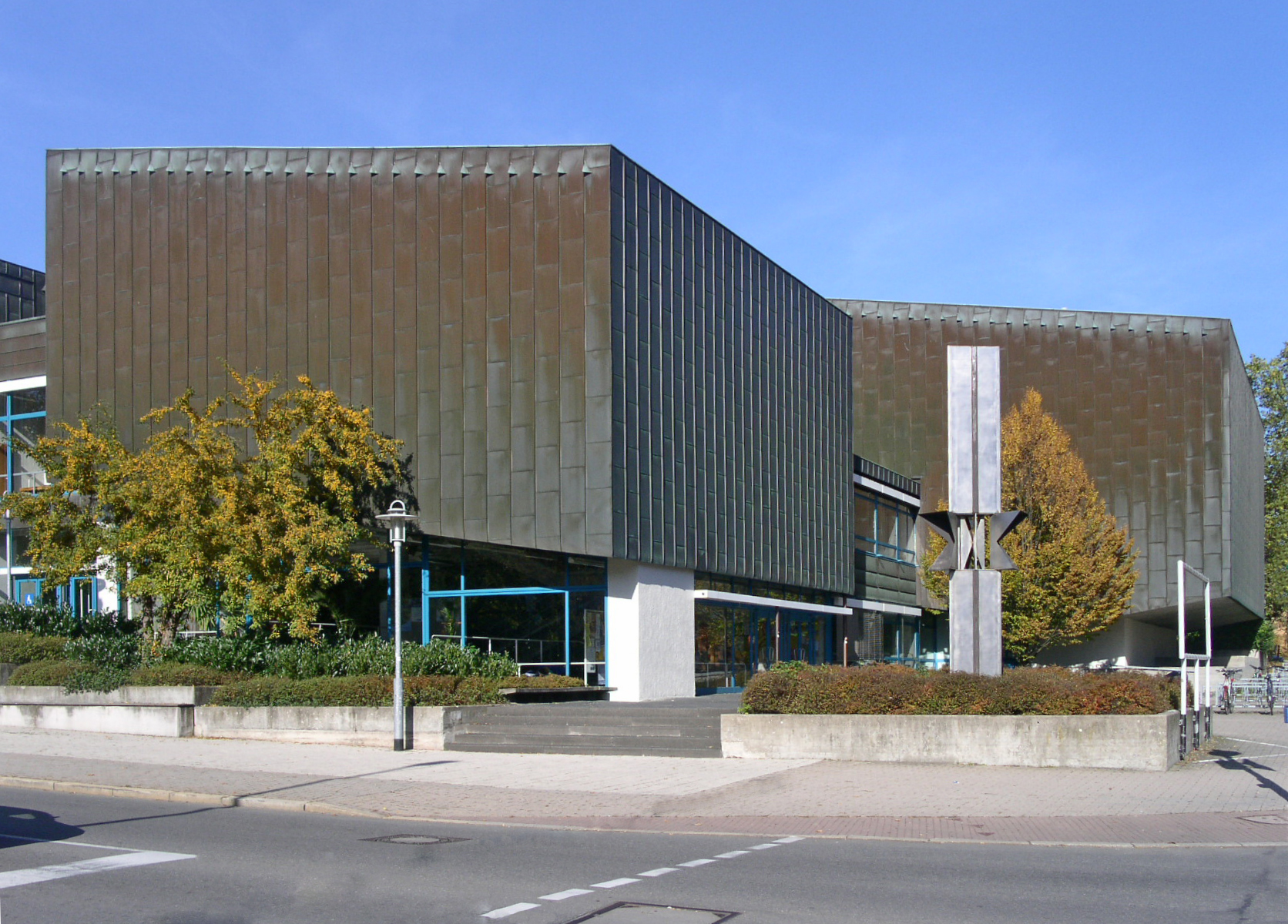
Kupferbau Auditorium

In 1967, Jürgen Moltmann (b. 1926), one of the most influential Protestant theologians of the 20th century, was appointed Professor of Systematic Theology in the Faculty of Protestant Theology. Drafted in 1944 by Nazi Germany, he was an Allied prisoner of war 1945–1948. He was influenced by his Tübingen colleague and friend the Marxist philosopher Ernst Bloch.In 1970, the university was restructured into a series of faculties as independent departments of study and research after the manner of French universities.

Baden-Württemberg, governed by the CDU/FDP, was one of the first federal states to introduce tuition fees. These were introduced in 2007 and also levied in Tübingen. Tuition fees were abolished in 2012. The university made the headlines in November 2009 when a group of left-leaning students occupied one of the main lecture halls, the Kupferbau, for several days to protest tuition fees. They demanded free education for everyone.

In May 2010, Tübingen joined the Matariki Network of Universities (MNU) together with Dartmouth College (US), Durham University (UK), Queen's University (Canada), University of Otago (New Zealand), University of Western Australia (Australia) and Uppsala University (Sweden).

On 27 April 2022, for the first time, a woman was elected Rector in the person of Karla Pollmann.

== Name ==
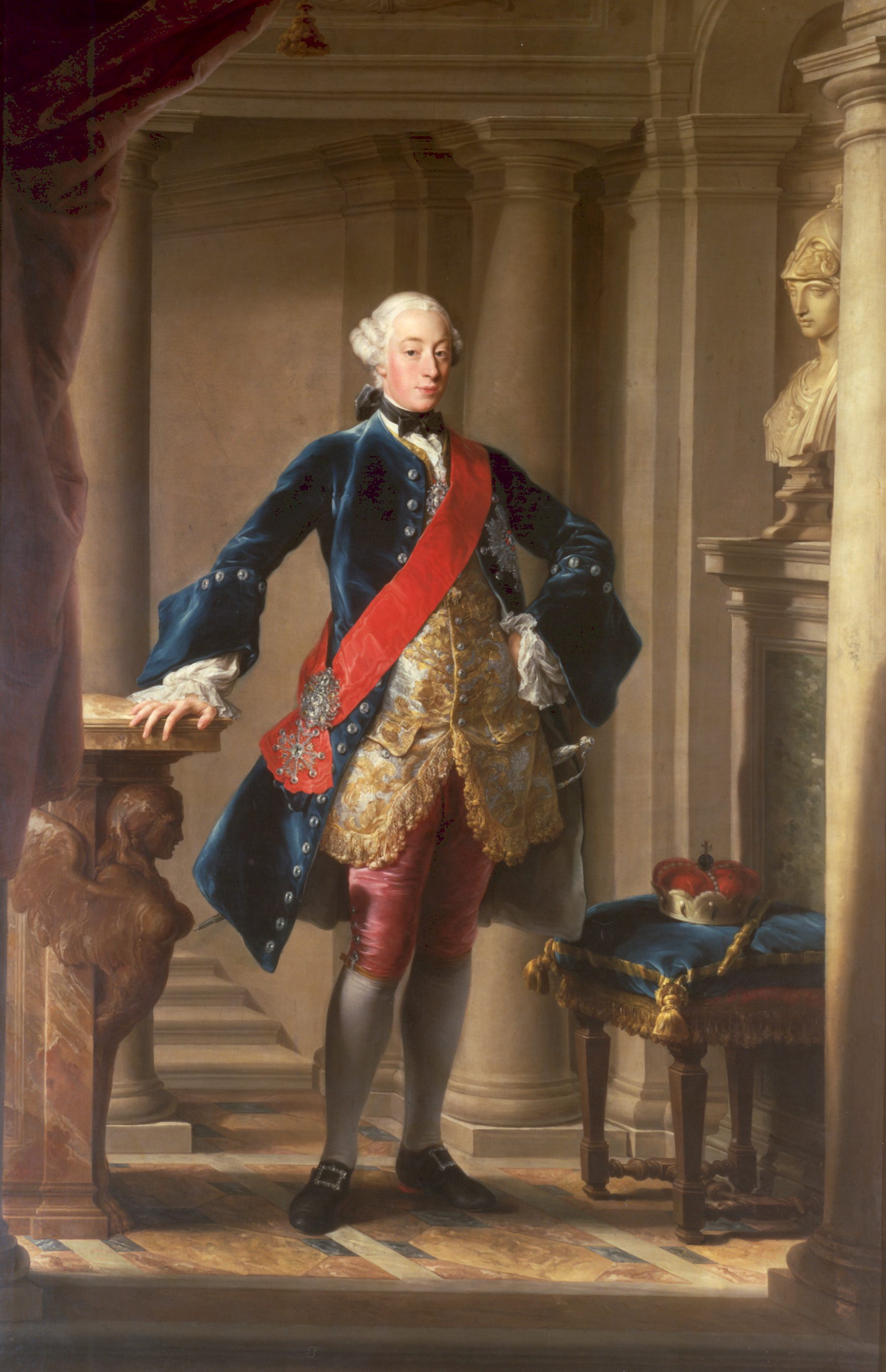
Carl Eugen gave the University its modern name.

The university's double name stems from 1769 and references its founder Eberhard I, Duke of Württemberg, and Duke Carl Eugen. Since the 1970s, Tübingen students and academia have discussed a possible renaming of the university due to the history of its namesakes. In August 1977, students spontaneously changed the name of the university to "Ernst Bloch University" in memory of the renowned Tübingen philosopher Ernst Bloch, adding a new sign to the Neue Aula, the traditional university's main building.

In 2022, the student council and the Juso university group, among others, submitted a motion to the university senate to remove both names. The senate commissioned a study by historians to determine how the namesakes should be evaluated. The study found that Count Eberhard was characterized by religious anti-Judaism: his 1477 charter for the university's founding explicitly stipulated that Jews were not to be allowed to live in Tübingen; he expanded this stance in his 1492 will, in which he charged his heirs with arranging for the expulsion of all Jews from Württemberg. The study noted these provisions had "far-reaching significance for Württemberg's politics, which had been characterized by fierce antisemitism since the end of the 15th century." The same study found Carl Eugen was an absolutist ruler "who ruthlessly exploited his country and his subjects", including selling his country's soldiers to foreign nations as mercenaries for profit. However, the report concluded that both rulers showed attitudes typical of their time, including Eberhard's anti-Judaism and Carl Eugen's authoritarianism, rather than holding uniquely problematic positions relative to their contempories. The head of the commission stated that there had been no consensus within the group on the question of whether to keep or change the name.

Students responded that both potentates remained unsuitable as namesakes of a university in the 21st century. In July 2022, 15 members of the university's senate voted in favor of the renaming motion, while 16 voted against, and two members abstained. A two-thirds majority would have been required for a renaming.

== Research focus ==
The University of Tübingen undertakes a broad range of research projects in various fields. Among the more prominent ones in the natural sciences are the Hertie Institute for Clinical Brain Research, which focuses on general, cognitive and cellular neurology as well as neurodegeneration, and the Centre for Interdisciplinary Clinical Research, which deals primarily with cell biology in diagnostics and therapy of organ system diseases. In the liberal arts, the University of Tübingen is noteworthy for having the only faculty of rhetoric in Germany – the department was founded by Walter Jens, an important intellectual and literary critic. The university also boasts continued pre-eminence in its centuries-old traditions of research in the fields of philosophy, theology and philology. Since at least the 19th century, Tübingen has been the home of world-class research in prehistoric studies and the study of antiquity, including the study of the ancient Near East; a particular focus of the research in these areas at the University of Tübingen has been Anatolia, e.g., through the continued excavations of the university at Troy. The University of Tübingen is also host to a number of Collaborative Research Centres, producing fundamental interdisciplinary research.

The Coin Collection of the Institute of Classical Archaeology at the University of Tübingen [Münzsammlung des Instituts für Klassische Archäologie der Universität Tübingen] is one of the largest coin collections in Germany. The current Director is Prof. Dr. Stefan Krmnicek.

== Campus ==
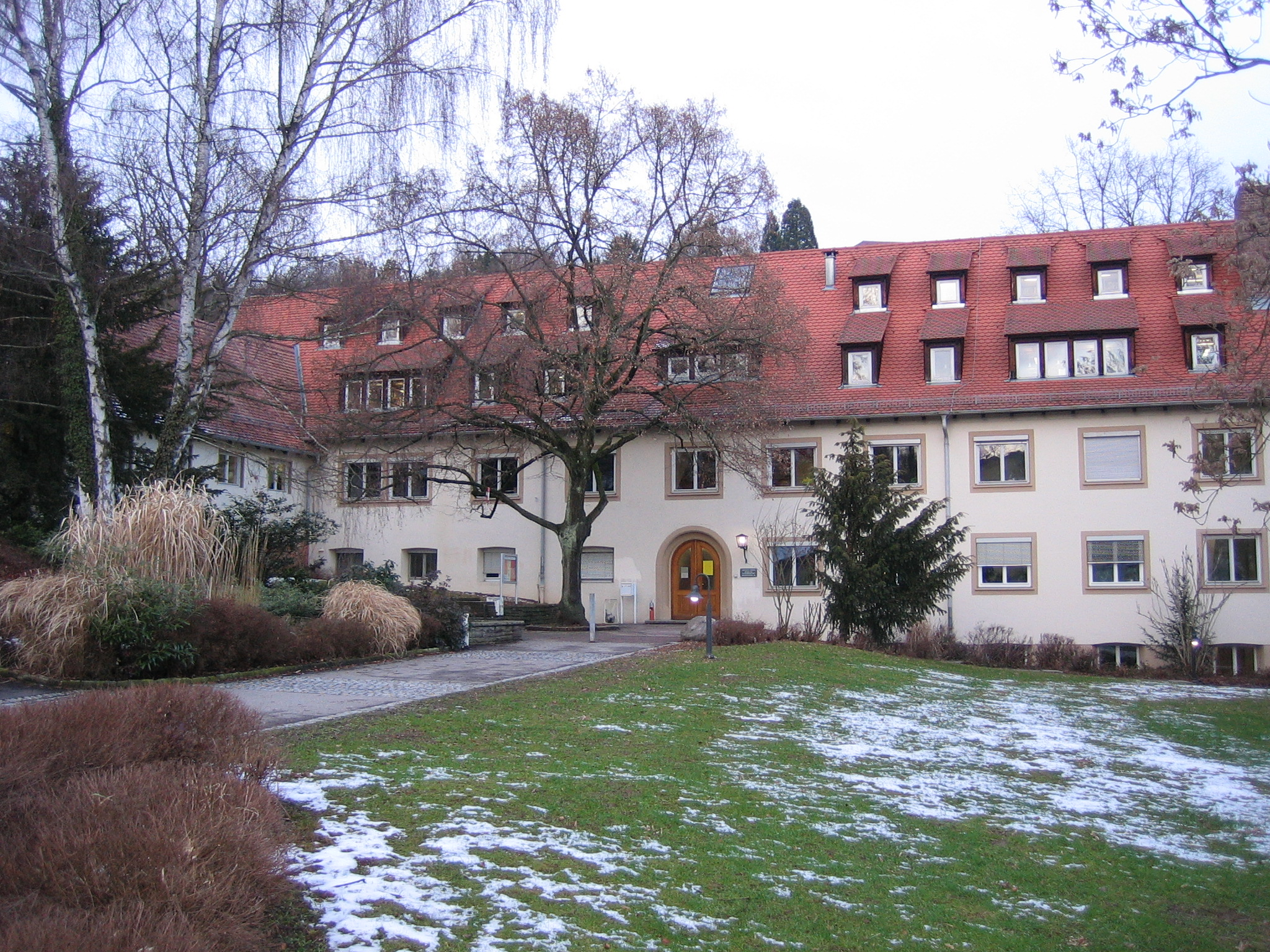
Institute of Political Science

The University of Tübingen is not a campus university, but is spread throughout the town: Tübingen is one of five classical "university towns" in Germany. The other four are Marburg, Göttingen, Freiburg and Heidelberg. In Tübingen there are four areas with a major concentration of university institutions.

- The university uses a number of buildings in the old town of Tübingen, some of which date back to the foundation of the university. Today, these are mainly used by smaller humanities departments, as is the adjacent medieval castle, Schloss Hohentübingen.
- Northeast of the old town, the Wilhelmstraße area surrounding the street of the same name is home to larger humanities departments as well as the university's administration. The main university library and main refectory are also in this area.
- A new campus for the sciences was built in the 1970s at Morgenstelle, a hill north of the historic centre of Tübingen. Facilities include a large refectory.
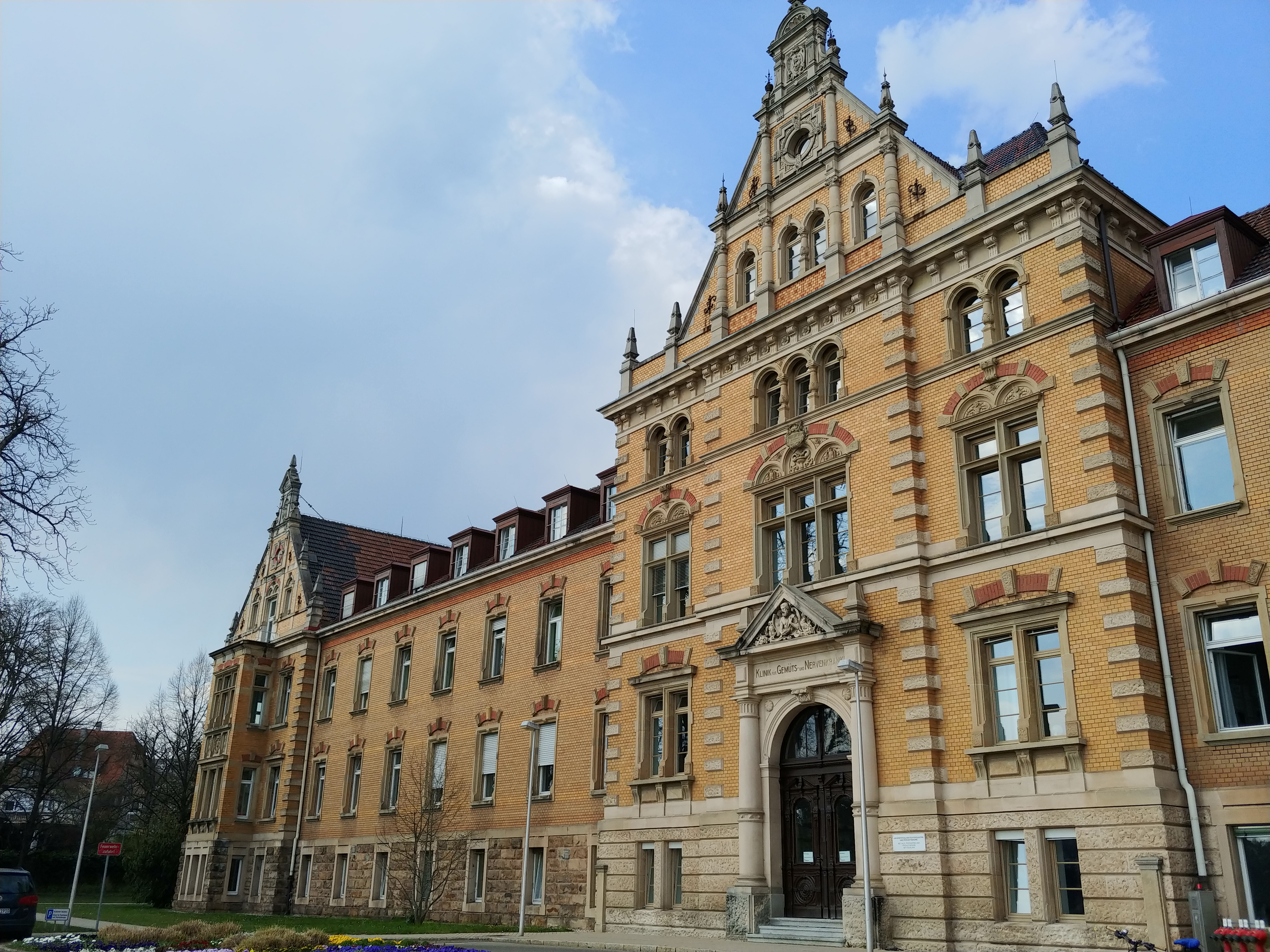
  Department of Psychiatry and Psychotherapy, part of the Klinikum
- The university's teaching hospitals are located between the Wilhelmstraße area and the Morgenstelle campus in an area collectively known as the Klinikum. The 17 hospitals in Tübingen affiliated with the university's faculty of medicine have 1,500 patient beds, and cater to 66,000 in-patients and 200,000 out-patients on an annual basis.

Accommodation provided by the Tübingen Studentenwerk is in several locations throughout the town. The largest of the eleven halls of residence are in the city's northern neighbourhood of Waldhäuser Ost (1,700 rooms) and in the city's southeasternmost neighbourhood, Französisches Viertel (500 rooms).

== Museum ==
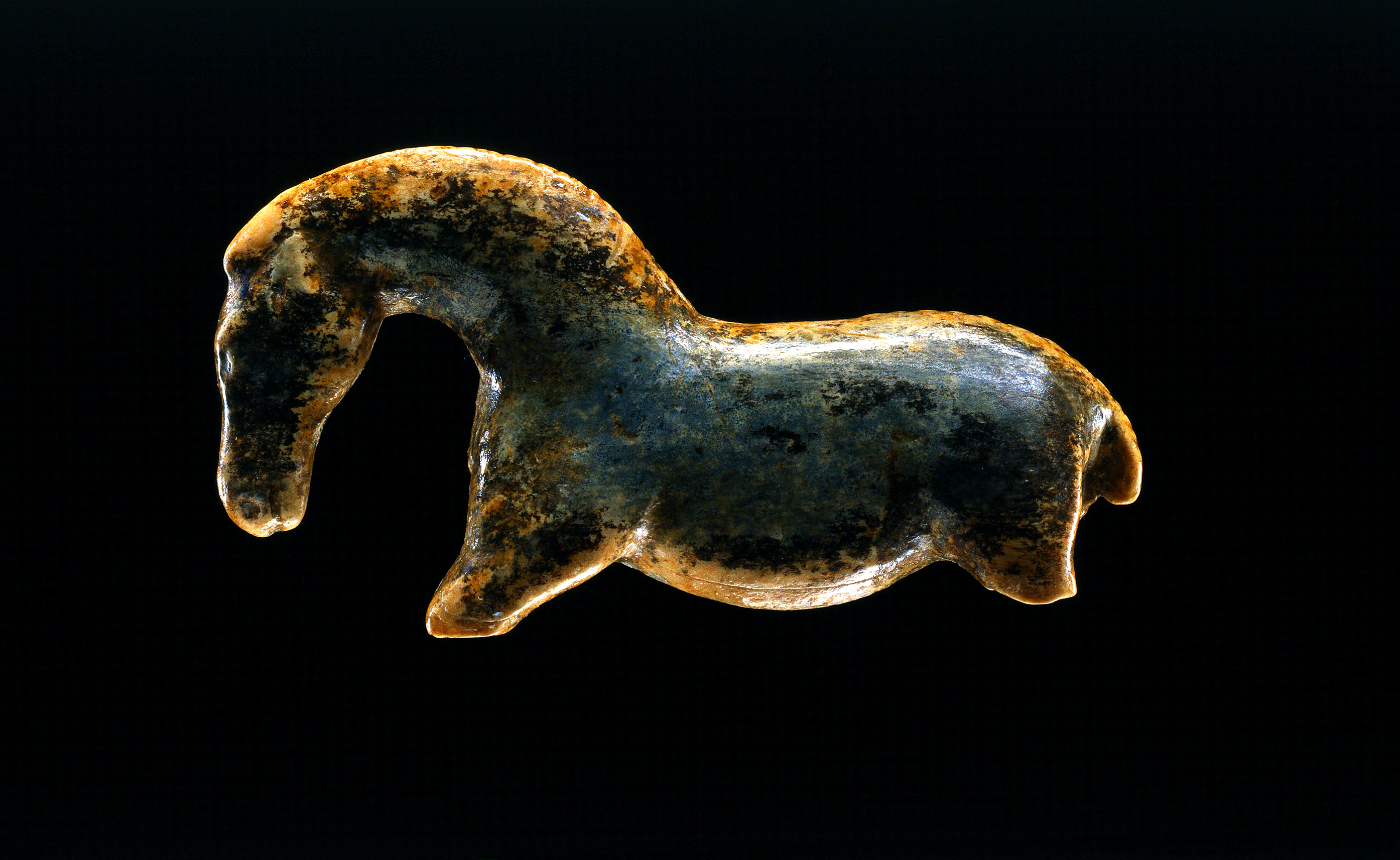
Wild horse figurine Urpferd from the Vogelherdhöhle (40,000 years), UNESCO World Heritage

In 2006, the Museum of the University of Tübingen (MUT) was founded to professionalize the 60 sometimes very old and singular teaching, show and research collections of the university from all faculties in terms of collection, curatorial and organizational aspects. One aim was to present the collections to the public through interdisciplinary exhibitions, as well as to study them scientifically.

MUT is based at Schloss Hohentübingen (Hohentübingen Castle), which houses the Schlosslabor (castle laboratory) and the collections of the Museum Alte Kulturen (Museum of Ancient Cultures). Among the latter's highlights are the mammoth, the wild horse, the Tübingen Hoplitodromos Runner, and an Egyptian burial chamber. The Botanical Garden, the Paleontological Collection and the Psychological Collection are particularly popular with the public.

MUT offers its own German-speaking profile programme "Museum & Collections", which is a collaboration between the museum and several art, cultural studies and history departments within the university.

The MUT – and thus the Eberhard Karls University of Tübingen – is the only university institution in the world to house artefacts with World Heritage status, such as the oldest surviving figurative works of art and musical instruments of humanity, mammoth ivory figures and fragments of bone flutes. These come from the Vogelherdhöhle (Swabian Jura), which has been part of the UNESCO World Heritage "Caves and Ice Age Art in the Swabian Jura" since 2017.

== Libraries ==
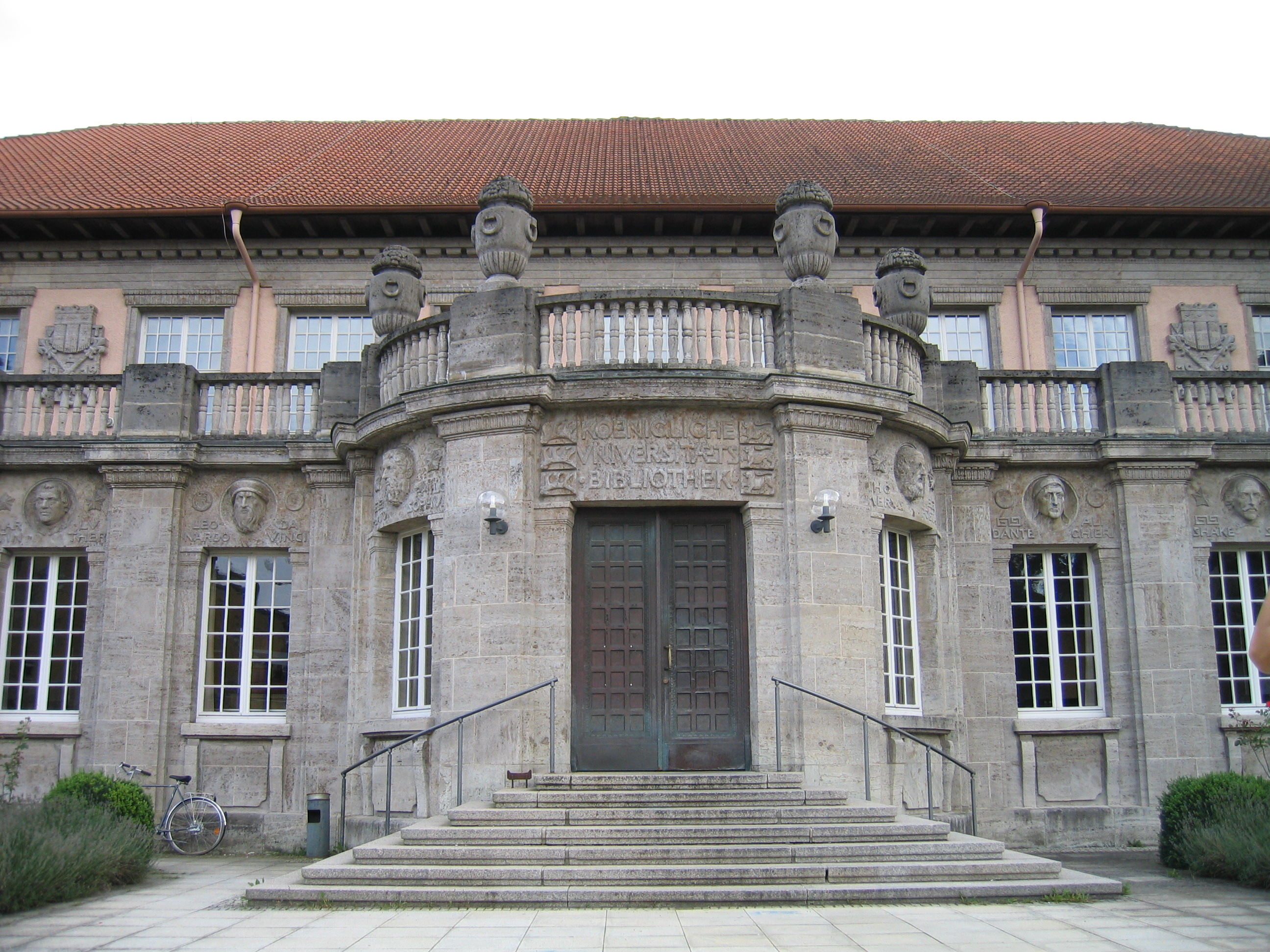
Entrance to the Historical Reading Hall of the University Library of Tübingen

The University Library of Tübingen is not just available to those affiliated with the university, but also to the general public. The library holds more than three million volumes and more than 7,600 journals. Apart from the main library, over 80 departmental libraries containing an additional three million items are also associated with the university.The main lending library is located on Wilhelmstraße and consists of several different parts which are connected through corridors and walkways:

- The Bonatzbau, the library's oldest building, dates from 1912 and currently houses the Historischer Lesesaal (historic reading room), the university archive, along with a number of manuscript collections.
- The library's main building, constructed in 1963, contains the information desk and research stations to access electronic catalogues and databases.
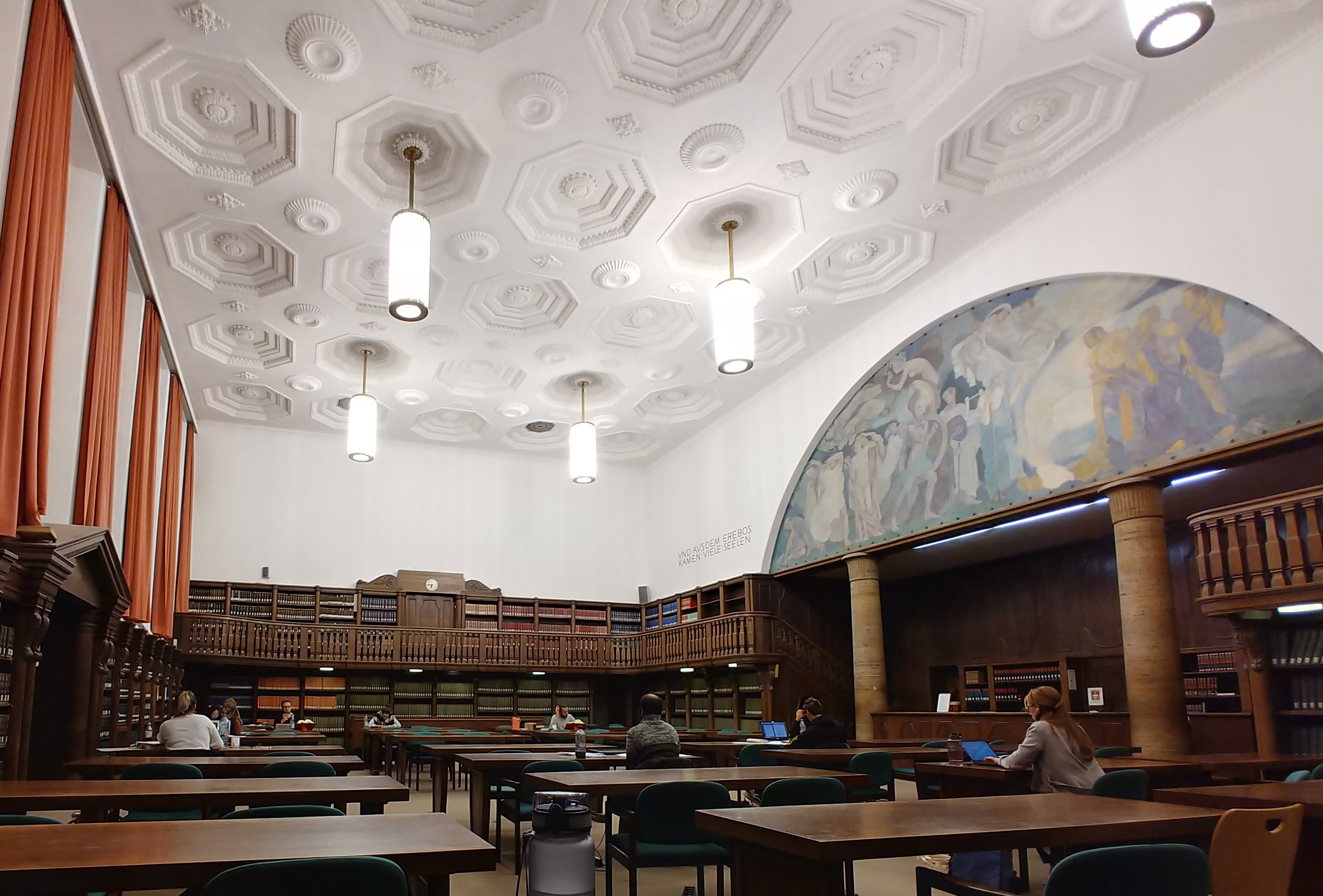
- Interior of the Historical Reading Hall
  The Ammerbau is the most recent addition to the library complex. Built in 2002, it offers users direct access to over 300,000 volumes and latest issues of newspapers, magazines and journals. It also contains numerous work places and separate individual rooms for group work.

== Organisation ==
=== Faculties ===
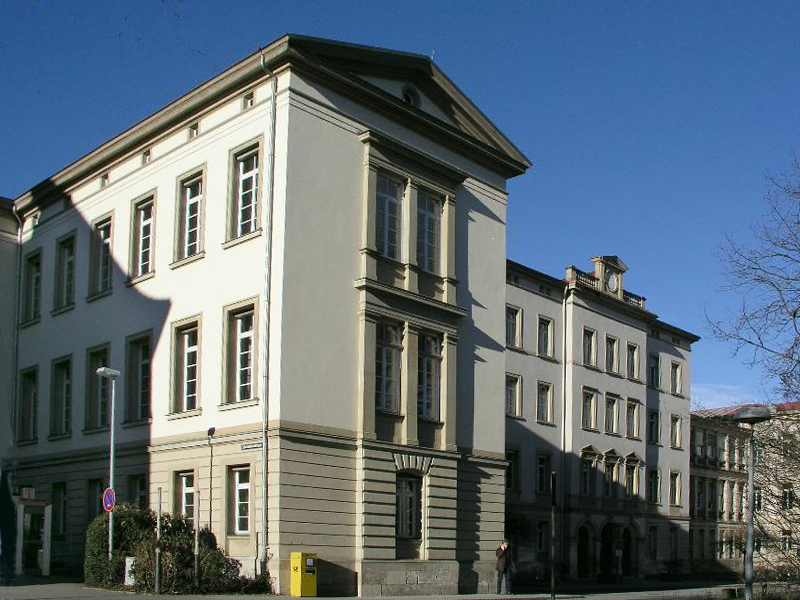
Theologicum

The university is made up of seven faculties, some of which are subdivided into further departments.

- Protestant Theology
- Catholic Theology
- Law
- Medicine
- Humanities
- Economics and Social Sciences
- Science

=== Governance ===
The university is governed by three separate bodies sharing different functions and duties. However, some persons serve in more than one body.

The Rectorate is the executive component of the university's governing body. The current rector, Professor Karla Pollmann, is supported by four deputies consisting of three prorectors and one provost. All are also permanent members of the university senate.

The Senate forms the legislative section of governance. Apart from the members of the rectorate, it includes the equal opportunities commissioner, the deans and 20 elected members representing the professors, lecturers, students and non-academic staff. Two advisors represent the university's teaching hospitals.

The University Council (Hochschulrat or Universitätsrat) has 13 members, including its president and vice-president as well as five further internal and six external members.

== Rankings and reputation ==
University rankings

Overall – Global & National
QS World 2025	=222	11
THE World 2025	=100	8
ARWU World 2023	151–200	6–9

As of the 2024 edition of the QS World University Rankings, the University of Tübingen ranks 213th globally, which places it at 11th position nationally within Germany. The university's rank appears significantly higher in the 2024 Times Higher Education World University Rankings, 95th globally and 8th nationally. The Academic Ranking of World Universities, also known as the Shanghai Ranking, for the year 2023 places the University of Tübingen in the 151–200 bracket globally, and within the 6–9 bracket in the national ranking.

QS Subject Ranking 2023
Subject	Global	National
Arts & Humanities	▲74	5
Linguistics	101–150	4–10
Theology, Divinity and Religious Studies	▼8	1
Archaeology	▲12	▲1
Classics and Ancient History	▼29	▼6
English Language and Literature	▲151–200	6–7
History	51–100	5
Modern Languages	101–150	5–7
Philosophy	▼51–100	5–7
Engineering and Technology	N/A	N/A
Engineering – Chemical	▲301–350	12
Computer Science and Information Systems	301–350	15
Life Sciences & Medicine	▼125	▼5
Anatomy and Physiology	51–100	▲2–6
Biological Sciences	▲58	4
Medicine	▲104	▲5
Pharmacy and Pharmacology	101–150	▼7–9
Psychology	101–150	4–7
Natural Sciences	N/A	N/A
Earth and Marine Sciences	101–150	▼7–13
Environmental Sciences	151–200	▲6–10
Geology	101–150	7–13
Geophysics	101–150	▼7–13
Social Sciences & Management	▼389	▲12
Anthropology	51–100	3–5
Education and Training	101–150	▲2–5
Law and Legal Studies	151–200	8
Sociology	▼251–300	▼13–15

THE Subject Ranking 2023
Subject	Global	National
Arts & humanities	▼29	▼3
Education	▲ =43	▲1
Computer science	101–125	▼9–10
Clinical & health	▼98	▼6
Life sciences	▲ =57	▲5–6
Physical sciences	▼201–250	▼18–21
Psychology	▼ =74	▼4

ARWU Subject Ranking 2022
Subject	Global	National
Natural Sciences
Mathematics	201–300	12–18
Physics	301–400	▼24–28
Earth Sciences	101–150	▼5–12
Ecology	201–300	▲16–27
Atmospheric Science	▼201–300	▼15–20
Engineering
Biomedical Engineering	201–300	▲13–17
Computer Science & Engineering	▲301–400	▲11–13
Environmental Science & Engineering	101–150	3–4
Water Resources	▲101–150	▼4–8
Biotechnology	76–100	3–4
Life Sciences
Biological Sciences	101–150	▼12–13
Human Biological Sciences	76–100	9–12
Agricultural Sciences	▼201–300	▼19–23
Medical Sciences
Clinical Medicine	151–200	▲10–13
Public Health	301–400	▲12–22
Dentistry & Oral Sciences	▲151–200	▲14–21
Medical Technology	▼41	▼6
Pharmacy & Pharmaceutical Sciences	151–200	15–17
Social Sciences
Political Sciences	301–400	▼17–26
Education	76–100	1
Psychology	▼76–100	▼2–4

Since 2012, the University of Tübingen has been regarded as one of eleven German Excellence Universities that have been successful in the competition of the German Universities Excellence Initiative. The award brings additional research funds for five years. With three successful research Clusters of Excellence approved by the German Universities Excellence Initiative in 2018, Tübingen is one of the three universities with the highest research output in Germany and leading among universities in South Germany.

According to the funding report of the German Research Foundation (DFG) 2018, which breaks down the grants awarded to German universities from 2014 to 2016, the University of Tübingen was ranked 8th overall, 4th in humanities and social sciences, and 6th in life sciences including medicine. This ranking is based on a selection of best research projects nationwide and thus regarded as an indicator of the quality of research.

US News Best Global Universities also ranked Tübingen amongst the top ten universities in Germany overall in 2021.

Traditionally, Tübingen has been particularly strong in the fields of humanities, especially in theology and religious studies, medicine, and law. The Tübingen Law School was ranked second nationwide by the Wirtschaftswoche University Ranking. Also according to international rankings, Tübingen regularly ranks among the top ten law schools in Germany.

=== Controversies ===
Since 2018, the university has been part of a wider artificial intelligence research initiative named Cyber Valley. Cyber Valley has seen investments from multinational companies poured into establishing research centers, research groups, and professorships in the city. The investing organisations and corporations include Google, Amazon, BMW, IAV, Daimler, Porsche, and Bosch. The Cyber Valley initiative has attracted criticism from student groups and activist groups alike, with many protest actions, including building occupations and demonstrations, having taken place decrying both the commercialisation of university research and the involvement of the university with organisations that are engaged in military research.

== Student life ==
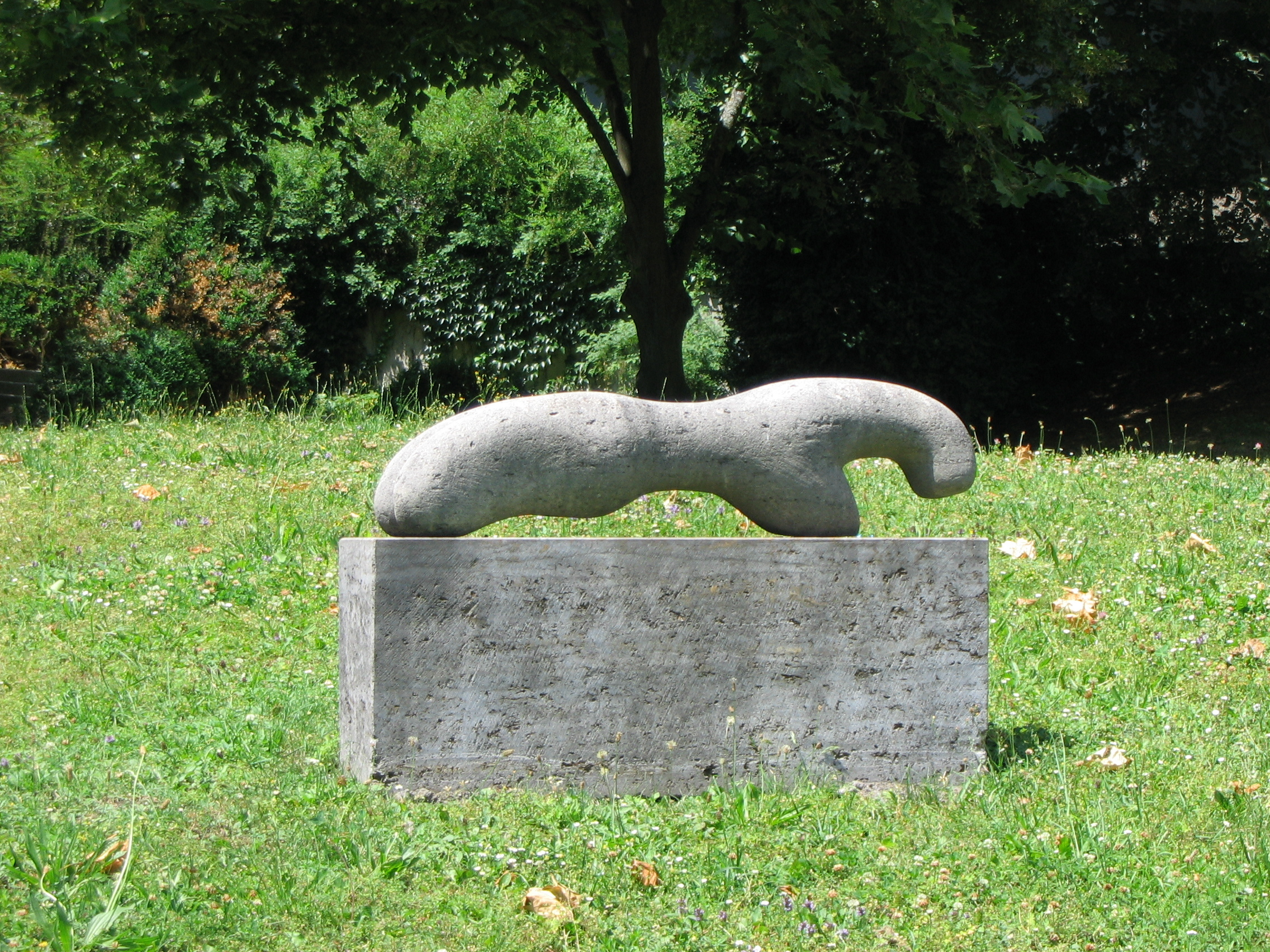
Sculpture Urpferd at campus Morgenstelle

The university's students make up roughly a third of the total population of Tübingen and the town's culture can seem to be largely dominated by them. As a result there is a slump of activity during university holidays, particularly over the summer when a large number of otherwise regular events are not happening.

Around 30 Studentenverbindungen, the German type of fraternities, are associated with the university. While famous for their parties, public academic lectures and the yearly "Stocherkahn-Rennen" punting-boat race on the Neckar river, some of them are the subject of ongoing controversy surrounding alleged right-wing policial views, leading to strong criticism from leftist groups. The university itself takes a neutral stance on this issue. However, all of Tübingen's fraternities distance themselves from the fraternities of the Deutsche Burschenschaft, which have been widely criticized as adhering to far-right principles.

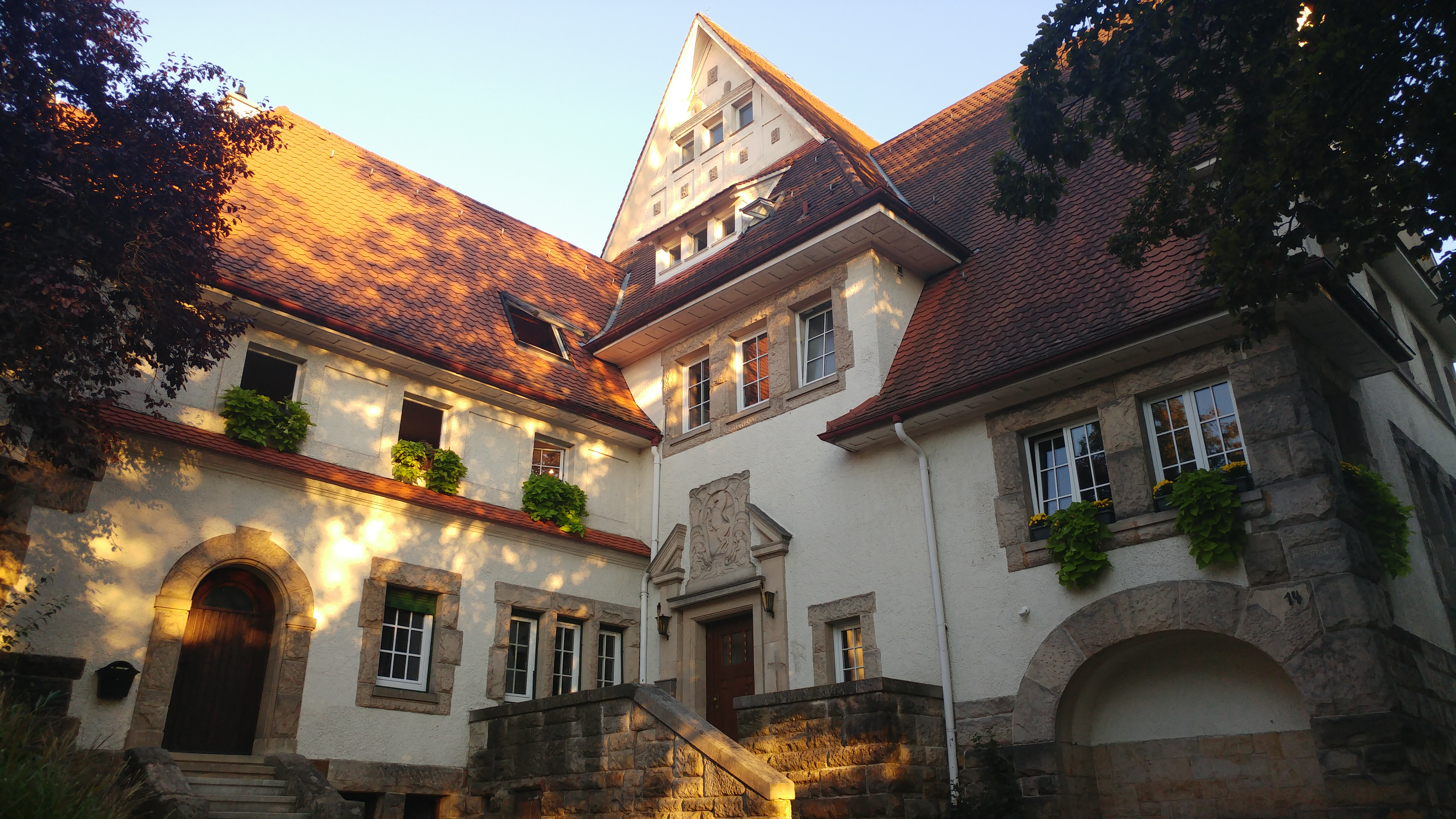
Fraternity house on the Österberg

Also closely linked to the university are a number of student societies representing mainly the arts and political parties. Most notable are a number of choirs as well as student theatre groups affiliated with the faculty of Modern Languages, some of which perform in foreign languages. Radio Uniwelle Tübingen is the university's radio station, airing seven hours of programmes a week produced by students under the supervision of staff employed by the university.

The university also offers gym and sports classes called Hochschulsport. Since Tübingen has a department of sports science with a broad range of facilities, students of other subjects have the possibility to participate in various kinds of sports courses in teams or as individuals. Furthermore, even exotic sports, such as parachuting or martial arts, are offered. Students may attend courses either for free or at reduced rates. The sports department is located close to the Wilhelmstraße area of university buildings and is served by a number of frequent bus routes.

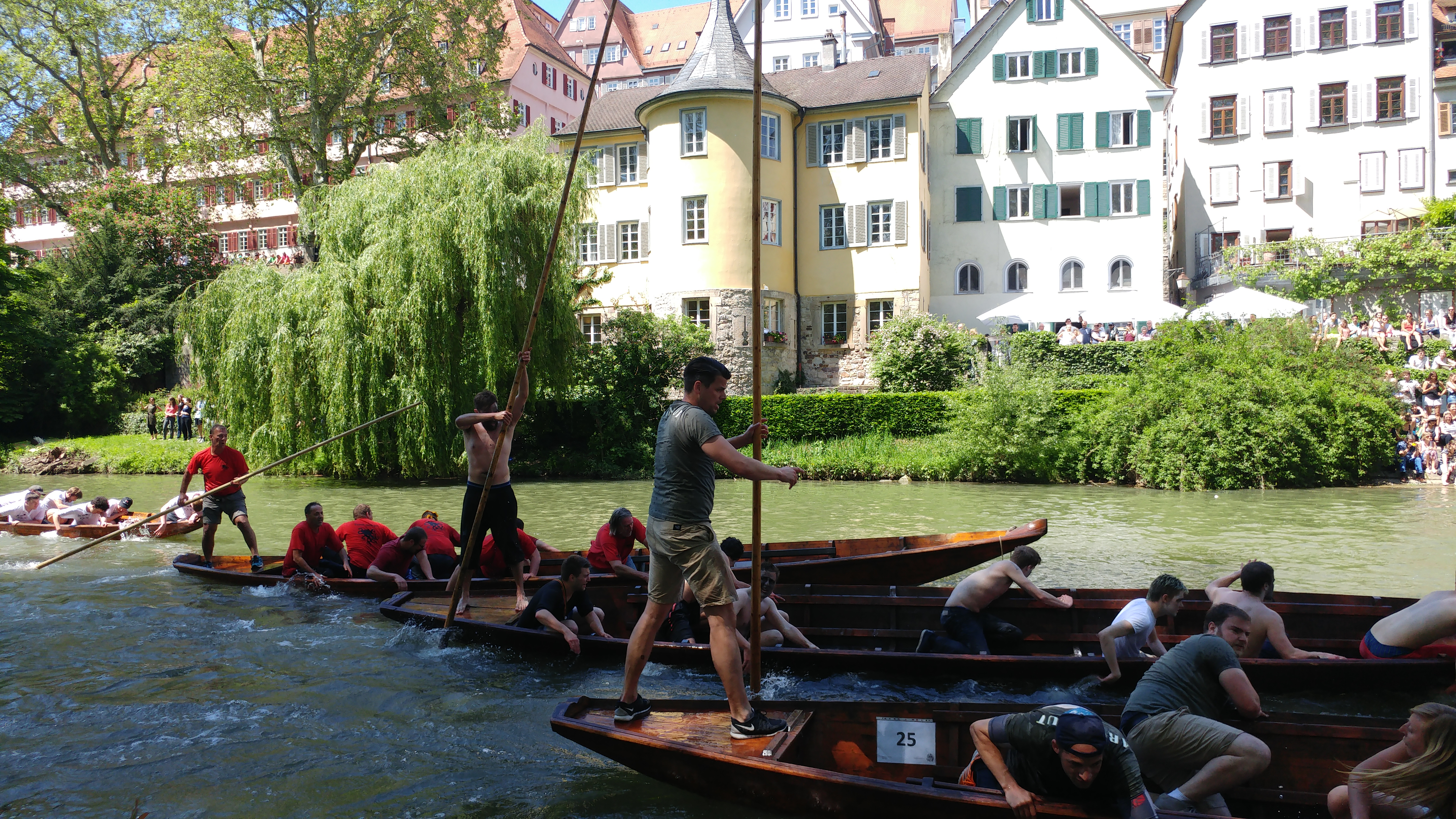
Stocherkähne during the traditional annual race

Unlike in some major cities, student discounts are not widely available in Tübingen. Cinemas and the town council's public library in particular do not offer discounts for students, and there are only a handful of restaurants which have reduced lunch deals. However, students may benefit from the Semesterticket, a heavily discounted public transport season pass offering six months of unlimited travel on trains and buses in the naldo Verkehrsverbund transport association for approximately €62.50. The Landestheater Tübingen theatre and all public swimming pools also have discounts for students.

Nightlife in Tübingen is centered on the numerous pubs in the old town along with a number of clubs, most of which dedicate themselves to non-mainstream music. During the semester, the Studentenwerk-owned Clubhaus at the centre of the Wilhelmstraße university area hosts the weekly Clubhausfest on Thursday nights. This popular, free-entry club night is organized and promoted by student societies and Fachschaft student representative bodies and all proceeds go towards their activities in support of students.

== Notable academic staff ==
- Thomas Iftner (born 1958), German virologist
- Eberhard Jüngel (1934–2021), German Lutheran theologian
- Christiane Nüsslein-Volhard (born 1942), German developmental biologist and 1995 Nobel Prize-winner
- Hildegard Temporini-Gräfin Vitzthum (1939–2004), German ancient historian
- Klaus Hartmann (1925–1991) German philosopher and university lecturer

== Notable alumni ==
The University of Tübingen has a long list of notable alumni and staff. As of 2023, eleven Nobel Laureates, 18 Leibniz Laureates and five Alexander von Humboldt Professorships are affiliated with the university.

Besides several Federal Ministers of Germany and Minister Presidents of German States, politicians associated with the University of Tübingen include six founding fathers of the Federal Republic of Germany, a Chancellor of Germany, two Presidents of Germany, and several European Commissioners.

As Tübingen has traditionally been home to one of the most prestigious law schools in Germany, alumni in the legal profession include at least 19 judges of the Federal Constitutional Court of Germany, the first female German judge at the European Court of Justice, an Advocate General at the European Court of Justice, as well as several judges at the Federal Court of Justice, the Federal Fiscal Court, and the Federal Labour Court. Notable legal scholars associated with Tübingen include Dieter Medicus, Klaus Hopt and Wolfgang Ernst.

Affiliates in the field of religious studies include many of the most influential theologians of the last centuries such as Pope Benedict XVI, Karl Barth, Dietrich Bonhoeffer, Eduard Mörike, Miroslav Volf, Paul Tillich, David Strauss and Philip Melanchthon. The field of religious studies in Tübingen has also been the educational center for philosophers Friedrich Schelling, Friedrich Hölderlin and Georg Wilhelm Friedrich Hegel. Tübingen is therefore sometimes considered the home of German idealism, a philosophical movement which had a severe impact on modern western thinking. After World War II progressive philosophers like Ernst Bloch upgraded the university after its failure in the Nazi era.

== Nobel laureates ==
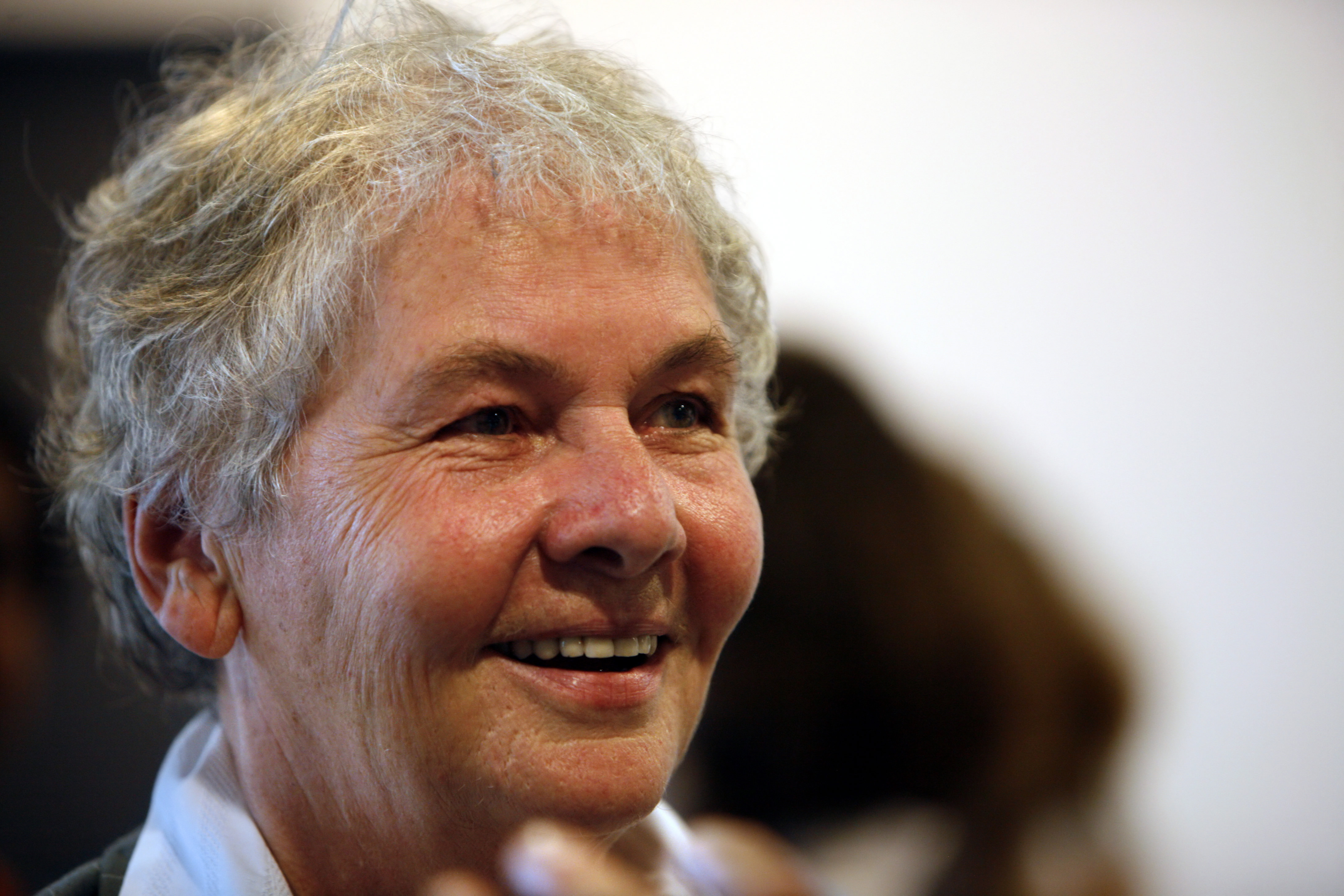
Christiane Nüsslein-Volhard (2007)

Faculty members and alumni who have been awarded the Nobel Prize:

- William Ramsay (1904, Chemistry)
- Eduard Buchner (1907, Chemistry), faculty
- Karl Ferdinand Braun (1909, Physics), faculty
- Fritz Pregl (1923, Chemistry)
- Adolf Butenandt (1939, Chemistry), faculty
- Hans Bethe (1967, Physics), faculty
- Georg Wittig (1979, Chemistry), faculty
- Hartmut Michel (1988, Chemistry)
- Bert Sakmann (1991, Medicine)
- Christiane Nüsslein-Volhard (1995, Medicine), faculty
- Günter Blobel (1999, Medicine)

== See also ==
- List of people associated with the University of Tübingen
- Efferenn's Trust
- List of medieval universities
- List of universities in Germany
- Friedrich Althoff
- Robert-Bosch-Hospital
- Pi-Chacán
- Plato's unwritten doctrines, for the influential Tübingen School of Plato interpretation
