= Polydamas of Skotoussa =

Late 5th-century BC Greek athlete

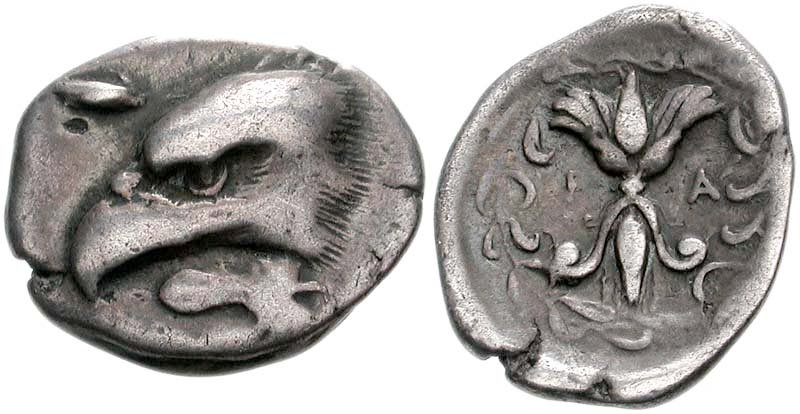
Hemidrachm, 416-404 BC, Olympia. 91-94th Olympiad

Polydamas of Skotoussa (Ancient Greek: Πολυδάμας ὁ Σκοτουσσαῖος, gen. Πολυδάμαντος, Polydámas, Polydámantos), son of Nicias, was a Thessalian pankratiast, and victor in the 93rd Olympiad (408 BC).

He was considered the mightiest man of his time, and extraordinary stories were told about his physical strength. According to ancient sources, he killed a huge lion on Mount Olympus without using any weapons. While Pausanias simply identifies the mountain as Olympus, the Suda specifically locates it in Macedonia. Pausanias further explains that Polydamas undertook this feat out of a desire to imitate Heracles, who had killed the Nemean lion.

Another remarkable feat attributed to him was his ability to enter a herd of cattle and seize the largest and fiercest bull by one of its hind legs, holding it so firmly that, when the animal finally escaped, it left its hoof in his hand. He was also said to have stopped a chariot travelling at great speed by seizing it with one hand and bringing the horses to a halt.

Diodorus Siculus also recounts that Polydamas could kill lions with his bare hands as easily as sheep and could outrun swift-running chariots.

His extraordinary reputation reached the Persian king Darius II, who, having heard of his exploits, persuaded him with promises of gifts to come to his court at Susa. There, Polydamas fought three Persian Immortals, who challenged him to single combat, one against three, and killed all three.

These exploits were commemorated on a statue of Polydamas at Olympia, which stood on a high pedestal and was made by the sculptor Lysippus. Pausanias describes the statue as representing Polydamas as the mightiest man of his time, except for those called heroes and other mortal races believed to have existed before them. He further explains that some of Polydamas's achievements were depicted on the pedestal, while others were recorded in its inscription.

Despite his extraordinary strength, Polydamas eventually met a tragic end. One summer, while he was in a cave with his companions, its roof began to crack and threatened to collapse. His companions fled, but Polydamas remained behind, raising his hands in the belief that he could hold up the falling roof and prevent the cave from collapsing. He was crushed beneath the rocks and died. Some ancient accounts state that Polydamas and his companions had taken shelter in the cave because of bad weather, and that a sudden influx of water weakened its structure, causing it to collapse. Pausanias and the Suda connect his death with Homer's warning about those who take pride in their strength. Valerius Maximus presents the incident as an example of how excessive bodily strength can be accompanied by a lack of sound judgement.

In The Parliament of the Gods, Lucian has Momus complain about the growing number of figures receiving divine honours, mentioning that Polydamas's statue at Olympia was believed to cure people suffering from fever. He compares this with Theagenes of Thasos, whose statue in Thasos was likewise associated with miraculous healing powers. Lucian also mentions Polydamas in How to Write History, alongside Theagenes of Thasos, as an example of an exceptional athlete whose natural physical abilities could not be reproduced through training alone. In addition, he mentions Polydamas in Essays in Portraiture Defended, alongside Milo of Croton and Glaucus of Carystus, citing the three athletes as examples of men renowned for their extraordinary physical strength.

== Sources ==
- Athletes' Stories-Perseus.Tufts.Edu
- Ancient Library
- Pausanias. Description of Greece, 6.5.4 - 6.5.9.
- Diodorus, 9.14.2.
