= E. glaucus =

E. glaucus may refer to:

- Elymus glaucus, the blue wild rye, a wild rye species native to North America from Alaska to New York to northern Mexico
- Erigeron glaucus, the seaside fleabane, beach aster or seaside daisy, a flowering plant species native to the coastline of Oregon and California

== See also ==
- Glaucus (disambiguation)
