= Theagenes of Thasos =

Ancient greek boxer

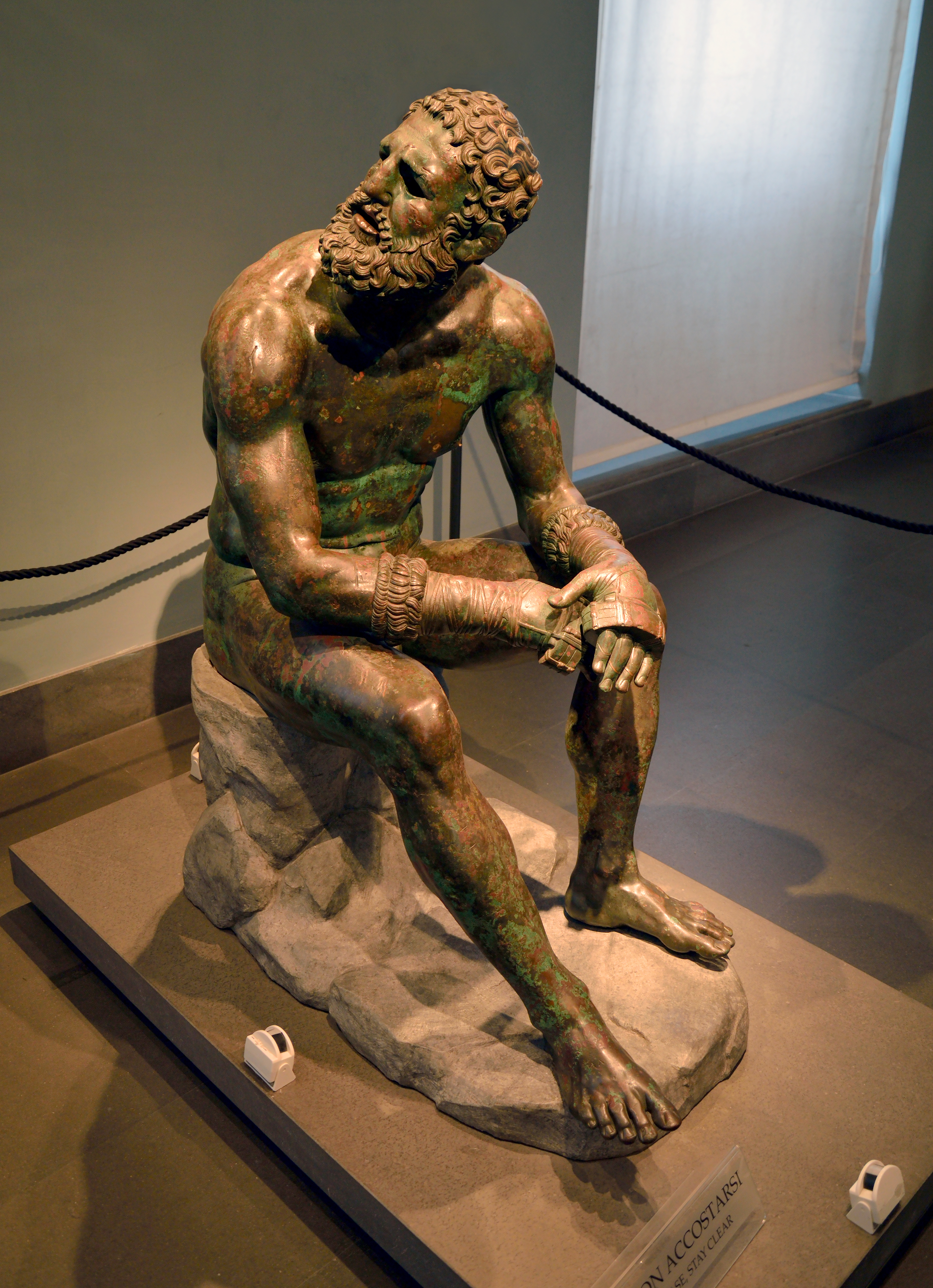
Boxer of Quirinal (Mys from Taranto) - Lateral View

Theagenes of Thasos (Greek: Θεαγένης ὁ Θάσιος) was an Olympian of ancient Greece, famous for his victories.

== Athletics ==
Son of Timosthenes, Theagenes was renowned for his extraordinary strength and swiftness. Aged nine, he supposedly carried home the bronze statue of a god he took a liking to from the agora, then carried it back again. The popular story among the Thasians was that Heracles was his father.

As he grew up he became distinguished in every kind of athletic contest, and gained numerous victories at the Olympian, Pythian, Nemean, and Isthmian Games. Altogether he was said to have won 1400 crowns at various Greek festivals. He gained a victory at Olympia in the 75th Olympiad in boxing in 480 BC, defeating Euthymos. He also competed in the same Olympics in pankration, but was too tired after the boxing match. He won at pankration in the 76th Olympics. He won three times in boxing at the Pythian Games, nine times in boxing and once in pankration at the Isthmian Games, and nine times in boxing at the Nemean Games. He also won the long distance race at Argos. Thomas Green claims that in the course of winning 1,406 boxing matches, Theagenes killed "most of his opponents".

== Statue and hero-cult ==
Pausanias relates a story regarding a statue of Theagenes made by Glaucias of Aegina. A man in Thasos had a grudge against Theagenes for his victories and scourged the statue by way of revenge. One night, the statue fell upon the man, killing him. The statue was put on trial for murder, found guilty, and exiled by being thrown into the sea. The land then became barren. The Oracle of Delphi declared that the country would remain so until they restored the statue of Theagenes. The crew of a fishing vessel caught the statue in a net and brought it to shore so it could be returned to its original site.

Pausanias mentions having seen many statues of Theagenes among both the Greeks and the Barbarians, (vi. 11. § 9.). The statue in Thasos became the focus of a hero cult and was said to have healing properties.

In The Parliament of the Gods, Lucian has Momus complain about the growing number of figures receiving divine honours, mentioning that Theagenes's statue at Thasos was believed to cure people. He compares this with Polydamas of Skotoussa, whose statue in Olympia was likewise associated with miraculous healing powers.

== Legacy ==
The football club of the island, founded in 1969, bears his name (A.O. Theagenes Thasou, Α.Ο. Θεαγένης Θάσου) and its emblem represents the head of Theagenes. The Boxer at Rest sculpture may be a depiction of him.

== In modern fiction ==
- The Olympian: A Tale of Ancient Hellas by E.S. Kraay, ISBN 1439201676
- The Pugilist at Rest: stories by Thom Jones, ISBN 0-316-47302-2
- In the 2011 film Warrior (Dir. Gavin O'Connor) Tom Hardy’s character of Tommy Conlon is said to have tried to surpass Theagenes’ record of fighting victories.
