= Glaucias =

Glaucias or Glaukias is a masculine given name which may refer to:

- Glaucias of Aegina, 5th century BC sculptor
- Glaucias (physician, 4th century BC), physician of Hephaestion during his final illness (the latter dying in 324 BC)
- Glaucias of Macedon (fl. 309), general of Alexander the Great
- Glaucias of Taulantii, Illyrian king who revolted against Alexander the Great (4th century BC)
- Glaucias (physician, 3rd century BC), Greek physician of the Empiric school who wrote commentaries on Hippocrates
- Glaucias of Athens, 1st century AD rhetorician

== See also ==
- Glaucus (disambiguation)
