= Ancient Greek boxing =

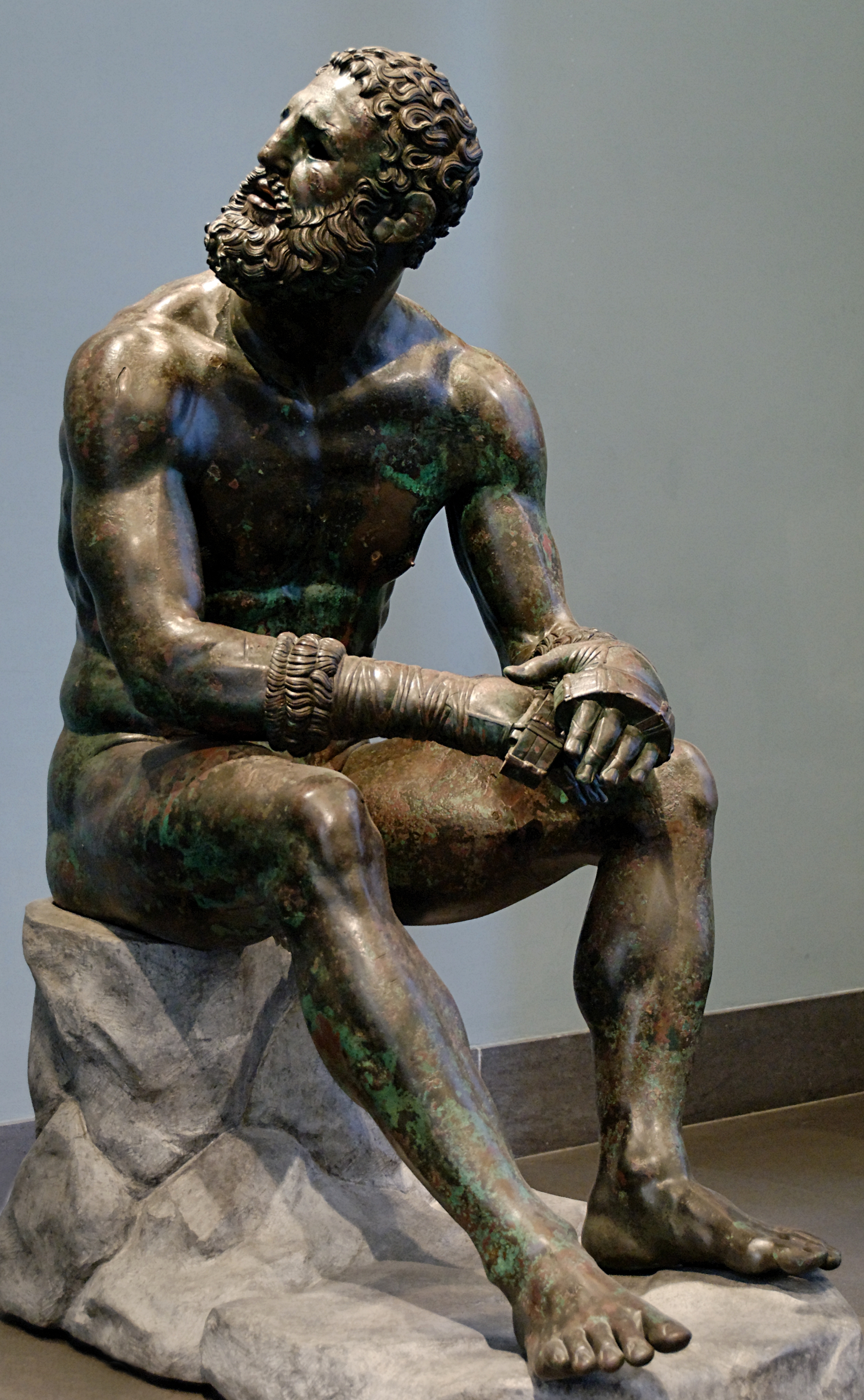
- Boxer at Rest bronze sculpture, dated variously from 300 to 50 BC
- Also known as: Ancient Olympic boxing
- Focus: Striking
- Hardness: Full contact
- Country of origin: Greece
- Descendant arts: Boxing
- Olympic sport: Ancient

Ancient Greek boxing (Greek: πυγμαχία pygmachia, "fist fighting") dates back to at least the 8th century BC (Homer's Iliad), and was practiced in a variety of social contexts in different Greek city-states. Most extant sources about ancient Greek boxing are fragmentary or legendary, making it difficult to reconstruct the rules, customs and history surrounding this activity in great detail. Still, it is clear that gloved boxing bouts were a significant part of ancient Greek athletic culture throughout the early classical period.

== Origins ==
There is archeological and artistic evidence of ancient Greek boxing (πύξ - pyx or πυγμή - pygme in Αncient Greek) as early as the Minoan and Mycenaean periods. There are numerous legends about the origins of boxing in Greece. One legend holds that the heroic ruler Theseus invented a form of boxing in which two men sat face to face and beat each other with their fists until one of them was killed. In time, the boxers began to fight while standing and wearing gloves (with spikes) and wrappings on their arms below the elbows, but otherwise they fought naked.

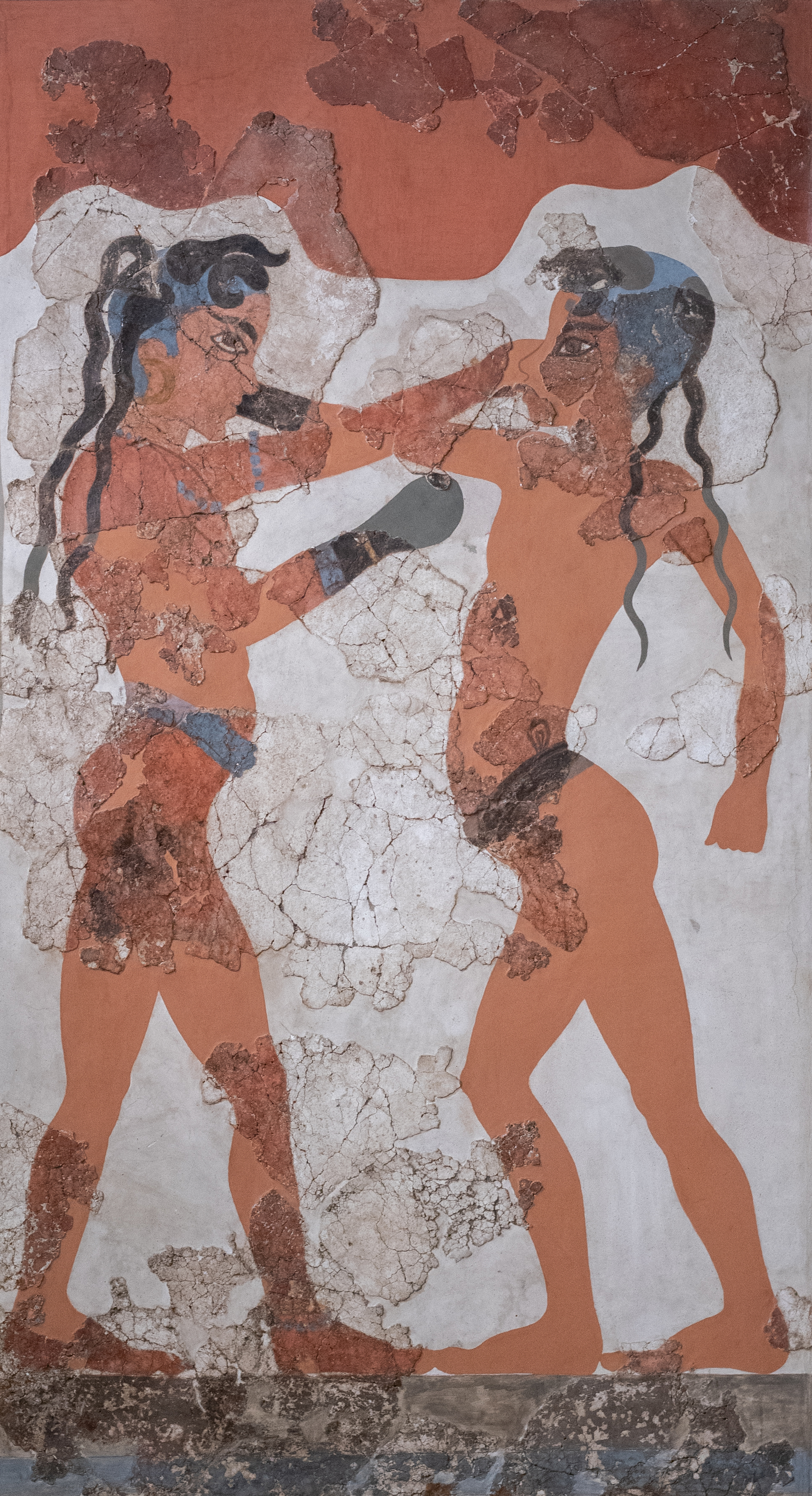
This wall painting (called the "Akrotiri Boxer fresco") depicts Minoan youths boxing ca. 1500 BC, the earliest evidence for the use of gloves

According to the Iliad, Mycenaean warriors included boxing among their competitions honoring the fallen, though it is possible that the Homeric epics reflect later Greek culture. Boxing was among the contests held in memorial of Achilles' slain friend Patroclus, toward the end of the Trojan War. It was in commemoration of Patroclus that the Greeks later introduced boxing (pygme / pygmachia) to the Olympic Games in 688 BC. Participants trained on punching bags (called a korykos). Fighters wore leather straps (called himantes) over their hands (leaving the fingers free), wrists, and sometimes breast, to protect themselves from injury. There was no protection for the face or head, meaning Greek boxing was quite dangerous compared to modern day boxing. Women were prohibited to watch games, especially boxing.

The scholar and historian Philostratus maintained that boxing was originally developed in Sparta. The early Spartans believed helmets were unnecessary and boxing prepared them for the inevitable blows to the head they would receive in battle. However, Spartans never participated in the competitive aspect of boxing, believing the means of defeat to be dishonorable.

Further archaeological evidence appears in the Bronze Age Akrotiri fresco known as the "Boxing Boys," which depicts two Minoan youths dueling with belts and boxing gloves. The fresco has been interpreted as evidence of ritualistic athletic competition and early combat sport in the Aegean world.

== Equipment ==
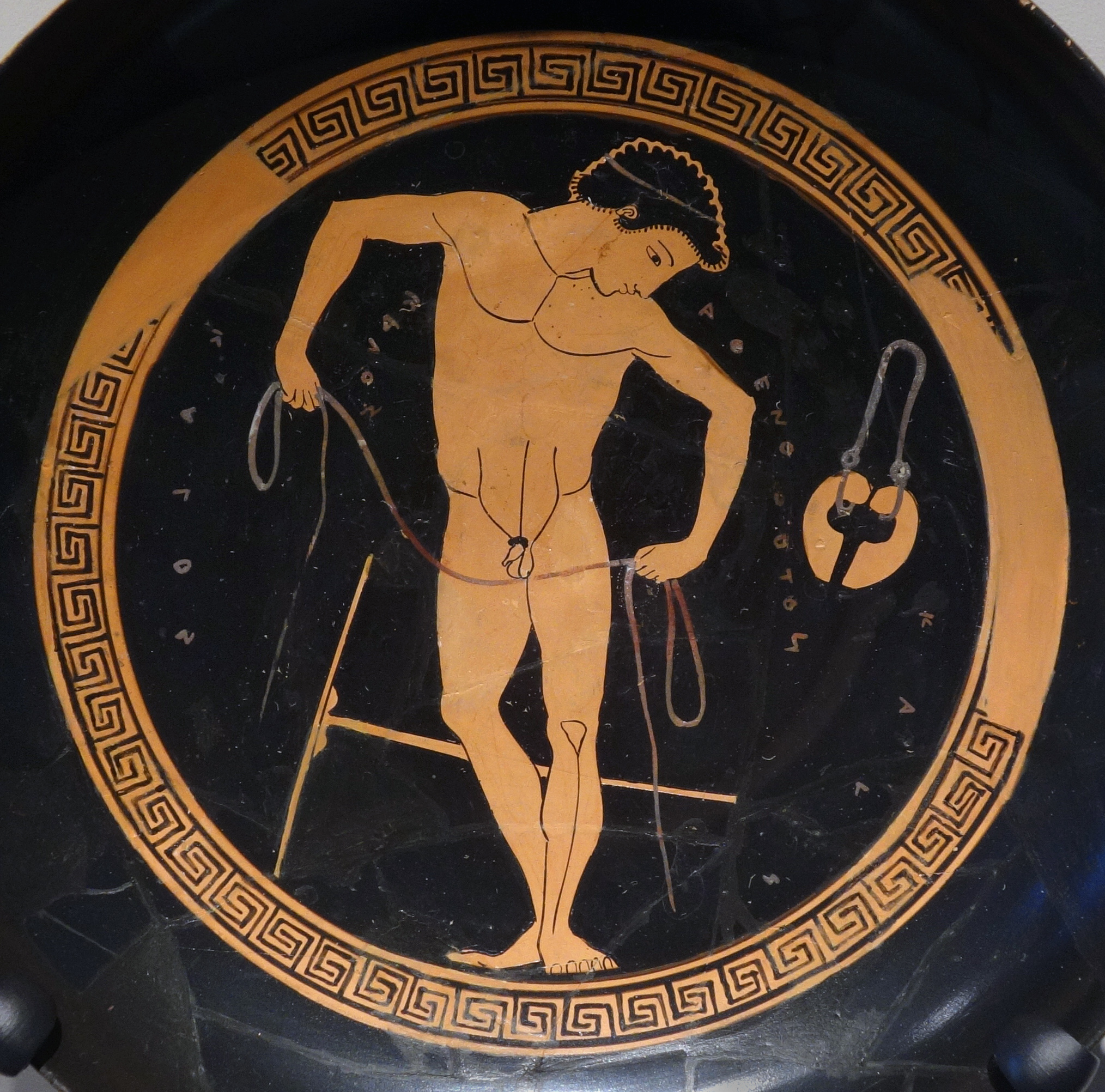
Young boxer binding his hands in leather strips, amid palaestra equipment (tondo of a kylix, late 6th–early 5th century BC)

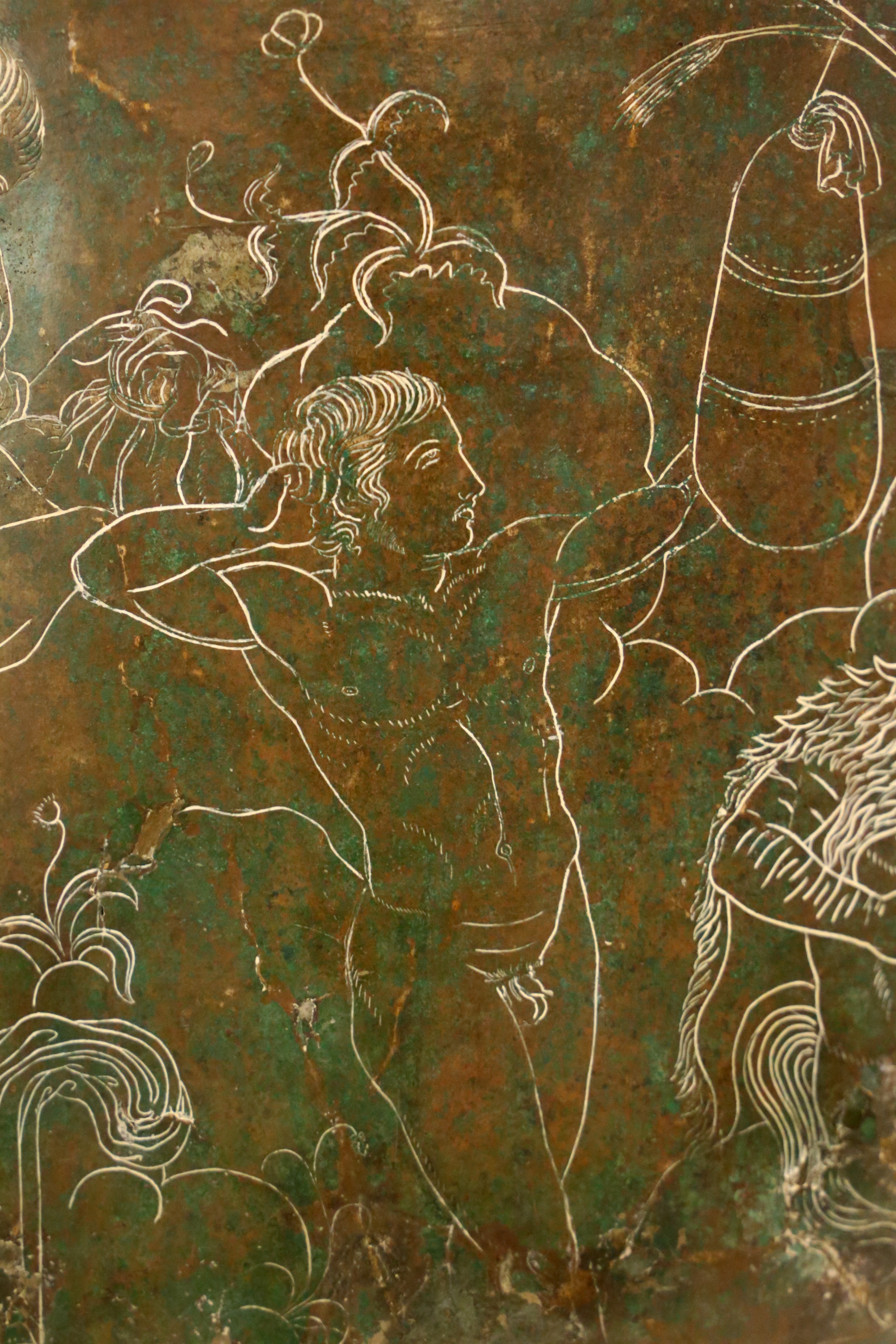
The mythological boxer Pollux using a punching bag, detail from an Etruscan cista, 340–330 BC

The style of protection utilized on the hands and knuckles could determine the style of fighting for the competitors. From the time of the Iliad until around 500 BC, himantes were used as protection for the knuckles and hand. They were thongs of ox hide approximately 3.0–3.7 m (9.8–12.1 ft) long that were wrapped around the hands and knuckles numerous times. The thongs usually had loops in which an athlete could insert four of his fingers and clench them together in a fist. Generally, this was the only form of protection worn by participants from the era of Homer until the end of the fifth century. Classical sources describe these as "soft gloves", though modern study has indicated that these thongs were far from soft and were protection for the knuckles, not to soften the blow to the opponent, much like modern padded gloves, which protect the hand, allowing for harder punches. They can be found on many vases excavated from the fifth and sixth century BC.

In around 400 BC sphairai were introduced. The sphairai were very similar to himantes. The only notable difference was that they contained a padded interior when wrapped around the hands and the exterior of the thong was notably more rigid and hard. In addition, "sharp thongs" were introduced during this time period to facilitate greater damage and remained popular up until around 200 AD.

Soon before the implementation of the sphairai, the oxys were introduced to boxing. They consisted of several thick leather bands encircling the hand, wrist, and forearm. A band of fleece was placed on the forearm to wipe away sweat. Leather braces extended up the forearm to give greater support when punching and the knuckles were reinforced with leather as well.

Korykos were the equivalent to modern punching bags. They were used for practice in the Palaestra and were filled with sand, flour, or millet. They were commonly depicted in art depicting boxing of the time.

== Rules and characteristics ==
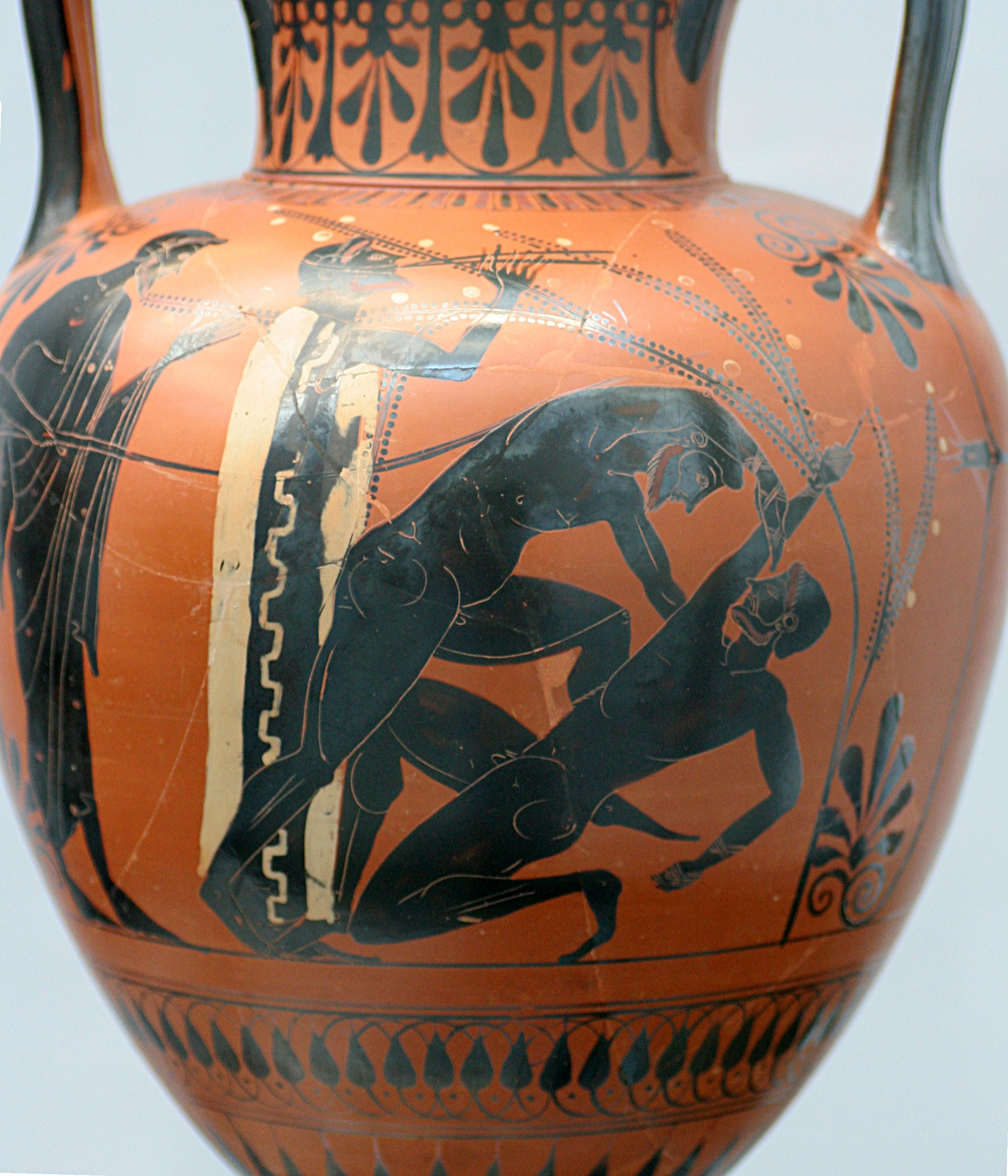
The right boxer signals giving up by raising his finger high (ca. 500 BC).

The currently accepted rules of ancient Greek boxing are based on historical references and images. Although there is some evidence of kicks in ancient Greek boxing, this is the subject of debate among scholars. Because of the few intact sources and references to the sport, the rules can only be inferred.

- No holds or wrestling
- Any type of blow with the hand was allowed but no gouging with the fingers
- No ring was used
- There were no rounds or time limits
- Victory was decided when one fighter gave up or was incapacitated
- No weight-classes, opponents were selected by chance
- Judges enforced the rules by beating offenders with a switch or whip
- Fighters wore leather hand wraps known as "himantes", reinforcing the wrists and hands with the fingers exposed. Later developments of the wraps created a more hardened weapon. Known for contributing to frequent facial injuries and disfigurement among fighters. Additionally, ancient medical and artistic evidence has directed associated boxing with mortal injuries. Injuries including fractured bones, damaged ears, and facial trauma due to the lack of facial or head protection. Due to the sport missing many of the restrictions found in modern boxing, competitors relied heavily on their own endurance and adrenaline to mask the pain during prolonged matches.
- Fighters could opt to exchange blows undefended if the fight lasted too long

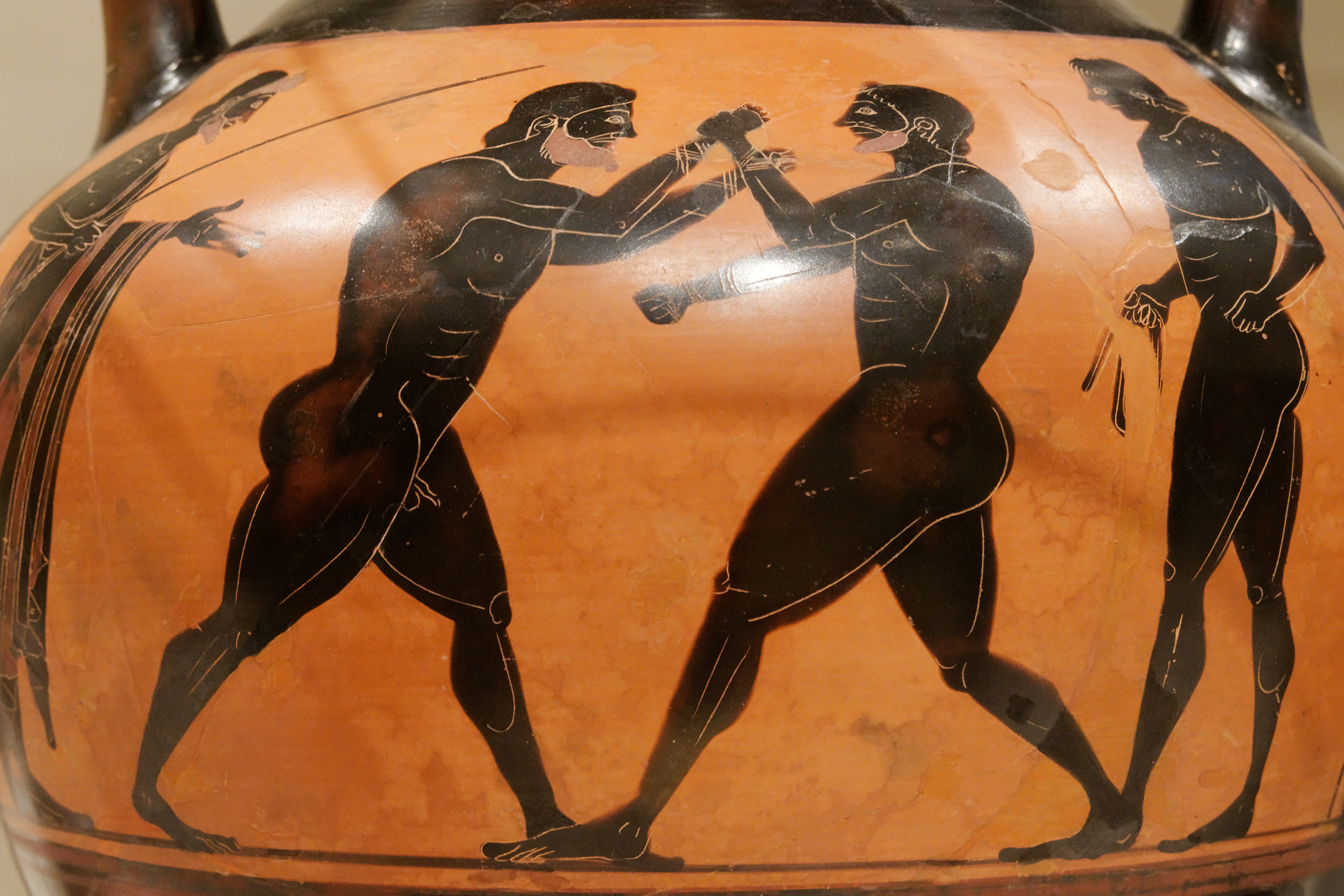
Boxers on a Panathenaic amphora (Metropolitan Museum of Art)

Unlike modern boxing, the Greeks did not enclose the competitors in a ring to encourage fighting in close quarters. Therefore, most boxers fought defensively as opposed to offensively to encourage patience and caution. In addition, boxing in ancient Greece was not divided into individual rounds. Competitors fought until finish, usually by surrender or mutual exhaustion. Felled boxers could be attacked without consequence, just as if they were standing.

The modern practice of dividing boxers into weight classes was unheard of among the Greeks. Typically, any man who wished to participate in the event was welcome to regardless of strength or muscle mass, and participants competed with each other through random drawings.

The precise rules of boxing in antiquity cannot be known for certain, and are thus inferred from historical references and images. It is believed that any type of blow with the hand was permitted, though using the hands to gouge at the eyeballs was not. Holding or wrestling one's opponent was also prohibited. If the fight lasted too long due to the tenacity of the competitors, the athletes could choose to hit each other in turn without either man defending themselves, to speed up the process of a knockout or surrender. Judges probably enforced the rules by beating the offenders with a switch or a whip.

Fighters wore leather hand wraps known as "himantes", reinforcing the wrists and hands with the fingers exposed. Later developments of the wraps created a more hardened weapon. Known for contributing to frequent facial injuries and disfigurement among fighters. Additionally, ancient medical and artistic evidence has directed associated boxing with mortal injuries. Injuries including fractured bones, damaged ears, and facial trauma due to the lack of facial or head protection. Due to the sport missing many of the restrictions found in modern boxing, competitors relied heavily on their own endurance and adrenaline to mask the pain during prolonged matches.

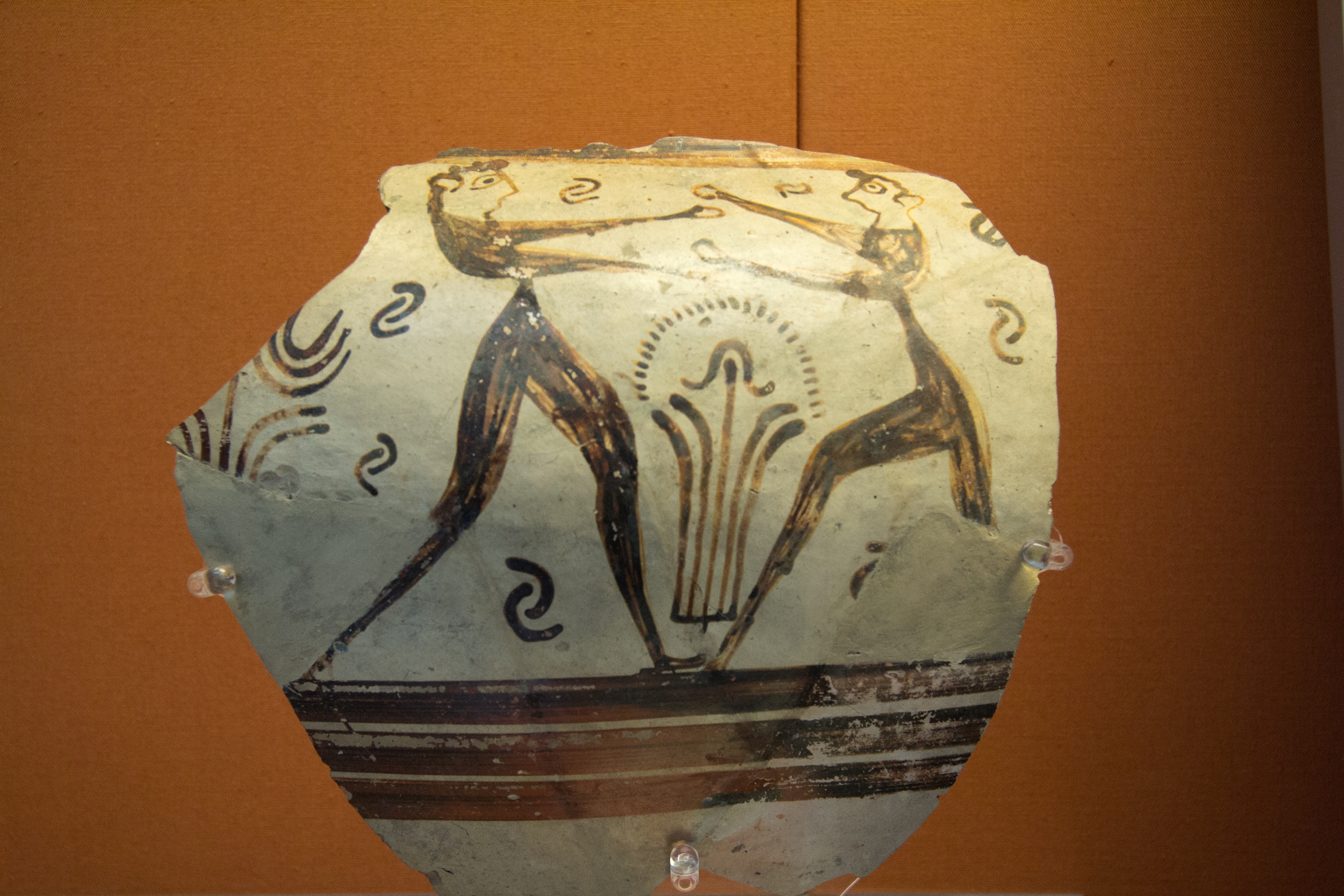
Mycenaean boxers, 1300–1250 BC, on a krater fragment

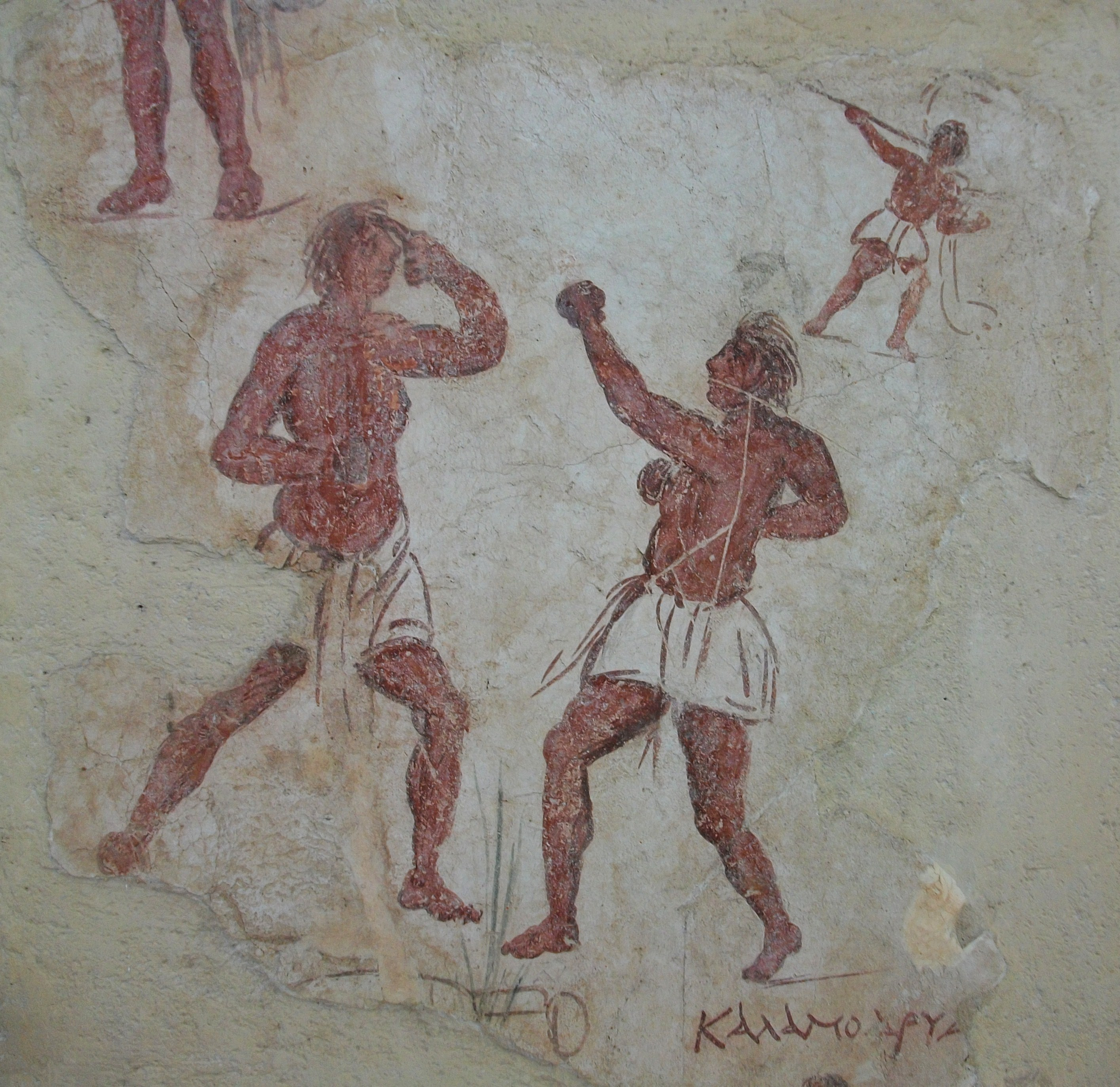
Boxing or the pankration with gloves (latter 2nd–early 1st century BC)

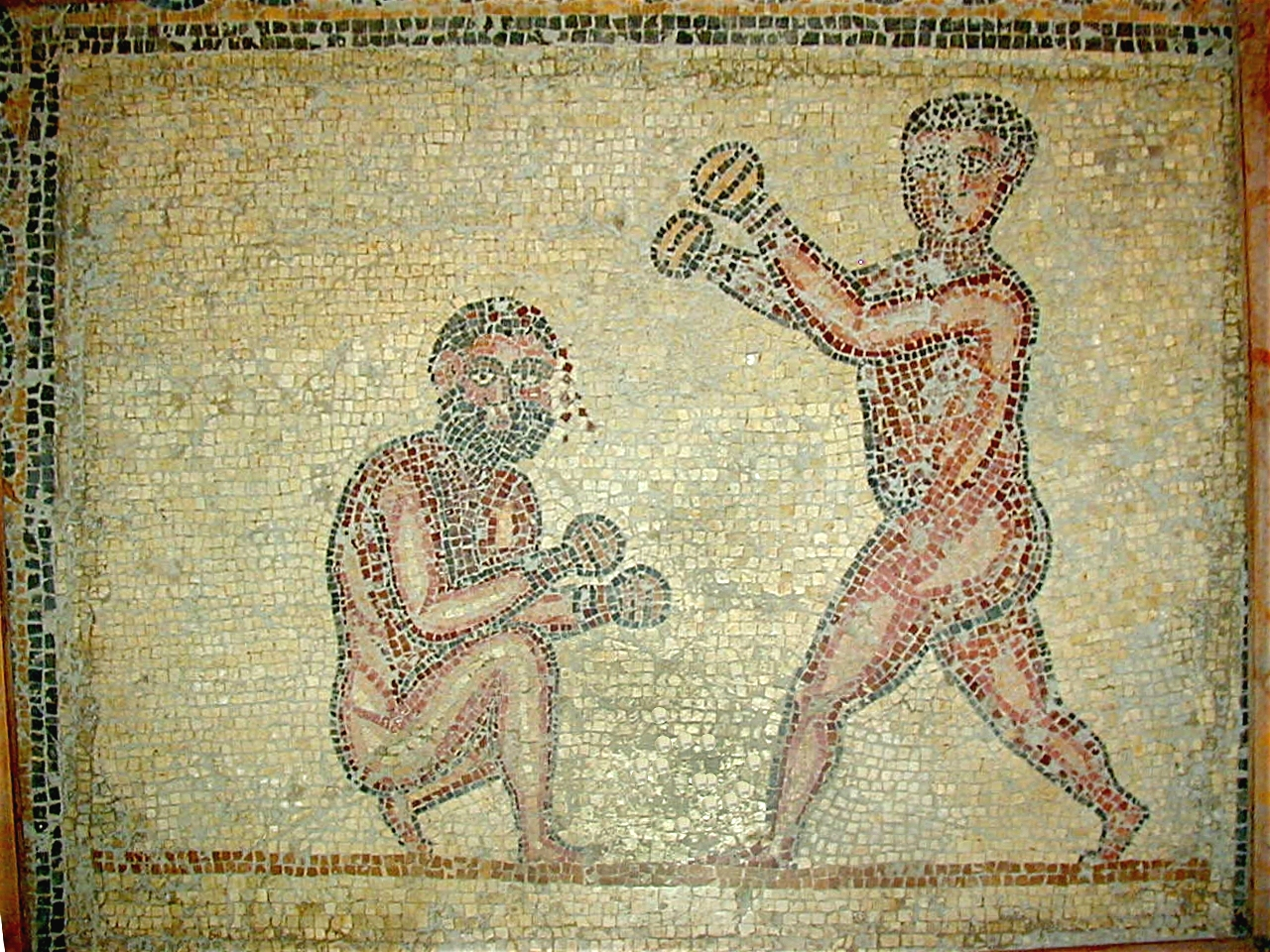
Pugilists wearing sphere-style gloves, mosaic from Roman Africa (3rd century AD)

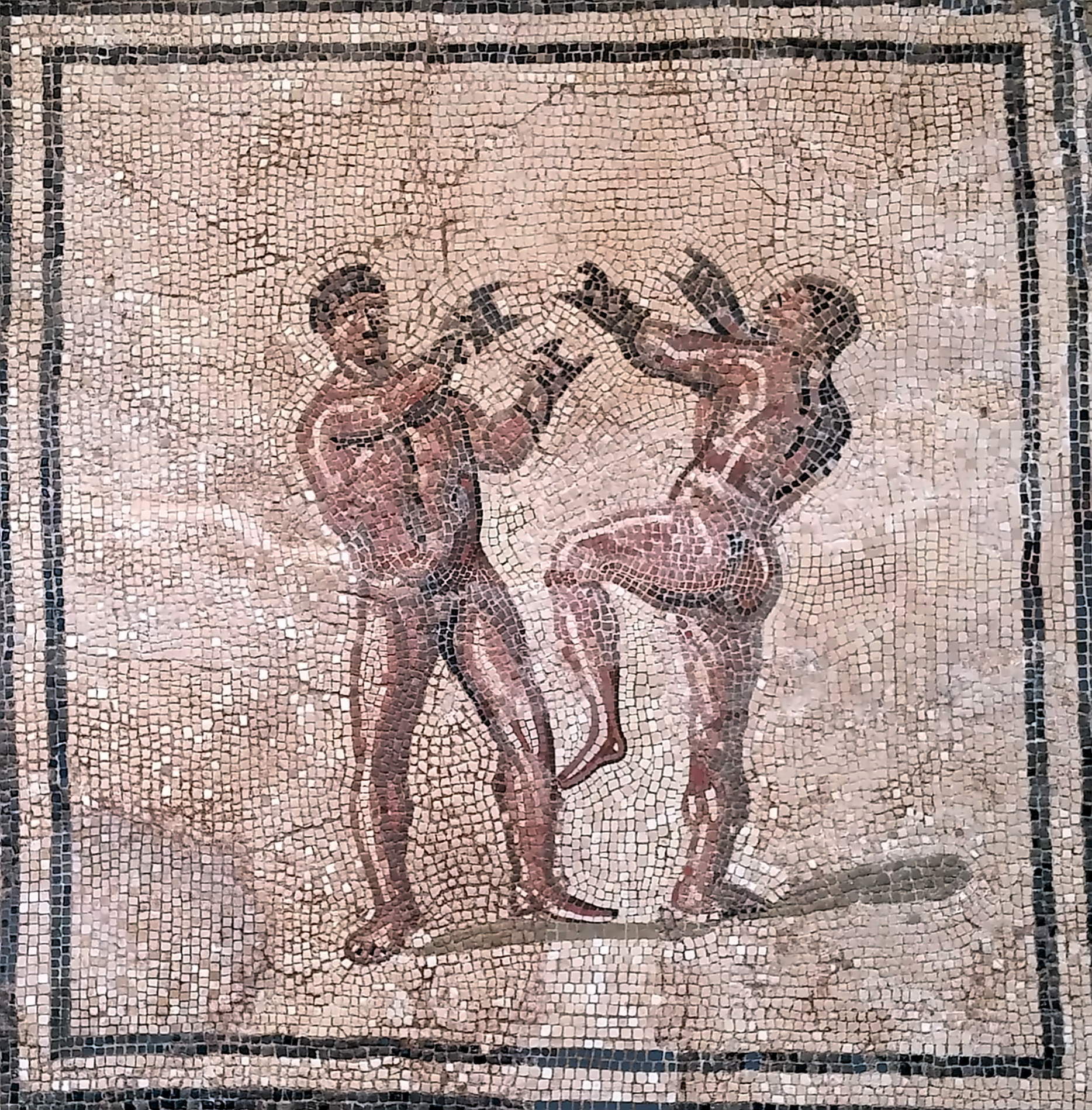
Pugilists (possibly pankratists) wearing spiky caestūs, mosaic from Roman Trier (early to mid 4th century AD)

== Role in Greek Society ==
Boxing was closely connected to physical excellence and citizenship in Ancient Greek society. Greek athletics mirrored the idea of "Kalos kagathos" which is physical with ability connected with moral virtue and social status. Participation in athletics was widely associated with traits of discipline and endurance. On top on this, the development of qualities in preparation for military duties was something that was valued among all male citizens. Athletic training was also linked to civic and military responsibility, as citizens were expected to maintain physical readiness in defense of the polis. Success within athletics also granted prestige and populatiary to both the competitor and their city-state.

After winning, successful boxers were often honored by the public through celebration and art. Usually earning commendatore statues and or painted pottery resembling their achievements. Renowned boxers were found to be cherished long after their competition, through constant public recognition and artistic depictions throughout the Greek world.

Ancient Greek society created the "palaestra", which is an ancient Greek wrestling and athletic school. Adolescents would go here for a variety of reasons, including conditioning, exercises, sparring, shadowboxing, and counterpunching.

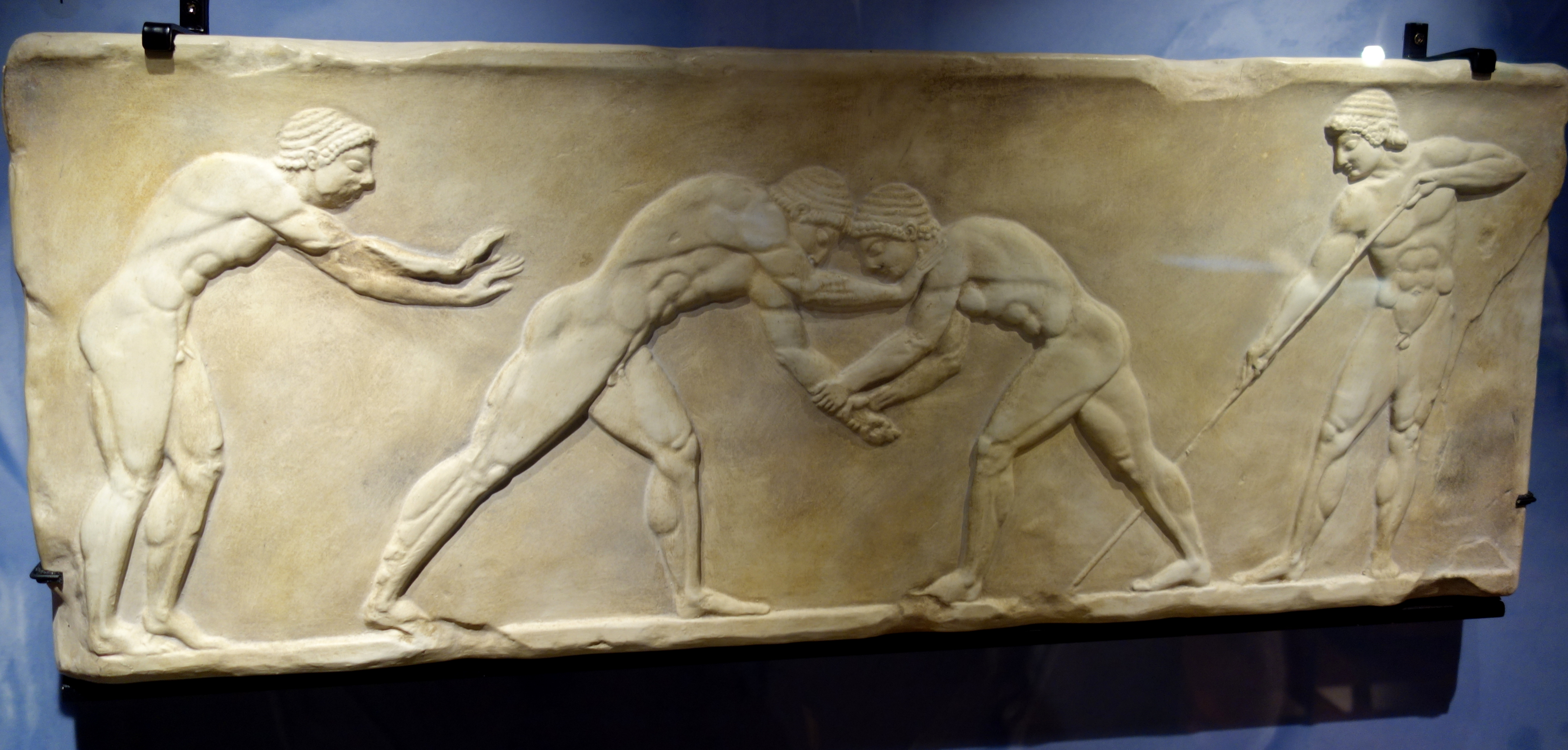
Youths training in the palaestra, from a plaster cast of a statue base from the Themistoclean Wall (Kerameikos, Athens), c. 510 BC (Teece Museum of Classical Antiquities, Christchurch, New Zealand)

These were intended to develop everything that was expecting out of a man in ancient Greek society. This included, endurance, discipline, and physical preparedness.

== Pugilatus ==
Ancient Roman boxing
- Roman boxing mosaic (Getty Villa)
- Also known as: Pugilatus
- Focus: Striking
- Hardness: Full contact
- Country of origin: Ancient Rome
- Parenthood: Greek boxing
- Descendant arts: Bare-knuckle boxing, Modern Boxing
- Olympic sport: Ancient (banned in 400 AD)

The form of boxing in the Roman Empire was called pugilatus, from pugnus, "fist" (Greek pygme). Greek influence came through the Etruscans. Boxing was a very popular sport until it was banned around 400 CE by Theodosius the Great because of its violence. Evidence for Roman boxing comes from ancient literature, sculpture, wall paintings, and mosaic.

Techniques and rulesets were similar to Greek boxing:

- weight classes were absent;
- there was no time limit;
- the boxer could hit his opponent even if he was on the floor;
- the use of kicks in both forms is still debated.

The following actions were violations:

- gouging the eyes;
- hitting the opponent below;
- biting the opponent.

The main difference between them were the gloves used: instead of the oxys, the Romans used the caestus, gloves made with metal knuckles, that required sheepskin reinforcement that wrapped all the way up the shoulder. Several depictions of caesti show them armed with spikes or blades.

Another main difference was the fighting position, in which the boxer stood upwards instead of bending himself.

The match ending was also changed, as tap outs weren't allowed in the beginning, but submissions were later added for safety measures. One of the reasons pugilatus was later banned was its brutality, as matches often ended with the death of one competitor. Boxers also suffered serious injuries, including bruises, concussions, brain damage, internal hemorrhages and broken bones.

== Ancient Olympic champions ==
- Diagoras of Rhodes
- Theagenes of Thasos
- Kleitomachos (athlete)
- Melankomas
- Varazdat of Armenia
- Onomastus of Smyrna
- Agesarchus of Tritaea
- Pythagoras (boxer)
- Glaucus of Carystus
- Aurelios Zopyros
- Damarchus
- Atyanas
- Horus (athlete)
- Theotimus, an Eleian boxer. A statue at Olympia was made to honour him. His father, Moschion, accompanied Alexander the Great in his campaign to Asia.
- Varazdat

== See also ==
- Pankration
- Boxing glove
- Modern boxing
- Boxing
- History of physical training and fitness
