= Glaucous =

Pale grey or bluish-green appearance of the surfaces of some plants

Color coordinates
- Hex triplet: #6082B6
- sRGB^{B} (r, g, b): (96, 130, 182)
- HSV (h, s, v): (216°, 47%, 71%)
- CIELCh_{uv} (L, C, h): (54, 51, 250°)
- Source: ISCC-NBS
- ISCC–NBS descriptor: Moderate blue
- B: Normalized to [0–255] (byte)

Glaucous (from Latin glaucus, from Ancient Greek γλαυκός (glaukós) 'blue-green, blue-grey') is used to describe the pale grey or bluish-green appearance of the surfaces of some plants, as well as in the names of birds, such as the glaucous gull (Larus hyperboreus), glaucous-winged gull (Larus glaucescens), glaucous macaw (Anodorhynchus glaucus), and glaucous tanager (Thraupis glaucocolpa).

The term glaucous is also used botanically as an adjective to mean "covered with a greyish, bluish, or whitish waxy coating or bloom that is easily rubbed off" (e.g. glaucous leaves).

The first recorded use of glaucous to refer to color was in the year 1671.

== Examples ==
=== Botany ===
The epicuticular wax coating on mature plum fruit gives them a glaucous appearance. Another familiar example is found in the common grape genus (Vitis vinifera). Some cacti have a glaucous coating on their stem(s). Glaucous coatings are hydrophobic so as to prevent wetting by rain. Their waxy character serves to hinder climbing of leaves, stem or fruit by insects. On fruits, glaucous coatings may function as a deterrent to climbing and feeding by small insects in favor of increased seed dispersal offered by larger animals such as mammals and birds.

=== Zoology ===
The blue-grey camouflage coloring of some species of birds and sea and land animals causes their appearance to blend with their surroundings, making their detection by predators or prey difficult.

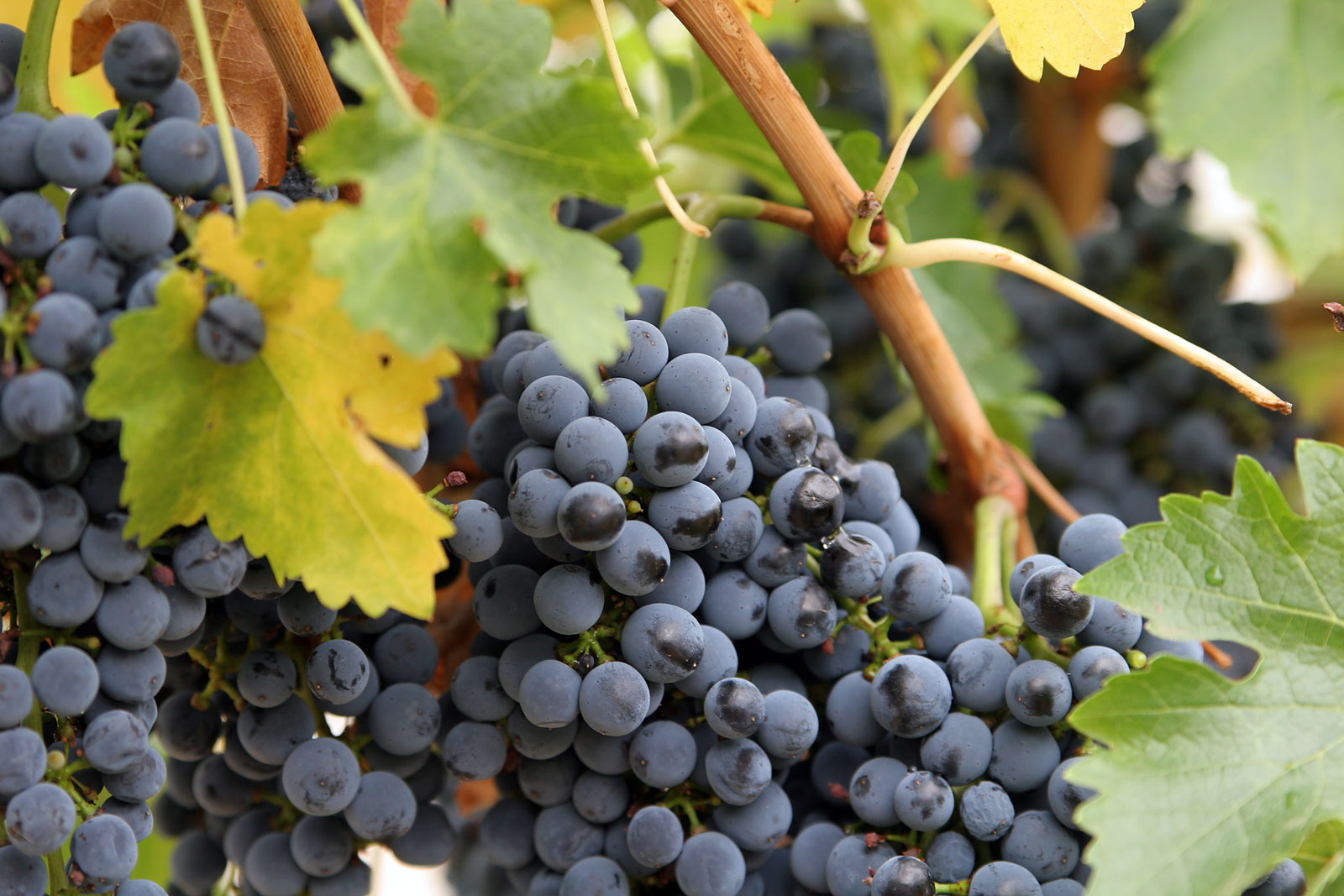
Wine grapes with glaucous coating

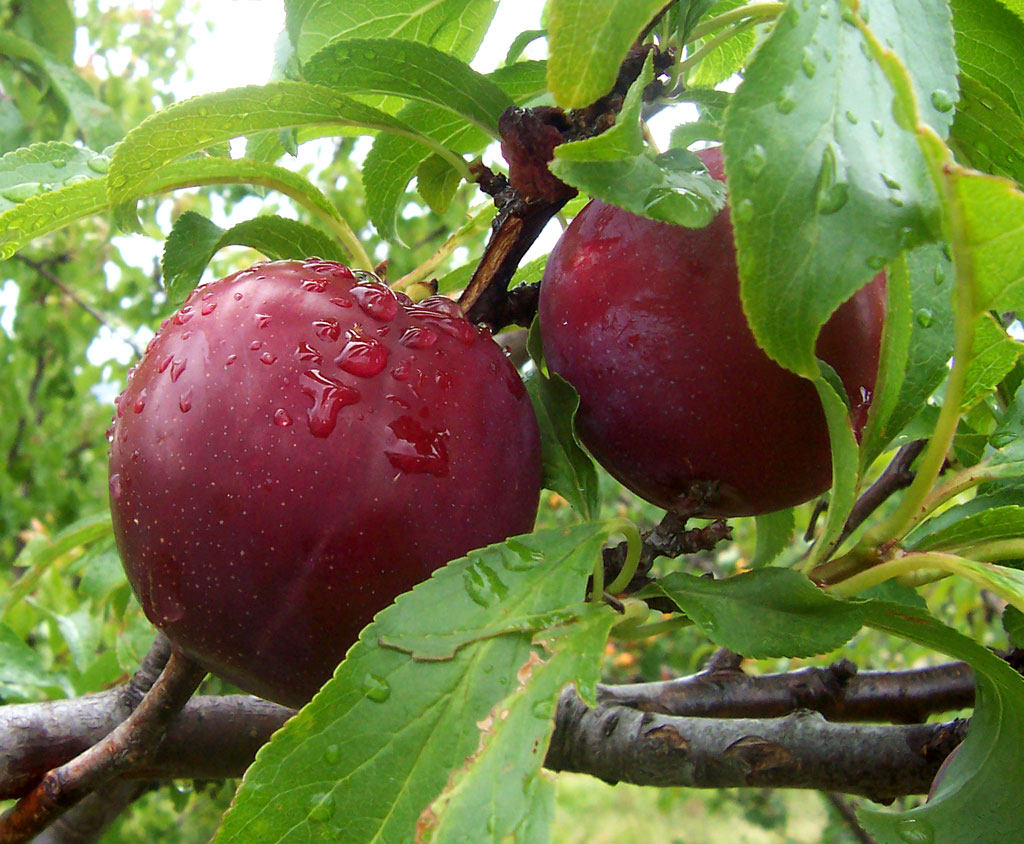
Plums with some glaucous coating visible

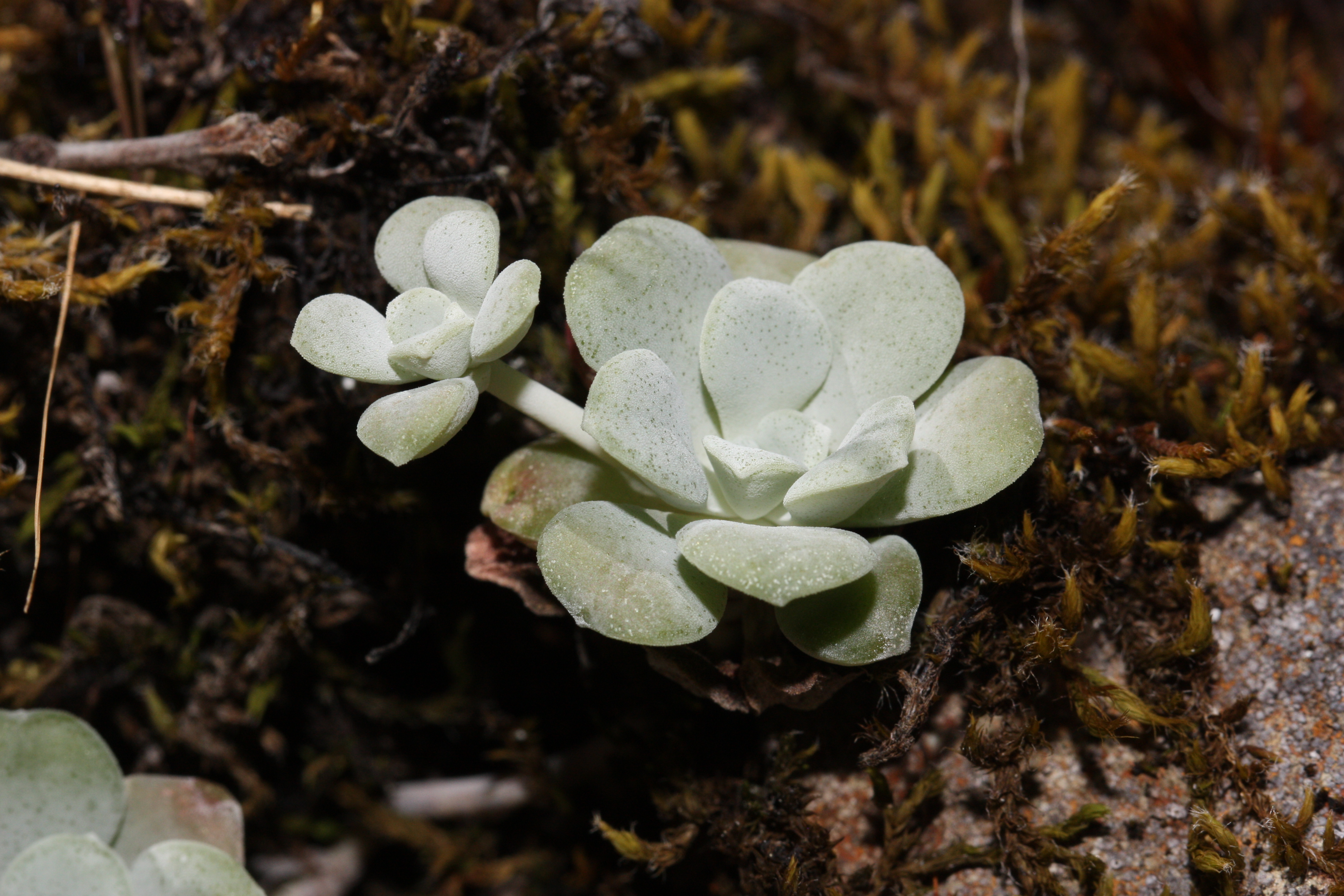
Sedum spathulifolium is a glaucous perennial herbaceous plant.

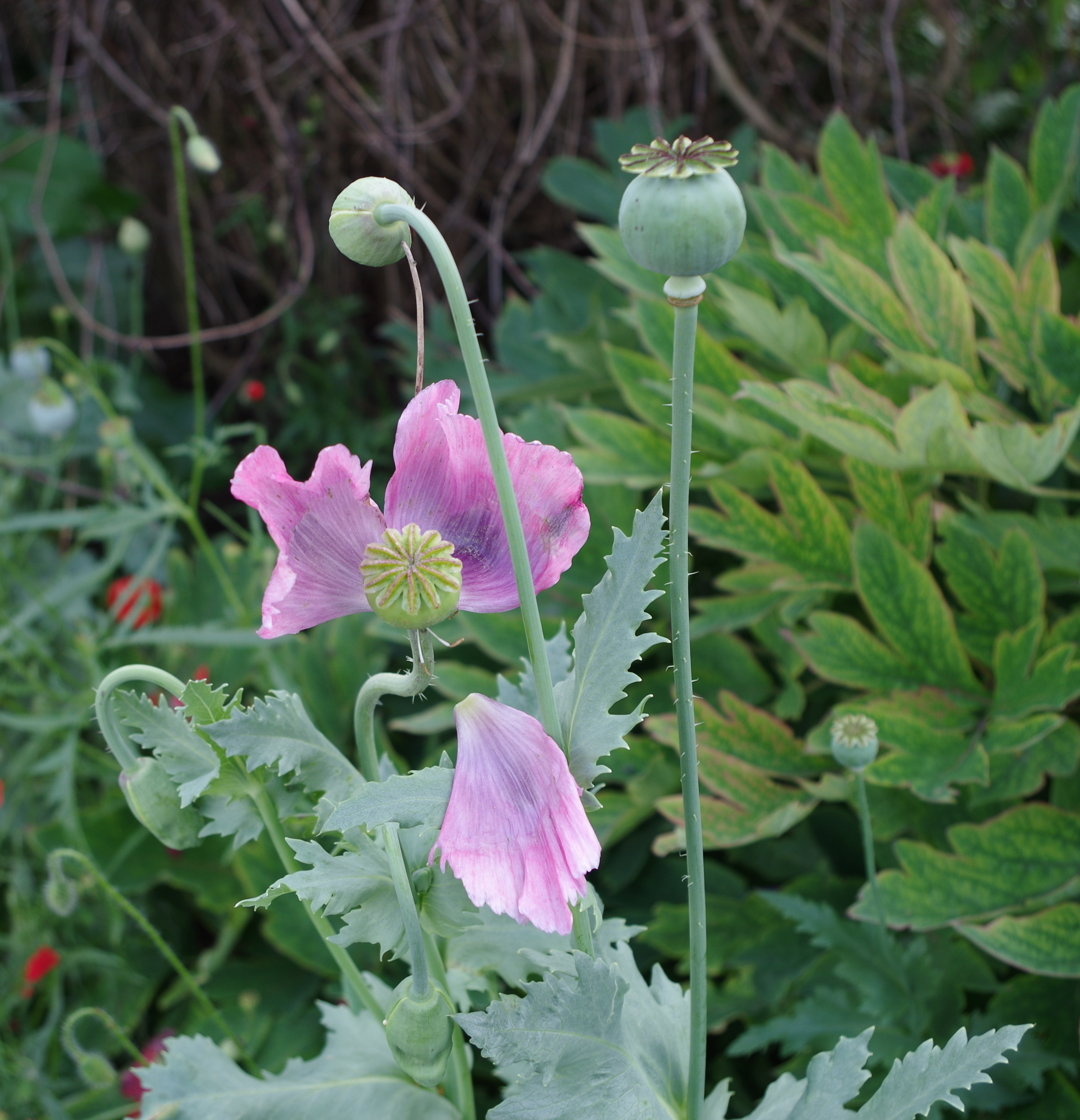
The glaucous leaves and seed pods of Papaver somniferum

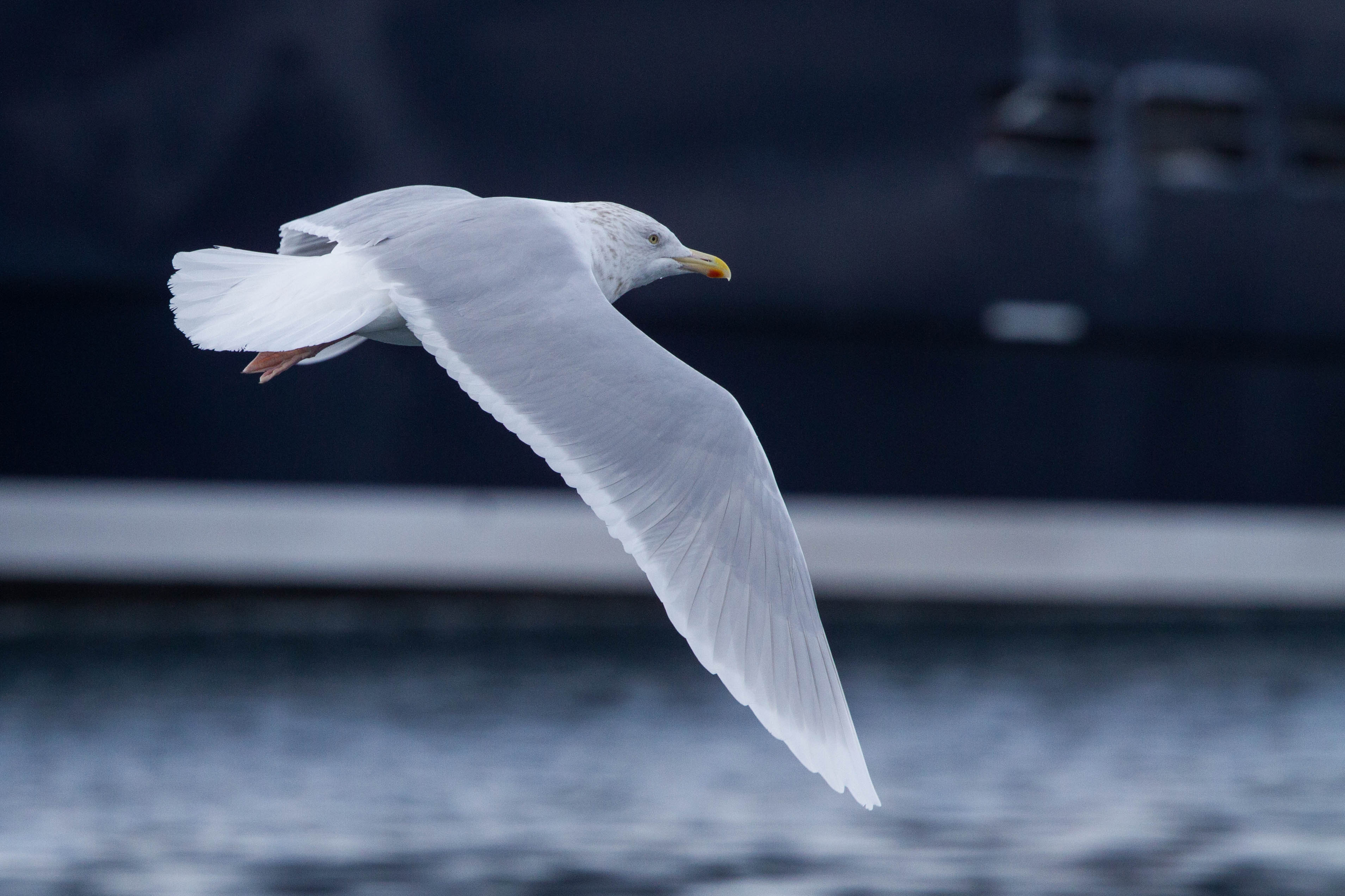
Glaucous gull (Larus hyperboreus)

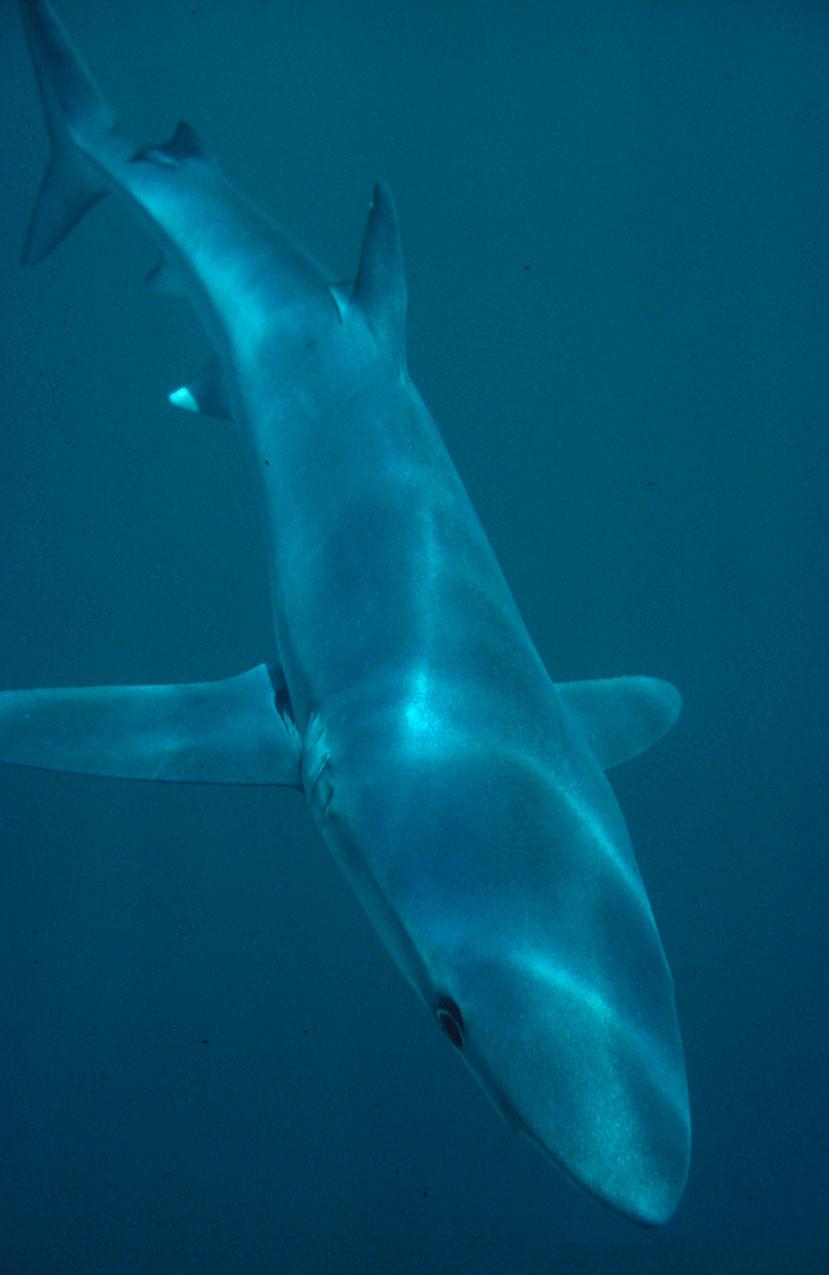
Blue shark (Prionace glauca)

=== Medicine ===
Glaucoma (a group of eye diseases) is named after the color glaucous since it describes the bluish-green or gray appearance of the pupil, especially in severe cases

== See also ==
- Lists of colors
- Glaucus (disambiguation)
