= Apollonius Glaucus =

(Apollonius Glaucus)
- Born: 1st or 2nd century CE
- Occupations: physician, writer

Apollonius Glaucus (Greek: Ἀπολλώνιος Γλαῦκος) was a physician and writer who must have lived during or before the 2nd century CE, as his work On Internal Diseases is quoted by Caelius Aurelianus. Nothing more is known of his life. He wrote, for instance, on the significance of the types of excreted worms.

== Name ==
The name Glaucus comes from Greek mythology, including one sea-god.
