= Onomastus of Smyrna =

Ancient Greek boxer

Onomastus of Smyrna (Greek: Ὀνόμαστος) was the first Olympic victor in boxing at the 23rd Olympiad, 688 BC, when this sport was added. According to Philostratus, Pausanias and Eusebius, Onomastus was not only the first Olympic boxing champion but he wrote the rules of Ancient Greek boxing as well. Pausanias adds that Smyrna was already then part of Ionia. (Onomastos means famous, literally "having a name, onoma").
