= Glaucus (disambiguation) =

In Greek mythology, Glaucus was a Greek prophetic sea-god.

Glaucus, often transliterated to Glafkos, may also refer to:

== People ==
- Glaucus, son of Aepytus of Messenia
- Glaucus (son of Sisyphus), of Potniae
- Glaucus (son of Minos), of Crete
- Glaucus (son of Hippolochus), of Lycia, grandson of the hero Bellerophon
- Glaucus of Carystus, an ancient Greek athlete
- Glaucus of Chios (c. 7th century BCE), Greek sculptor in metal
- Apollonius Glaucus, 2nd-century Roman physician
- Glafcos Clerides (1919–2013), former President of Cyprus

== Rivers ==
- Glafkos (river), a river in Patras, Greece
- Glaucus (river of Asia Minor), rivers in Asia Minor

== Ships ==
- Greek submarine Glafkos (Υ-6), a Protefs-class submarine of the Hellenic Navy
- SS Glaucus (1871), shipwrecked in 1921
- USS Glaucus (1863), a steamship of the Union Navy during the American Civil War

== Other ==
- 1870 Glaukos, a Trojan asteroid
- Glaucus (gastropod), a genus of nudibranchs in the family Glaucidae
- Glaucus (mythology), characters named Glaucus in Greek mythology
- Glaucus (sculpture), a sculpture by the French artist Auguste Rodin
- The protagonist in the 1834 novel The Last Days of Pompeii by Edward Bulwer-Lytton
- Glaukos Linea, a linea on Europa
- Glaucus Sinus, now Gulf of Fethiye in Turkey
- Project Glaucus, an underwater habitat in Plymouth Sound

== See also ==
- Glaucias (disambiguation)
- Glaucous
- Glauce
- Glaucia
