= Momoeria =

January 30, 2011: Revival of the Momoeroi in Komotini.

The festival of the Momoeroi, the Momoeria is a Pontic Greek folk festival that takes place in the twelve days between Christmas, New Year's, and Epiphany. A related custom is the Ragoutsaria of Drama, Kozani, and Kastoria. The festival has its roots in pre-Christian traditions celebrating Momus, the ancient Greek god of satyr and pranks. Since 2016 the Momoeria is protected as part of the UNESCO Intangible Cultural Heritage Lists.
