= Atyanas =

Ancient Greek boxer

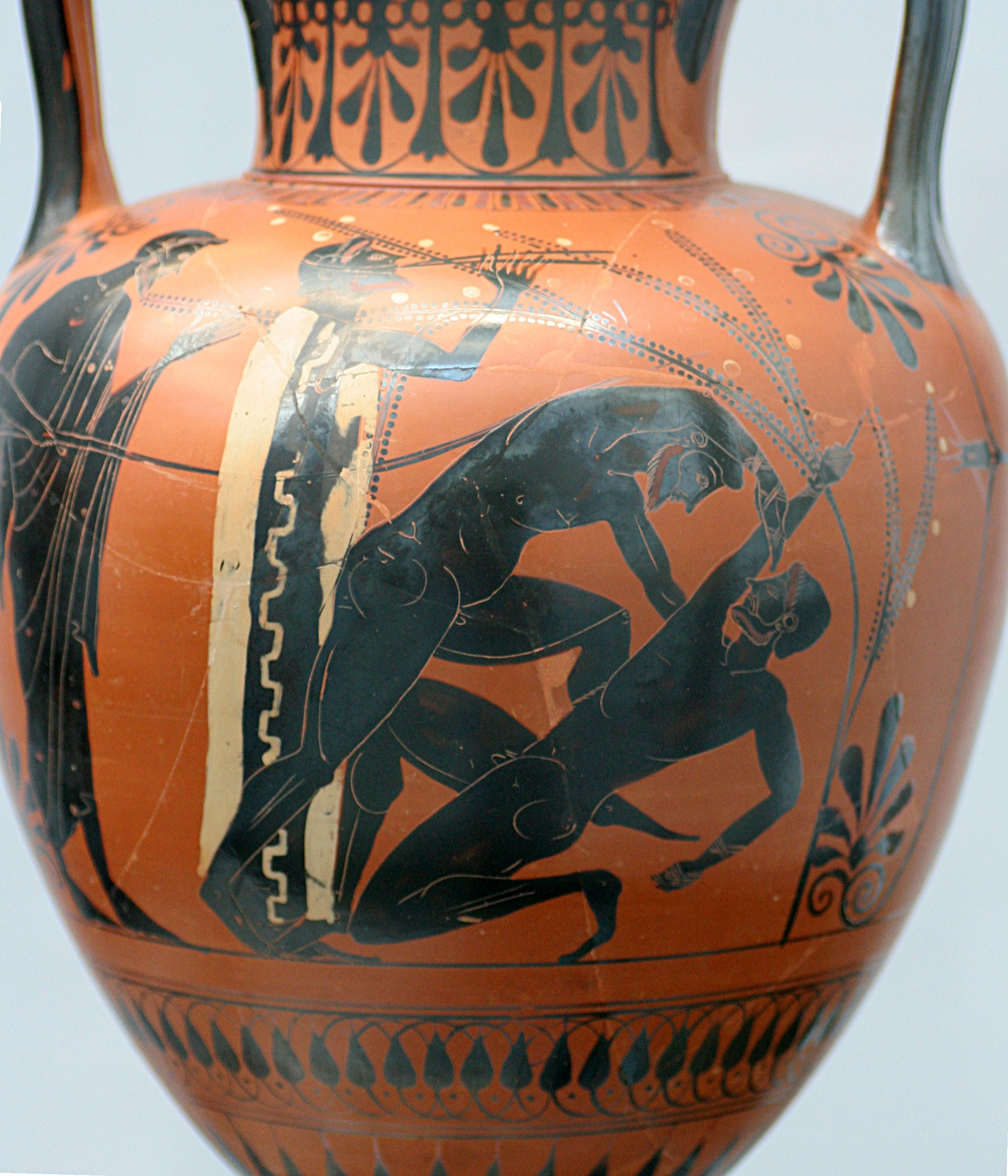
Boxing on an Attic vase, ca. 510–500 BC

Atyanas (Ancient Greek: Ἀτυάνας; d. 62 BC) was a nobleman and an Olympic victor at boxing from Adramyttium in Mysia. His father's name was Hippocrates.

Atyanas won the boxing competition in 72 BC and is listed in Phlegon's summary of the 177th Olympiad. Phlegon's Olympiad chronicle was summarized by the 9th-century Byzantine scholar Photios, who provides the one for the 177th Olympiad.

Cicero says that he was killed by pirates while L. Valerius Flaccus was governor of Asia.
