= Caelius Aurelianus =

5th-century Greco-Roman physician and writer

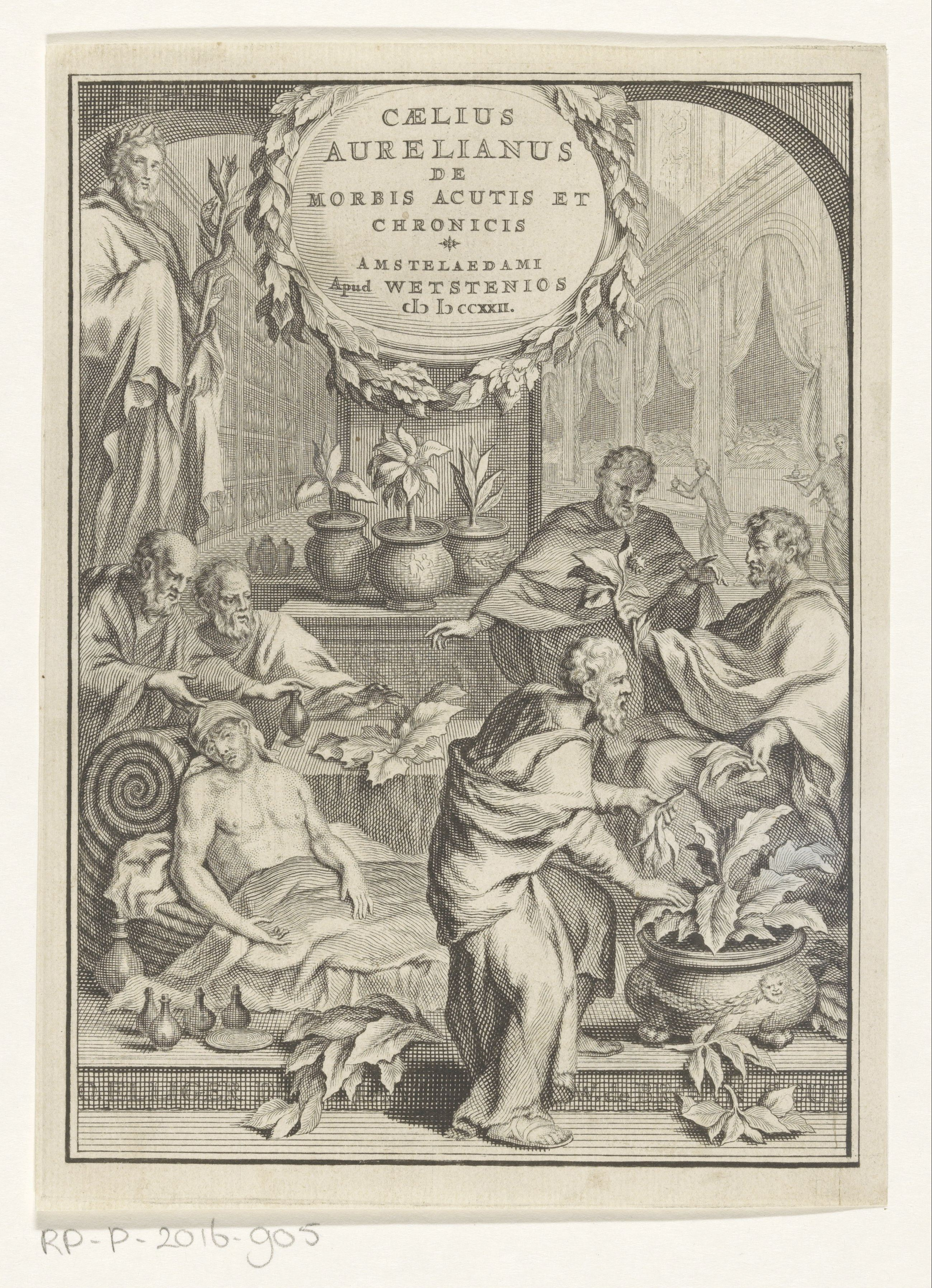
Caelius Aurelianus, De morbis acutis et chronicis, Amsterdam, Wetstein, Rudolph & Gerard, 1722.

Caelius Aurelianus of Sicca in Numidia was a Greco-Roman physician and writer on medical topics. He is best known for his translation from Greek to Latin of a work by Soranus of Ephesus, On Acute and Chronic Diseases. He probably flourished in the 5th century, although some place him two or even three centuries earlier. In favour of the later date is the nature of his Latin, which shows a strong tendency to the Romance, and the similarity of his language to that of Cassius Felix, also an African medical writer, who about 450 wrote a short treatise, chiefly based on Galen.

We possess a translation by Aurelianus of two works of Soranus of Ephesus (2nd century), the chief representative of the methodic school of medicine, on chronic and acute maladies—Tardae or Chronicae Passiones, in five, and Celeres or Acutae Passiones in three books. The translation, which is especially valuable since the original has been lost, shows that Soranus possessed considerable practical skill in the diagnosis of both ordinary and exceptional diseases. It is also important in that it contains numerous references to the methods of earlier medical authorities.

We also possess considerable fragments of his Medicinales Responsiones, also adapted from Soranus, a general treatise on medicine in the form of questions and answers; it deals with rules of health (salutaria praecepta) and the pathology of internal diseases (ed. Rose, Anecdota Graeca et Latina, ii., 1870). Where it is possible to compare Aurelianus's translation with the original—as in a fragment of his Gynaecia with Soranus's Περὶ γυναικείων παθῶν—it is found that it is literal, but abridged. There is apparently no manuscript of the treatises in existence.

In his texts, Aurelianus writes about the 2nd century Greek physician Apollonius Glaucus, author of several works on internal diseases. Aurelianus quotes a passage on the subject of earthworms.
