= Melankomas =

Ancient Greek boxer

Personal information
- Native name: Μελανκόμας
- Nationality: Ancient Greek
- Born: Caria (modern-day Turkey)
- Died: ~70 A.D. Naples, Italy

Sport
- Sport: Ancient Greek Boxing
Medal record
Ancient Greek Olympics
Gold medal – first place	49 A.D. Olympia	Boxing

Melankomas, or Melancomas (Greek: Μελανκόμας or Μελαγκόμας), meaning 'One with the Black Hair,' was an Ancient Greek boxer from Caria and victor in the 207th Olympiad (49 AD.).

== Biography ==
Melankomas was born in Caria to an Ancient Greek boxing champion, of the same name, who lived during the first century C.E. He made a name for himself as an Ancient Greek boxer in the Olympiad, even winning in the 207th Olympiad in 49 A.D.

Supposedly he had a unique boxing style, blocking and avoiding the punches of the other boxer without throwing any himself. Ancient Greek boxing rules specified that only blows were permitted, and matches had no time limits or points, simply lasting until one boxer surrendered. Thus, once his opponents had run out of stamina and could no longer attack nor defend themselves, they would have to forfeit, leaving Melankomas the victor.

It was related by Dio Chrysostom that he was able to fight like this by training significantly more than his contemporaries and having an unmatched endurance, being able to fight through a whole day or hold his arms up, in a static hold, continuously for two days.

Melankomas died young, around the year 70 A.D. during the games in Naples.

== Legacy ==
Melankomas is known to us mainly from the 28th and 29th Discourses of Dio Chrysostom, in which that writer uses his life as a canvas for a discussion of the ideal athlete and the ideal man; Dio praises his athleticism, good looks, and brave heart. Dio says he never lost a match, hit an opponent, or was struck by an opponent. Themistius reports that the emperor Titus was his lover (erastes).

Some scholars believe Melankomas to have been a real person, while others believe that he or his record was an invention of Dio's; there is nothing allowing a firm conclusion either way.

Melankomas was mentioned in a second-season episode of Sports Night as a contender for "Athlete of the Millennium."

He appears as an opponent in the Cestarii expansion of the mobile game Gladiator Manager.
