= Glaucias of Aegina =

Glaucias was a sculptor of Aegina, who made the bronze chariot and statue of Gelon. Gelon was the son of Deinomenes and a ruler and tyrant of Syracuse and Gela. The sculptures commemorated his victory in the chariot race at Olympia, 488 BC.

The following bronze statues of athletes at Olympia were also by Glaucias: Philon of Corcyra, Glaucus of Carystus, and Theagenes of Thasos, who conquered Euthymus in boxing in 480 BC (Paus. vi. 6. § 2).
