= Glaucias of Athens =

Glaucias (Γλαυκίας) was a rhetorician of Athens, who appears to have lived in the 1st century CE, mentioned only by Plutarch (Sympos. i. 10, 3, ii. 2).
