= Momus =

Personification of satire and mockery in Greek mythology

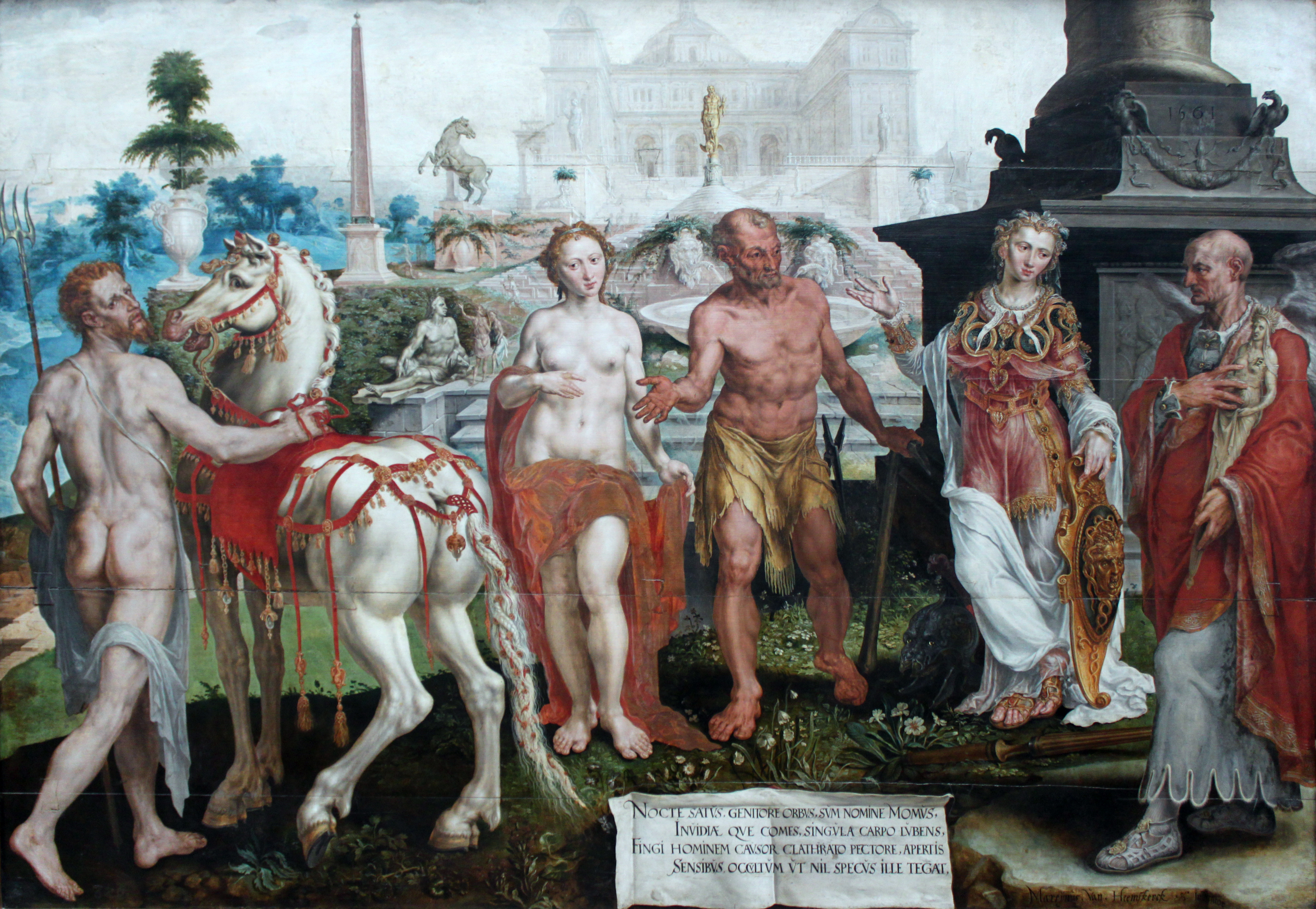
Momus Criticizes the Gods' Creations, by Maarten van Heemskerck, 1561, Gemäldegalerie, Berlin

Momus (/ˈmoʊməs/; Ancient Greek: Μῶμος Momos) in Greek mythology was the personification of satire and mockery, two stories about whom figure among Aesop's Fables. During the Renaissance, several literary works used him as a mouthpiece for their criticism of tyranny, while others later made him a critic of contemporary society. Onstage he finally became the figure of harmless fun. Today, celebrations of Momus survive in the Momoeria New Year's festivals of Northern Greece.

== In classical literature ==
As a sharp-tongued spirit of unfair criticism, Momus was eventually expelled from the company of the gods on Mount Olympus. His name is related to μομφή, meaning 'blame', 'reproach', or 'disgrace'. One scholar translated the name as Cavil. Hesiod said that Momus was a son of Night (Nyx), "though she lay with none", and the twin of the misery goddess Oizys. In the 8th-century BCE epic Cypria, Momus was credited with stirring up the Trojan War after Gaia had asked Zeus to reduce the human population. Sophocles wrote a later satyr play called Momos, now almost entirely lost, which may have derived from this.

Two of Aesop's fables feature the god. The most widely reported of these in Classical times is numbered 100 in the Perry Index. There Momus is asked to judge the handiwork of three gods (who vary depending on the version): a man, a house and a bull. He found all at fault: the man because his heart was not on view to judge his thoughts; the house because it had no wheels so as to avoid troublesome neighbours; and the bull because it did not have eyes in its horns to guide it when charging. Because of it, Plutarch and Aristotle criticized Aesop's story-telling as deficient in understanding, while Lucian insisted that anyone with sense was able to sound out a man's thoughts.

As another result, Momus became a by-word for fault-finding, and the saying that if not even he could criticize something then that was the sign of its perfection. Thus a poem in the Greek Anthology remarks of statues by Praxiteles that "Momus himself will cry out, 'Father Zeus, this was perfect skill'." Looking the lovely Aphrodite over, according to a second fable of Aesop's, number 455 in the Perry Index, it was light-heartedly noted that he could not find anything about her to fault except that her sandals squeaked.

== Political satire ==
In Lucian's 2nd-century comic dialogue The Gods in Council, Momus takes a leading role in a discussion on how to purge Olympus of foreign gods and barbarian demi-gods who are lowering its heavenly tone.

Renaissance author Leon Battista Alberti wrote the political work Momus, or The Prince (1446), which continued the god's story after his exile to earth. Since his continued criticism of the gods was destabilizing the divine establishment, Jupiter bound him to a rock and had him castrated. Later, however, missing his candor, Jupiter sought out a manuscript that Momus had left behind in which was described how a land could be ruled with strictly regulated justice.

At the start of the 16th century, Erasmus also presented Momus as a champion of the legitimate criticism of authorities. Allowing that the god was "not quite as popular as others, because few people freely admit criticism, yet I dare say of the whole crowd of gods celebrated by the poets, none was more useful." Giordano Bruno's philosophical treatise The Expulsion of the Triumphant Beast (1584) also looks back to Lucian's example. Momus there plays an integral part in the series of dialogues conducted by the Olympian deities and Bruno's narrators as Jupiter seeks to purge the universe of evil.

== Social satire ==
17th-century English writers introduced the figure of Momus in a gentler spirit of fun, as in Thomas Carew's masque Coelum Britannicum (1634), which was acted before King Charles I and his court. In Coelum Britannicum, Momus and Mercury draw up a plan to reform the "Star Chamber" of Heaven. Two centuries later, Coelum Britannicum influenced Henry David Thoreau as he was preparing to write his Walden.

John Dryden's short "Secular Masque" (1700) mocks contemporary society through the medium of the Classical divinities, with Momus playing a leading part in deflating with sarcastic wit the sports represented by Diana (hunting), Mars (war), and Venus (love), for "'Tis better to laugh than to cry." It is with similar wryness that Carl Sandburg's statue of "Momus" (1914) surveys the never-changing human scene, "On men who play in terrible earnest the old, known, solemn repetitions of history", as they continue to overpopulate the world and then bleed it.

== Comedy ==
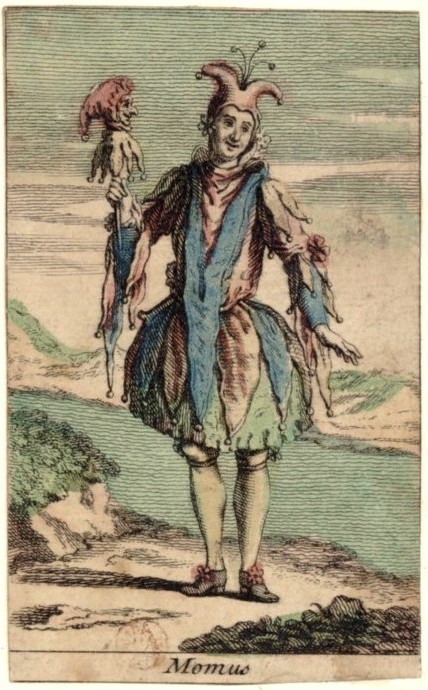
"The Fool" (Momus), on a 17th-century playing card

Elsewhere in Europe, Momus was becoming softened into a figure of light-hearted and sentimental comedy, the equivalent of Harlequin in the French and Italian Commedia dell'arte. A typical production has him competing for the amorous favours of a nymph in Henry Desmarets' opéra-ballet Les amours de Momus (1695).

By this period, Momus was the patron of humorous satire, partnering the figures of comedy and tragedy. As such he appeared flanked by these female figures on the frontispiece to The Beauties of the English Stage (1737), while in Leonard Defraine's Figures of Fabled Gods (1820), he partners Comus, god of Carnival, and Themis, patroness of assemblies. Because of the Harlequin connection, and as the character able to make home-truths palatable through the use of humour, Momus had now taken the place of the Fool on a French Minchiate card pack. He also lent his name to George Saville Carey's satirical poem, Momus, or a critical examination into the merits of the performers and comic pieces at the Theatre-Royal in the Hay-Market (1767). The god himself plays no part there, only "Momus' sons," the comic actors.
