= Glaucus of Carystus =

Ancient Greek boxer

Glaucus (Greek: Γλαύκος) of Carystus, the son of Demylos, was a boxer and one of the most celebrated Ancient Greek athletes. He was a περιοδονίκης (winner at all most important games of Ancient Greece), having gained one Olympic, two Pythian, eight Nemean, and eight Isthmian victories in boxing.

The fullest account of his life is given by Pausanias, according to whom Glaucus claimed descent from the marine god Glaucus. It is said that while still a boy, Glaucus refixed a ploughshare which had dropped out of its place by the blows of his fist, without the help of a hammer. His father, observing that, had him participate in the boxing competition at the Olympic games. Having had no previous training, Glaucus was severely injured by his opponents, and was about to pass out during the final fight, but his father encouraged him with the words "Son, the plough tough", whereupon Glaucus defeated his opponent with a final blow. He subsequently became a renowned boxer, winning all his victories. His statue at Olympia was made by Glaucias of Aegina at the request of his son. Glaucus was said to have been buried on an island which later bore his name.
