= Comparative officer ranks of World War II =

The following table shows comparative officer ranks of World War II, with the ranks of Allied powers, the major Axis powers and various other countries and co-belligerents during World War II.

== Table ==
The rank insignia of commissioned officers.

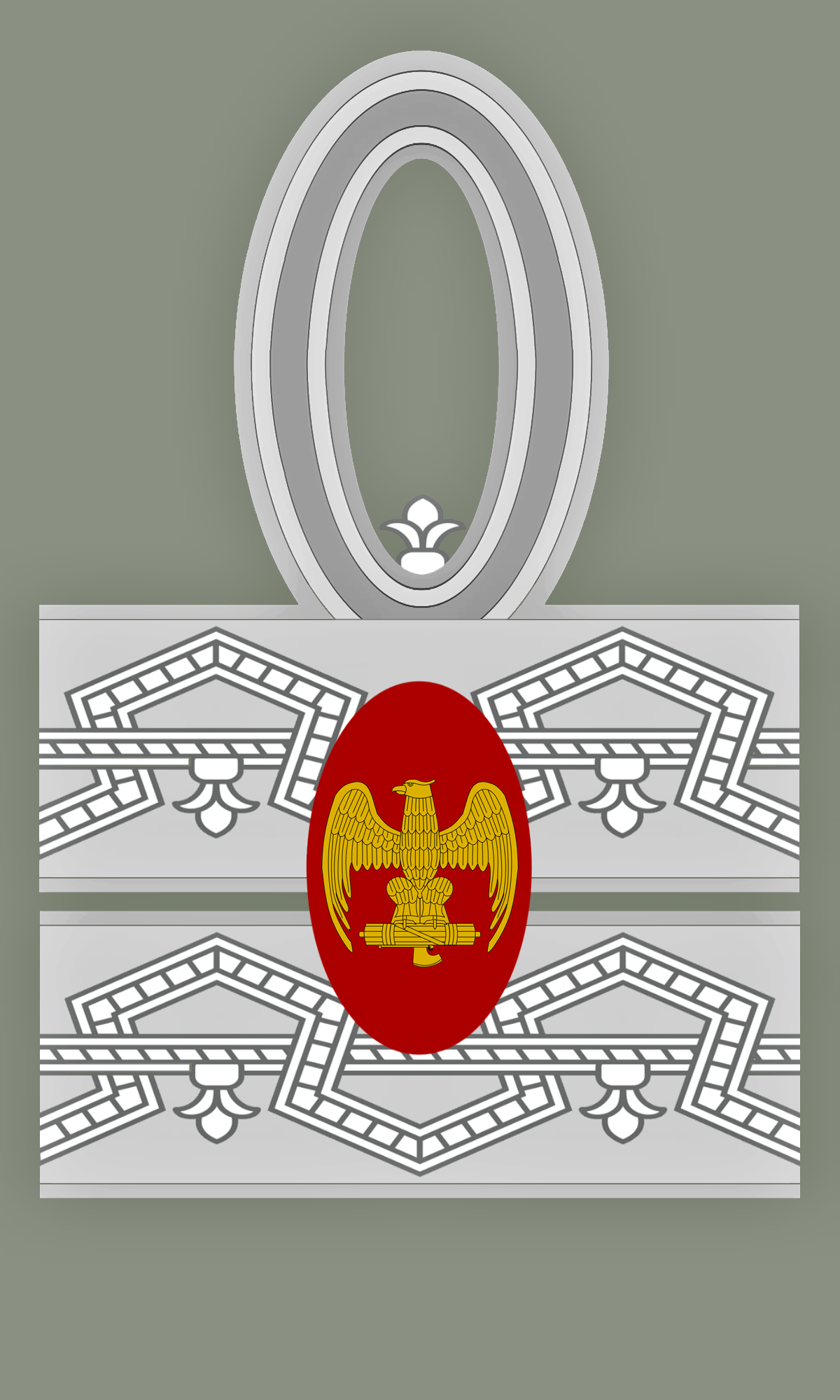
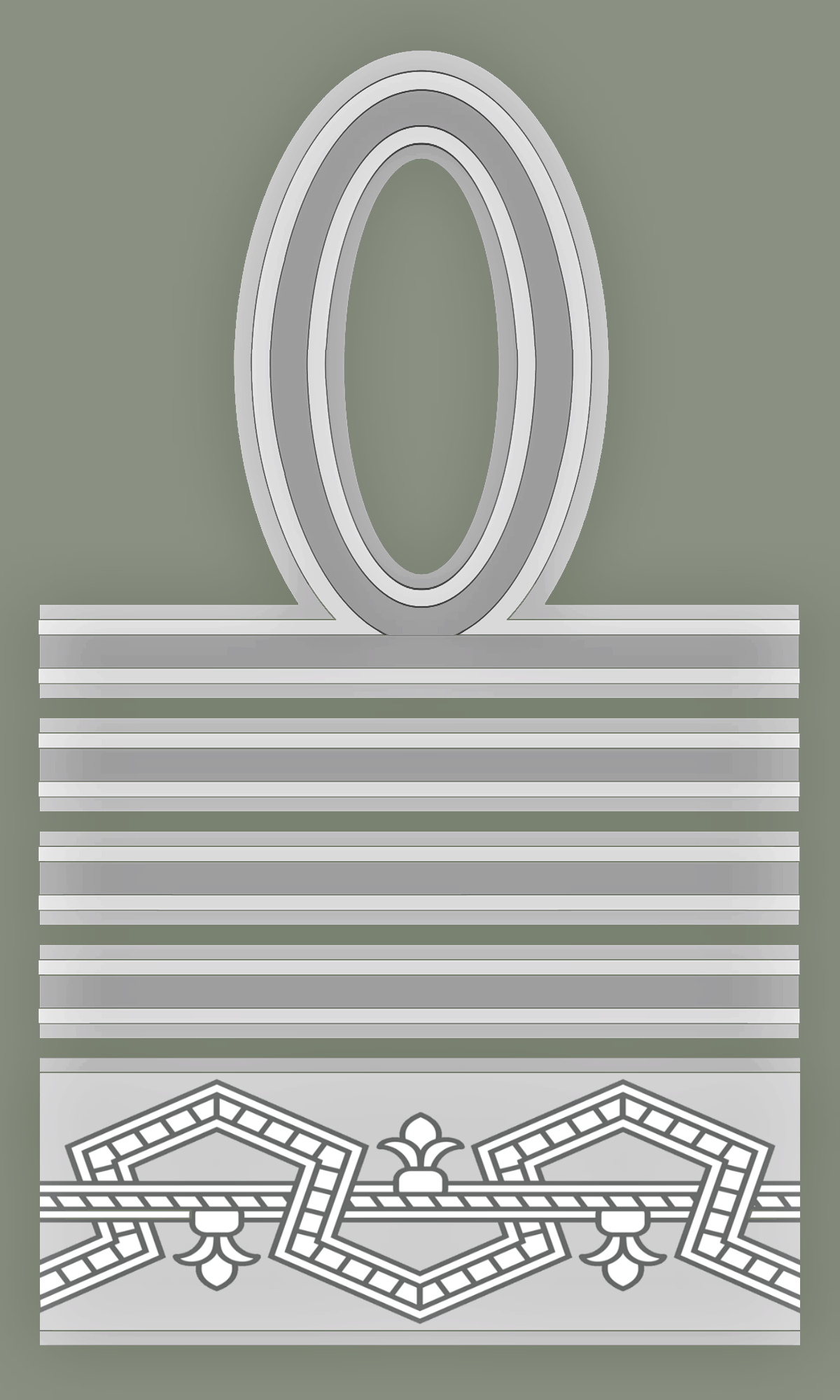
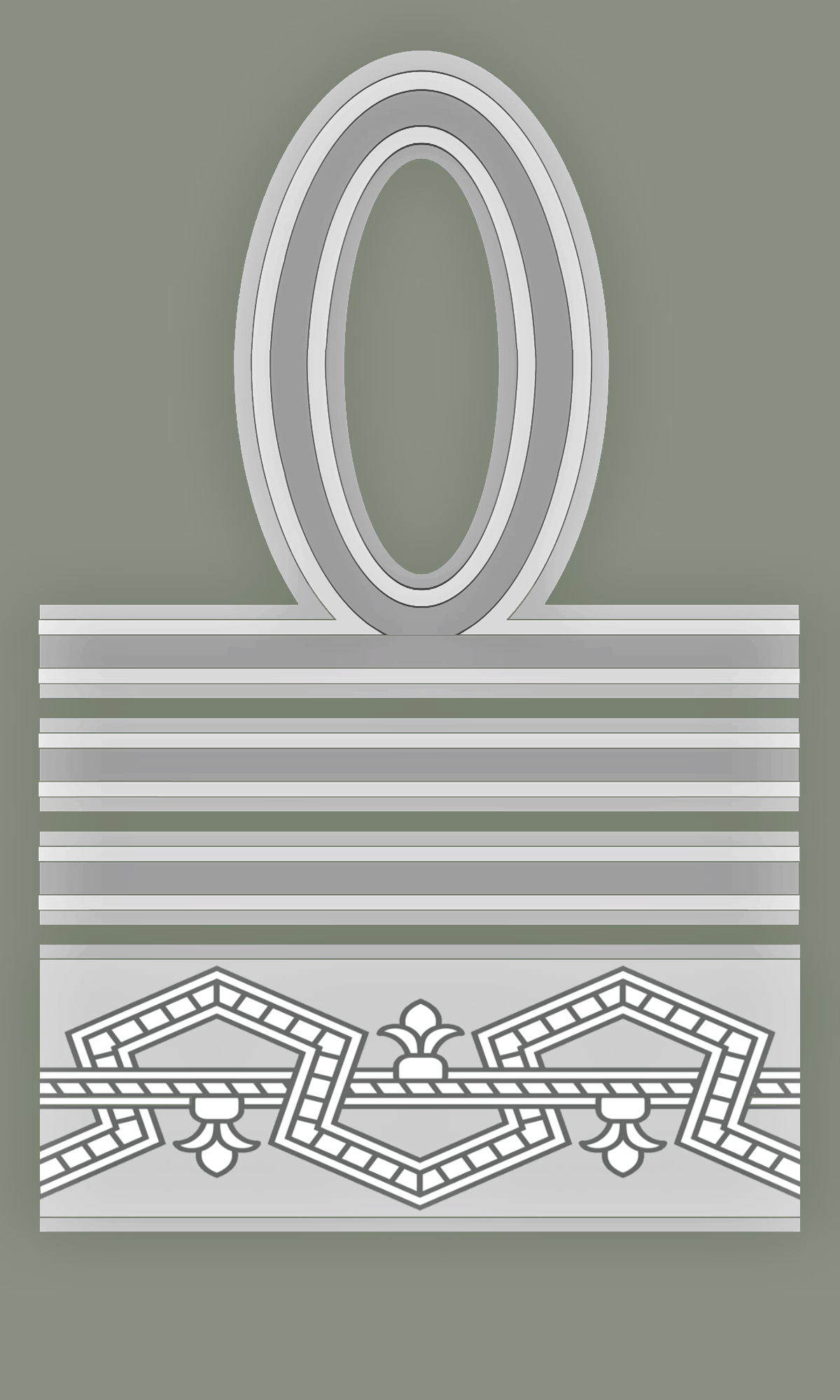
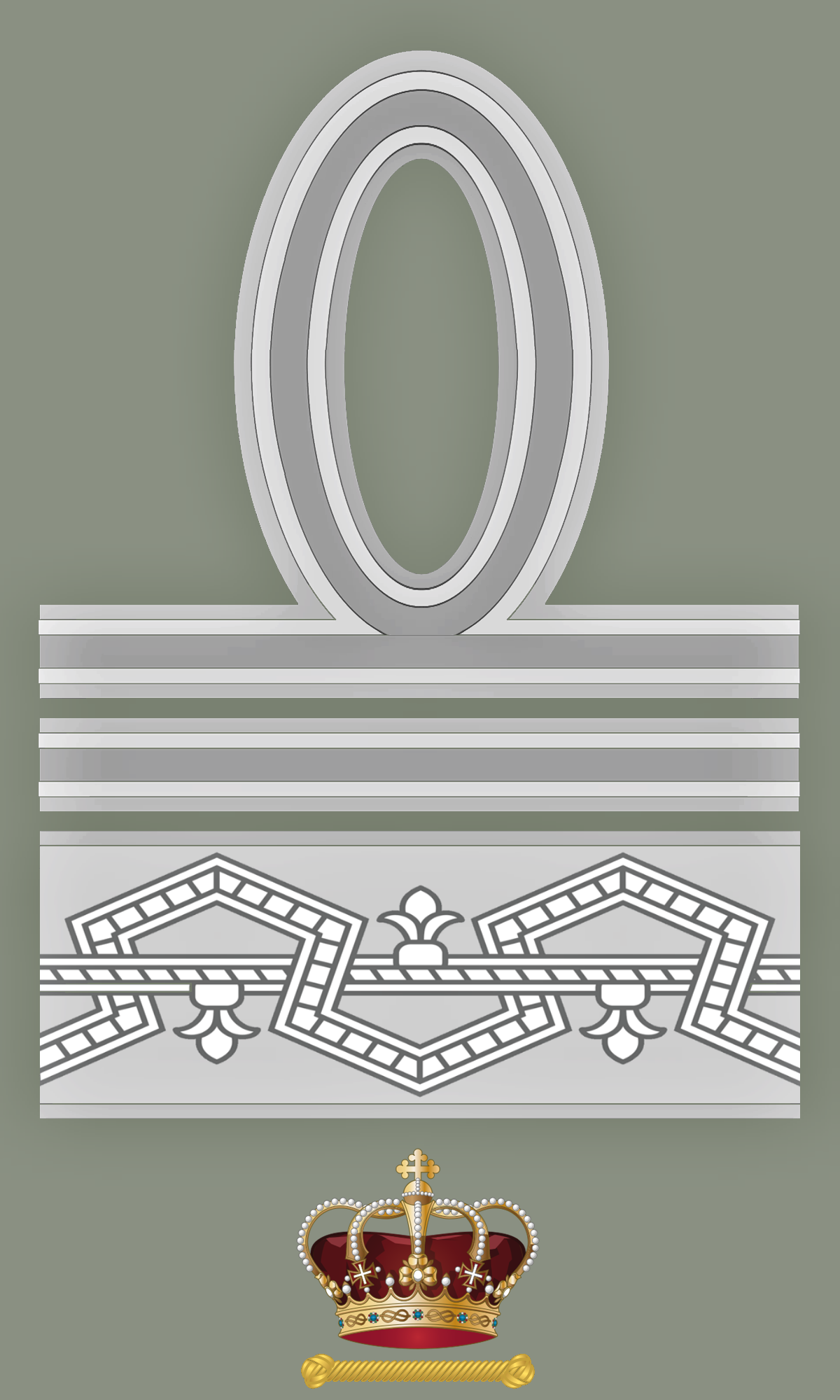
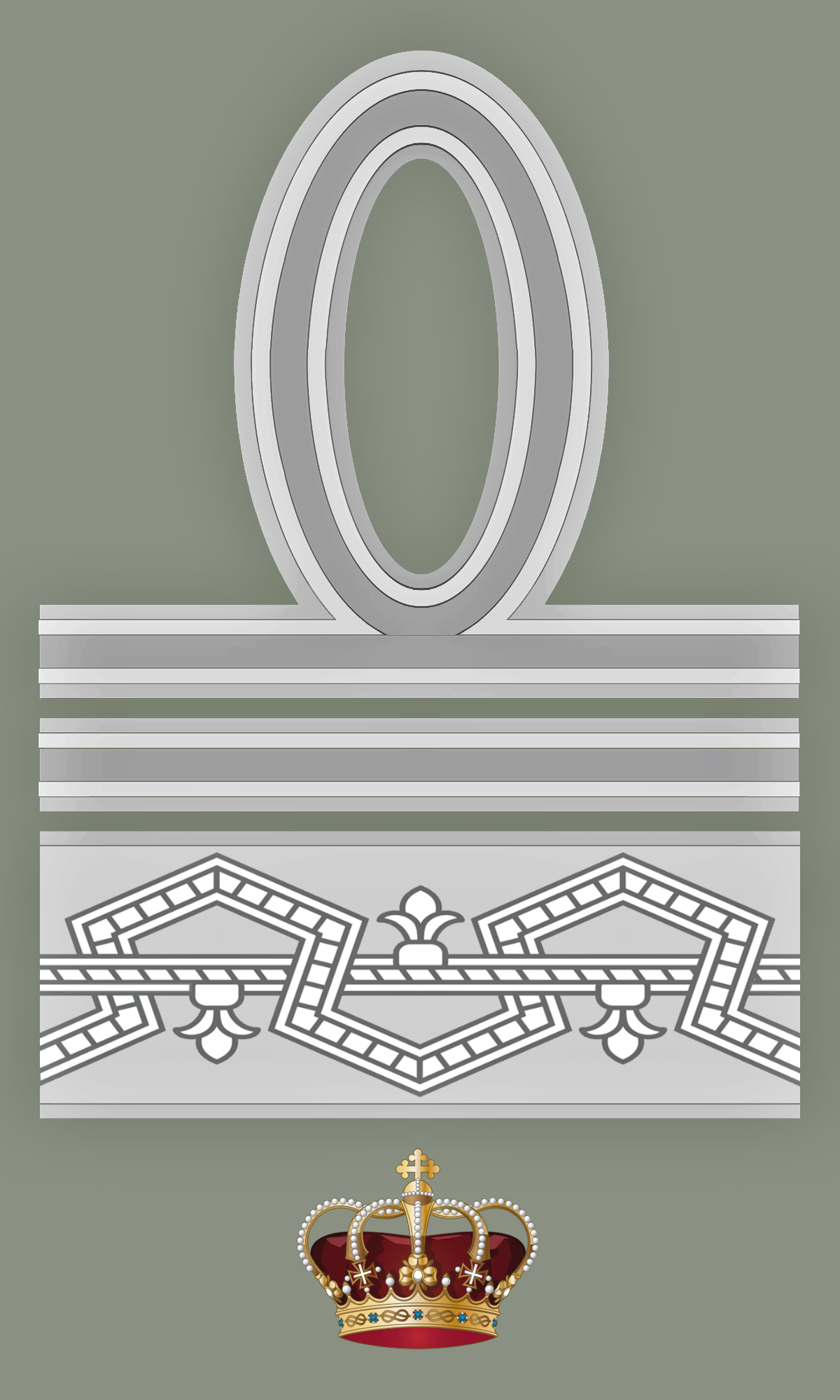
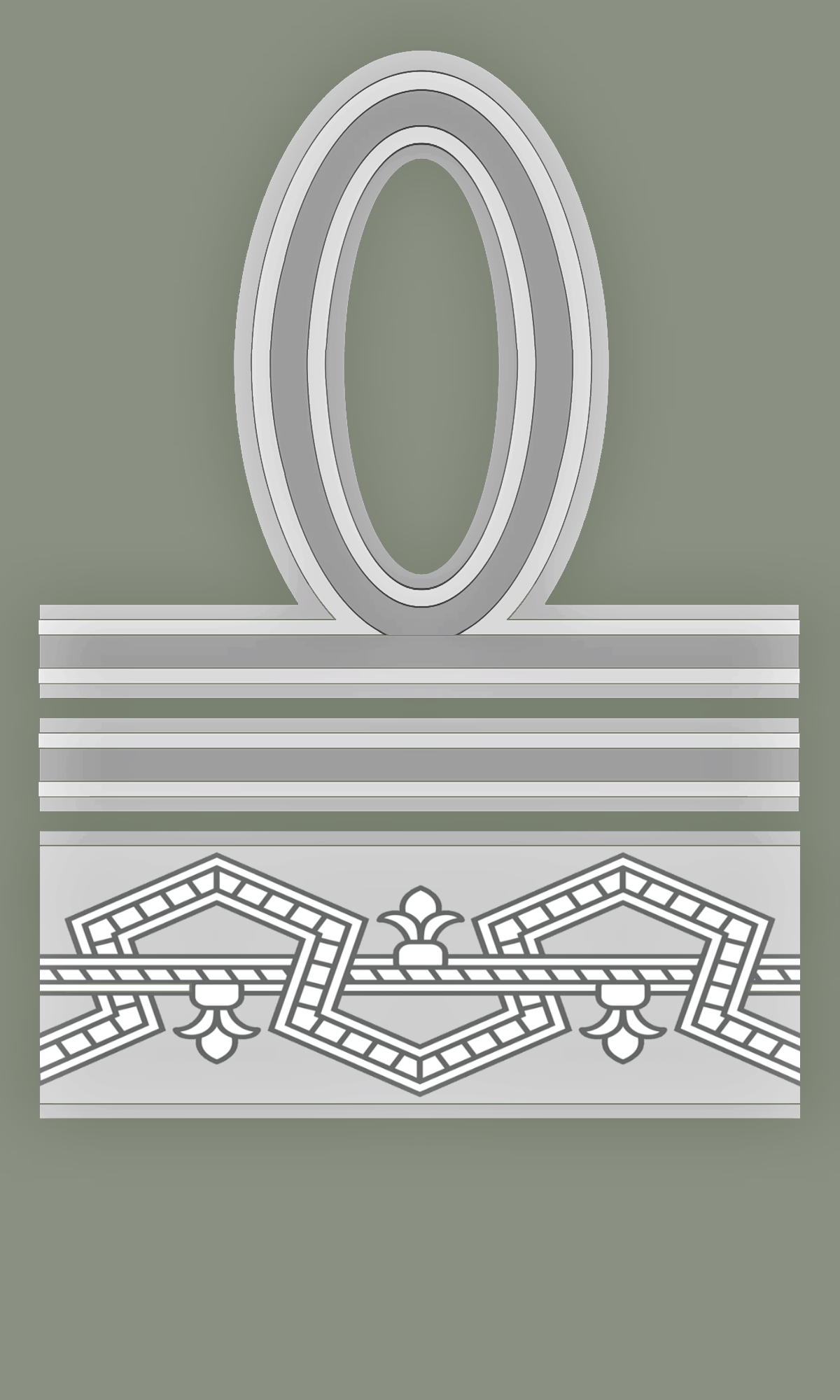
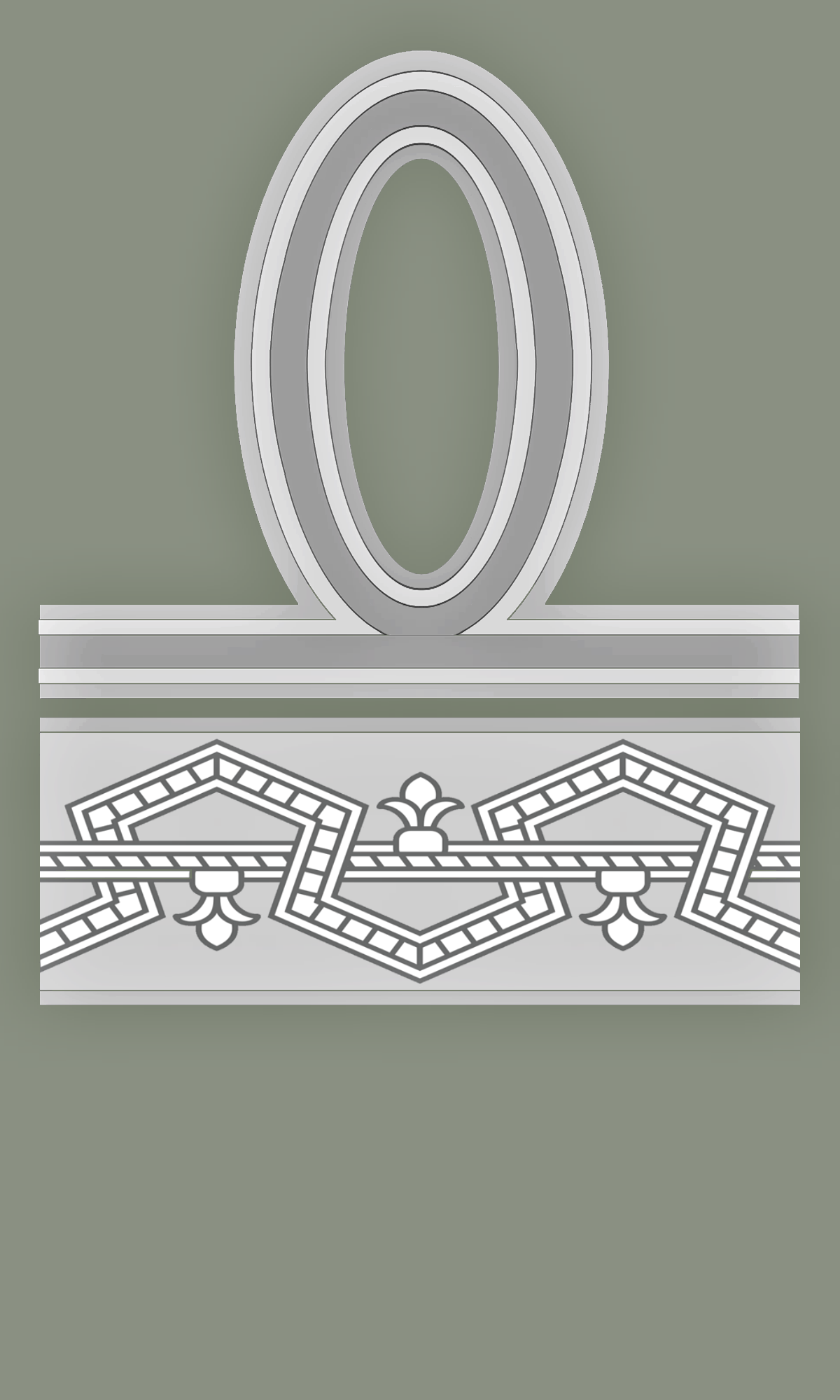
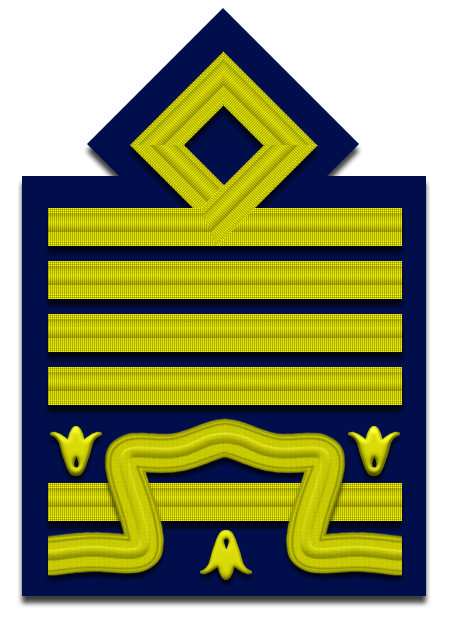
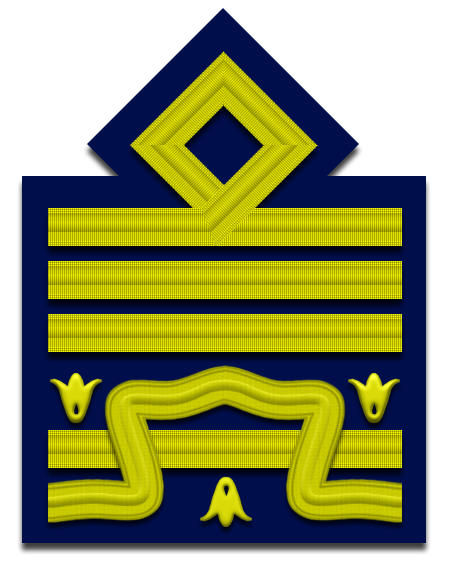
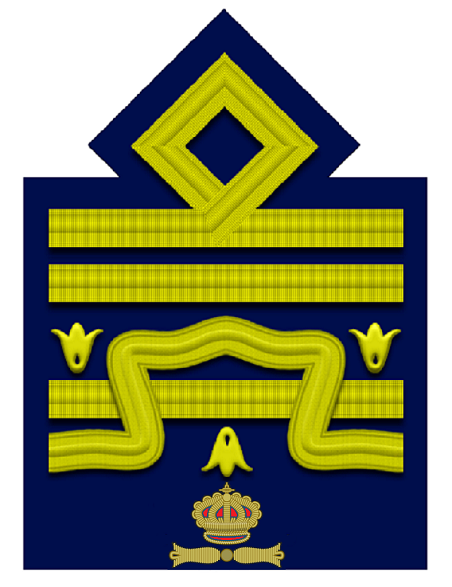
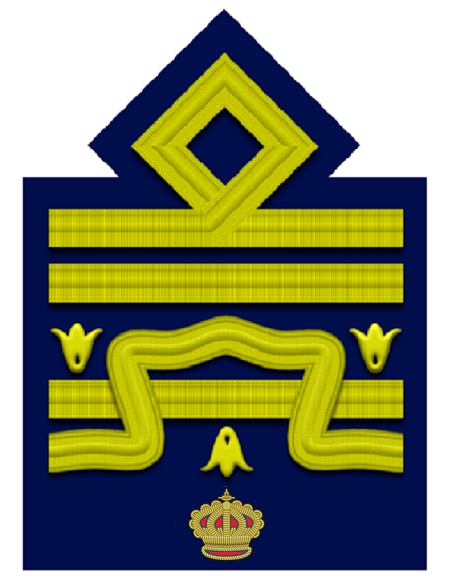
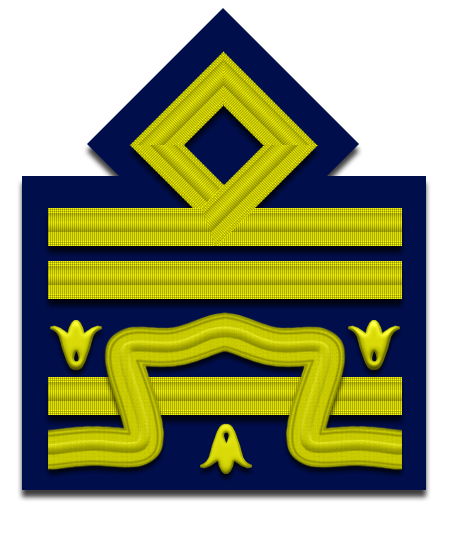
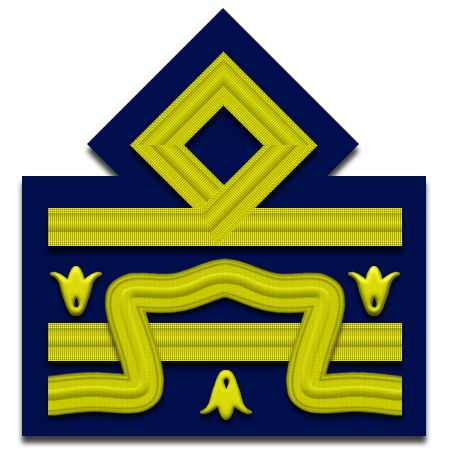
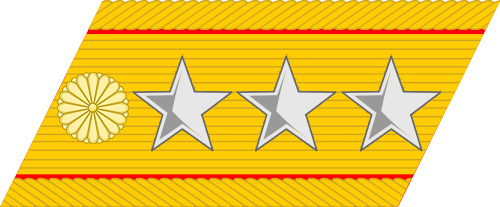
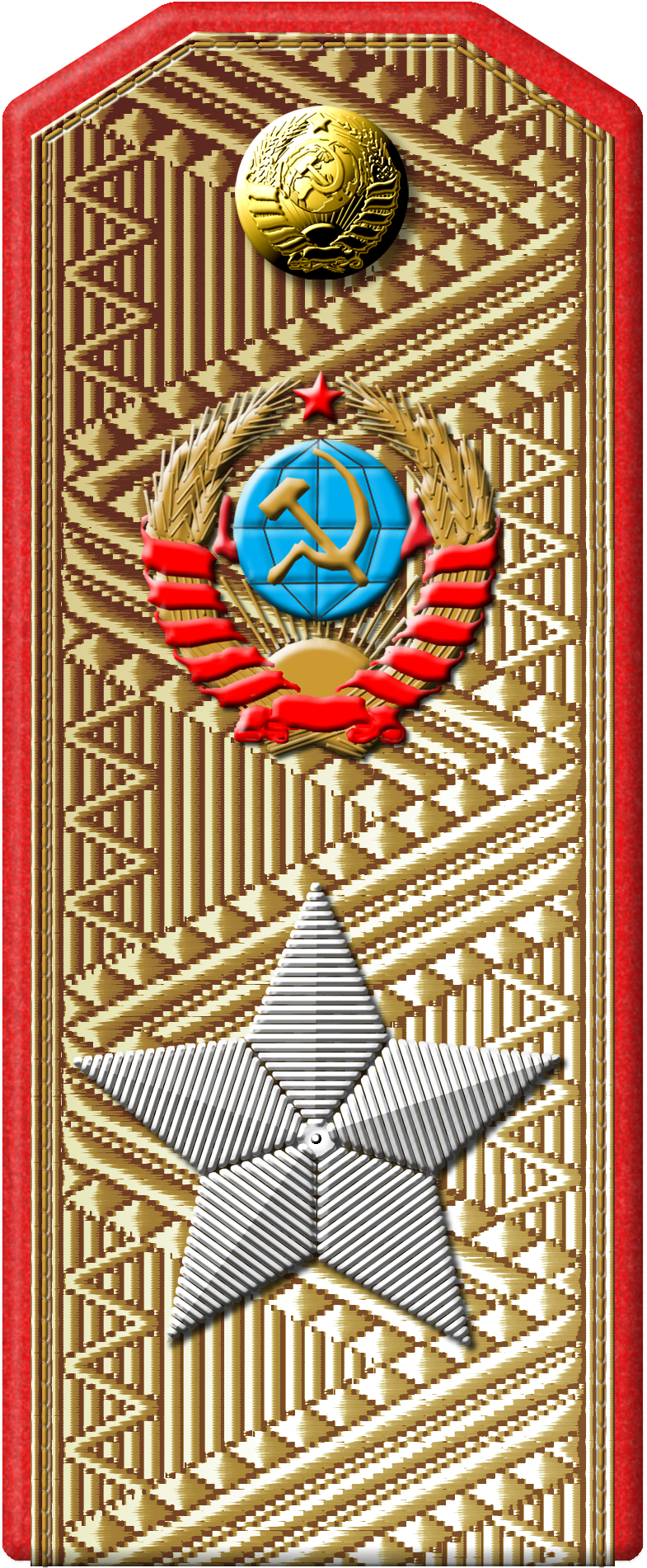
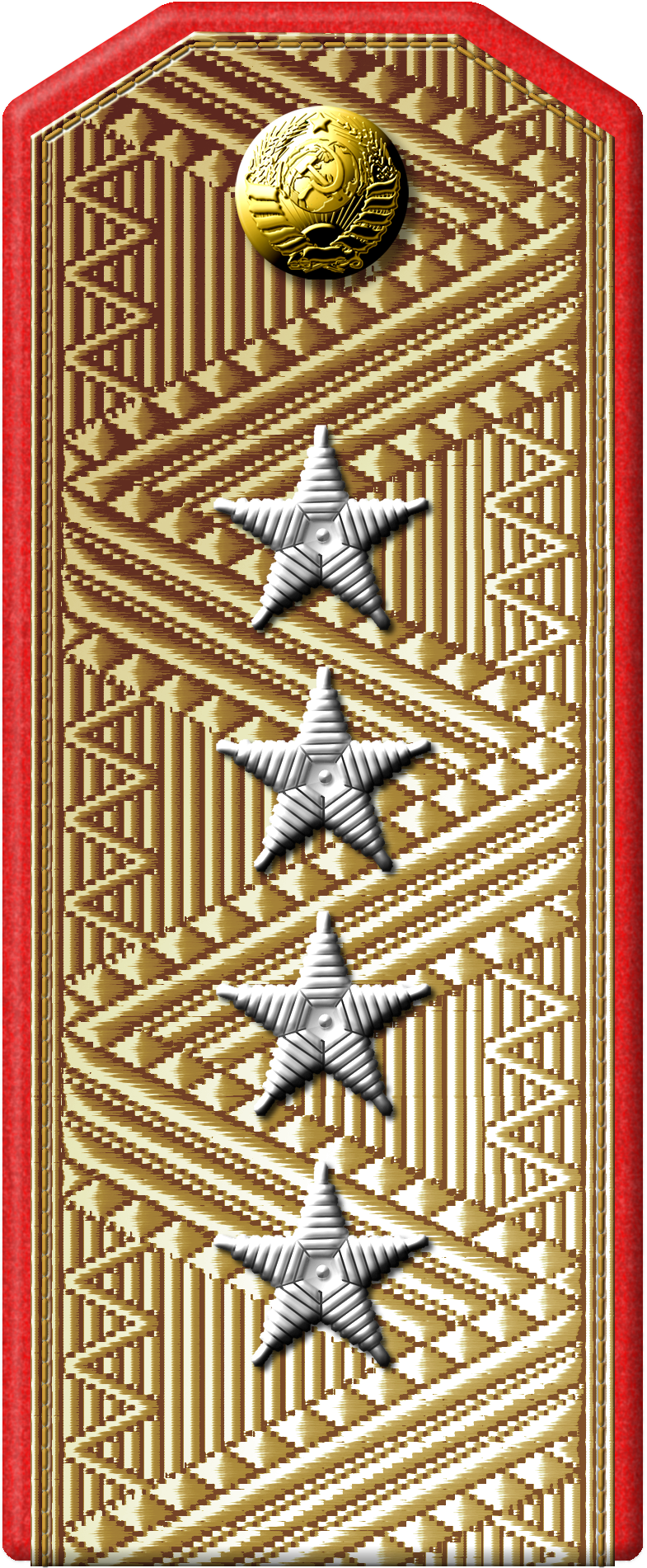
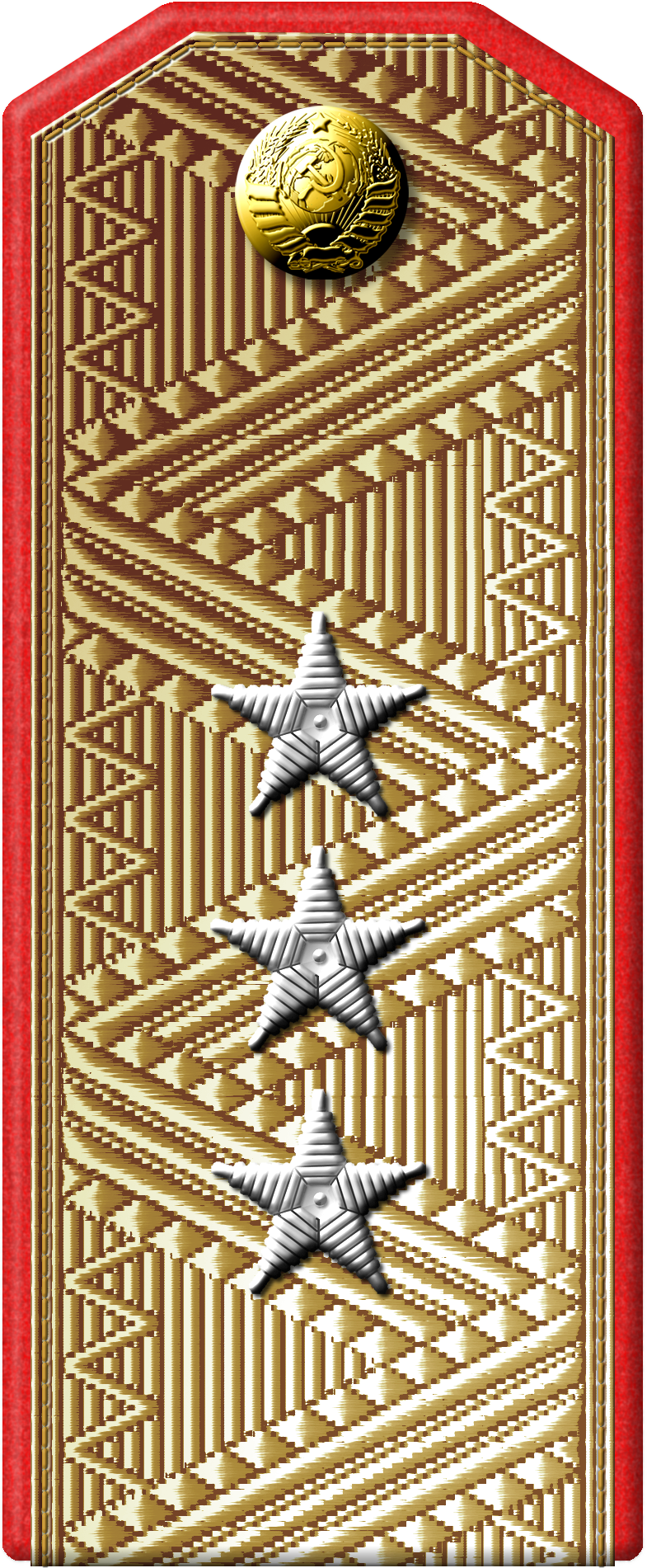
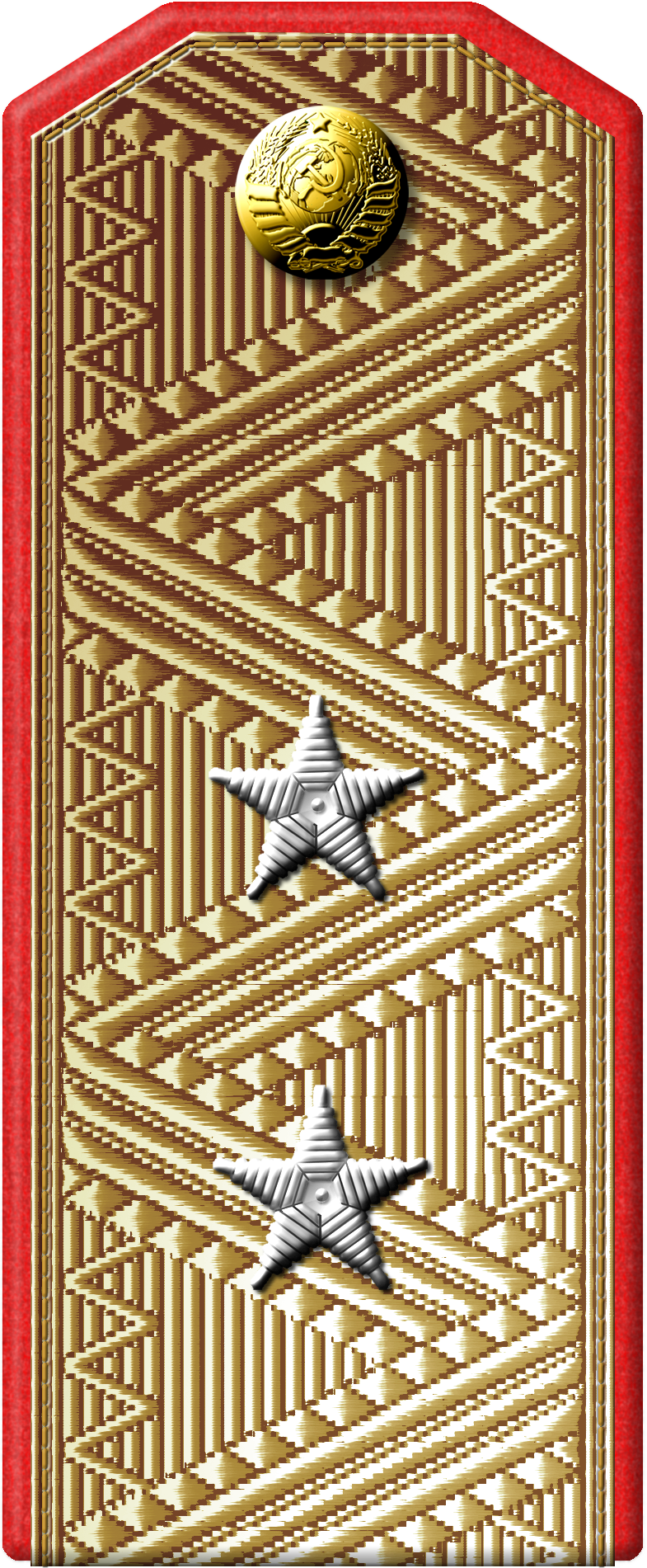
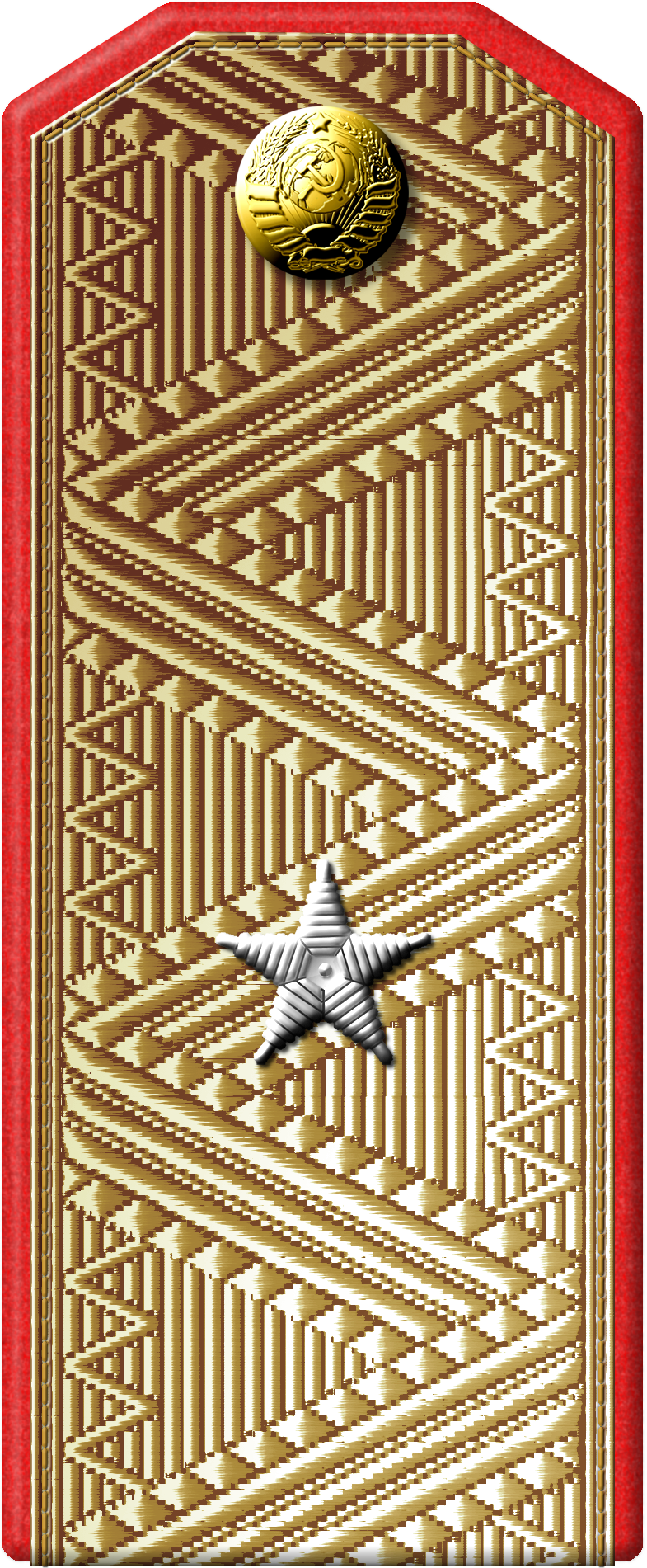
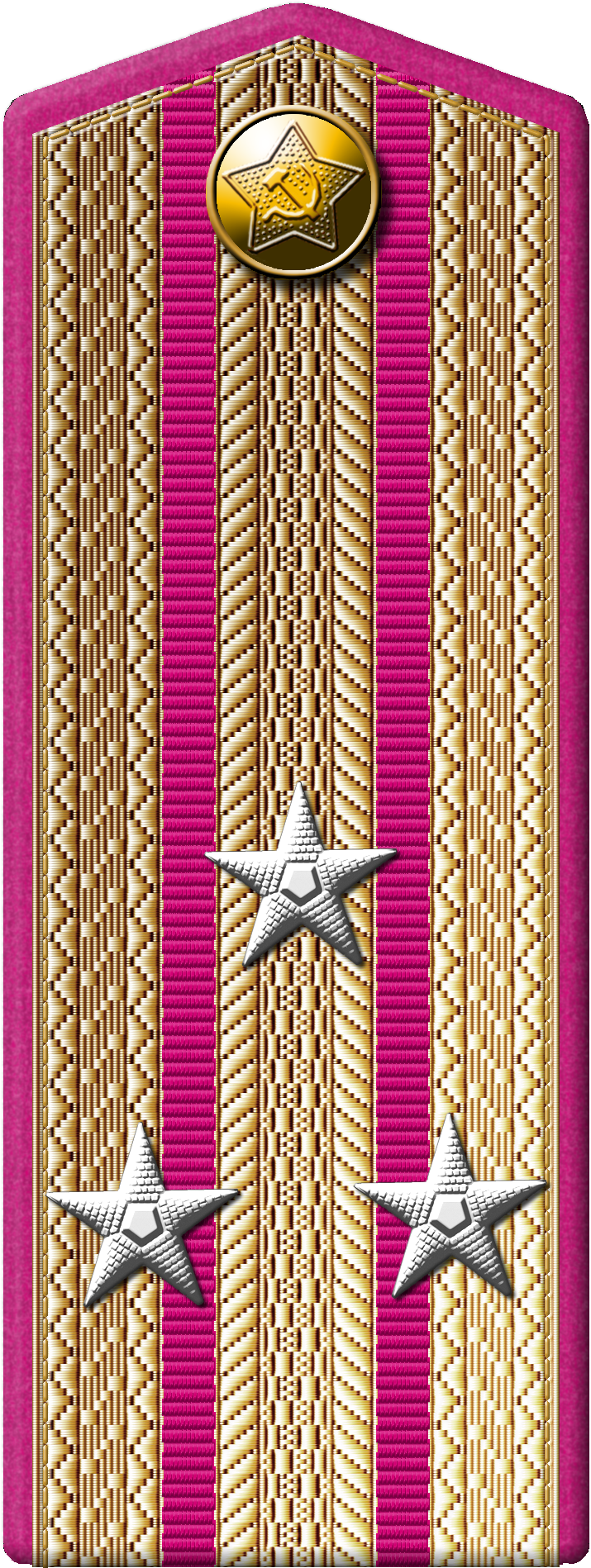
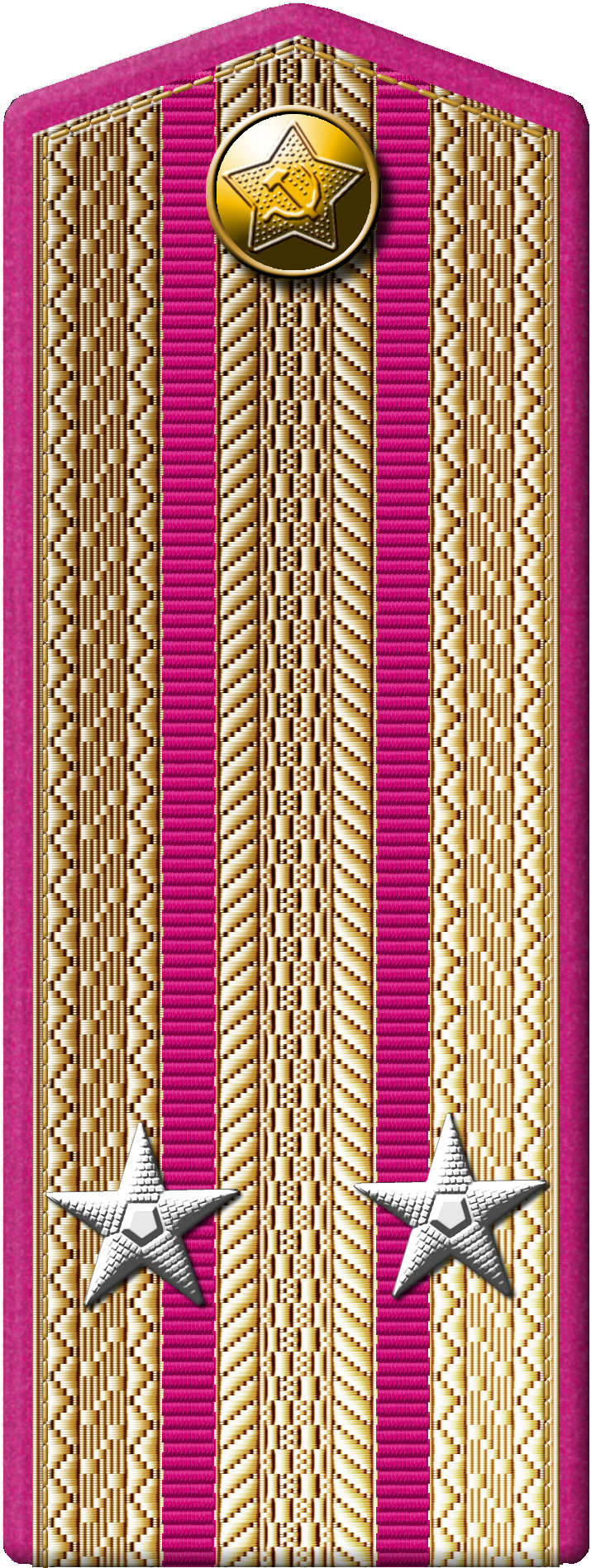
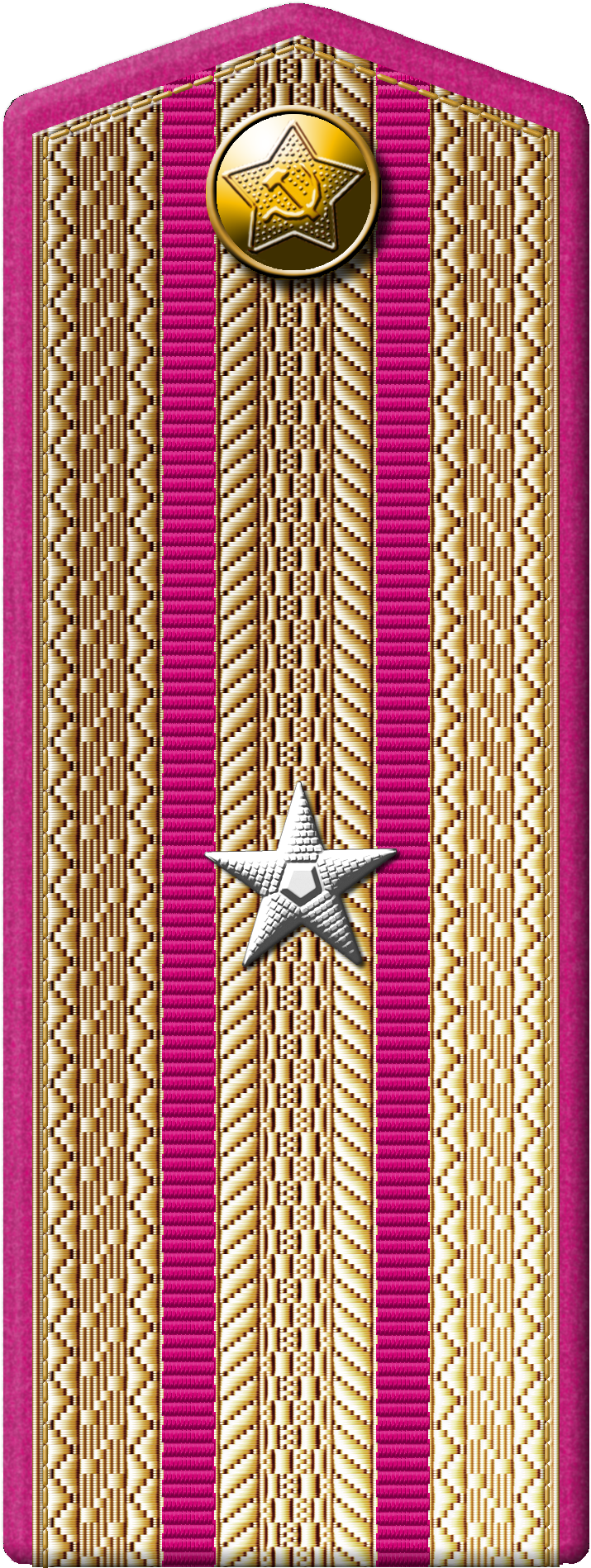
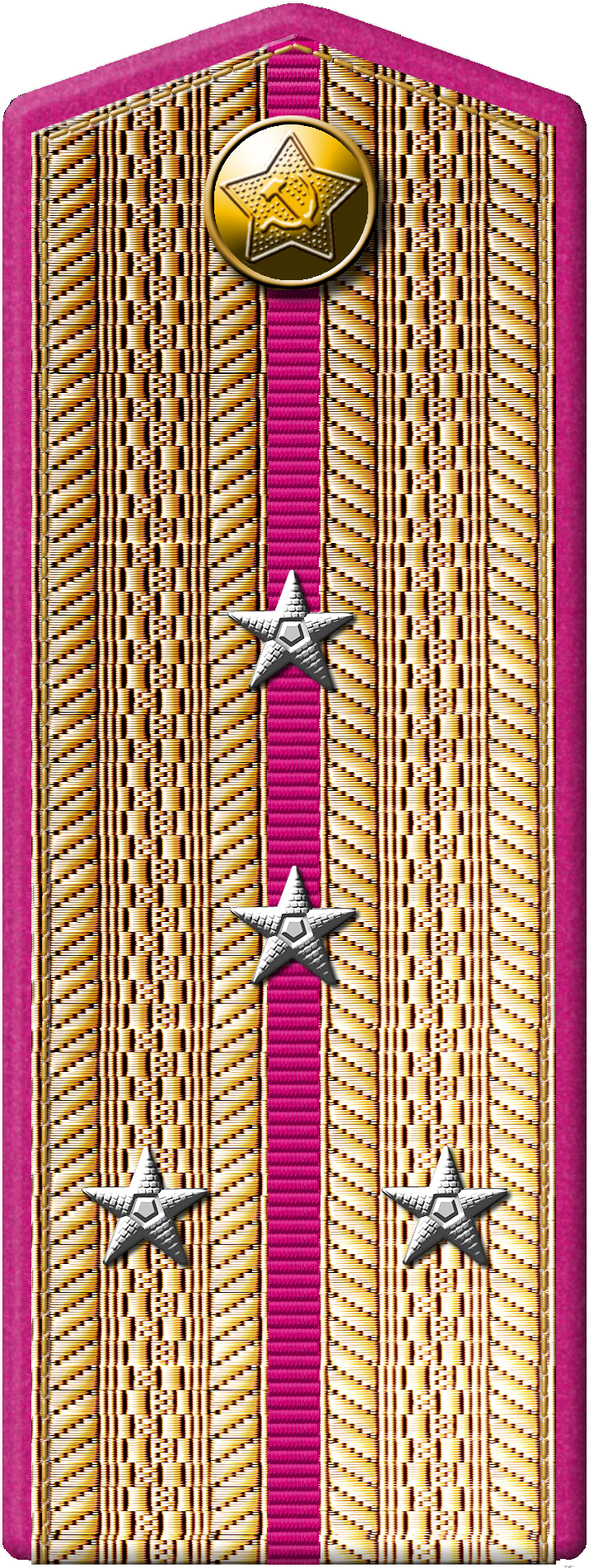
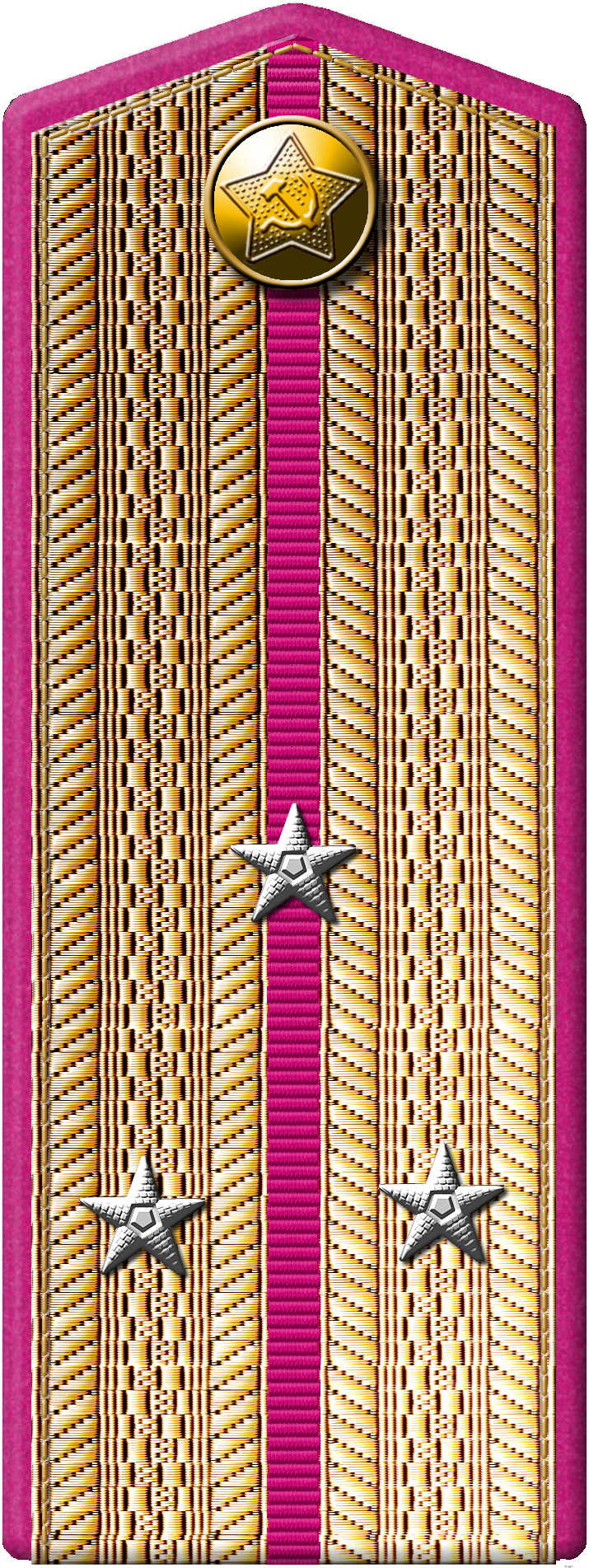
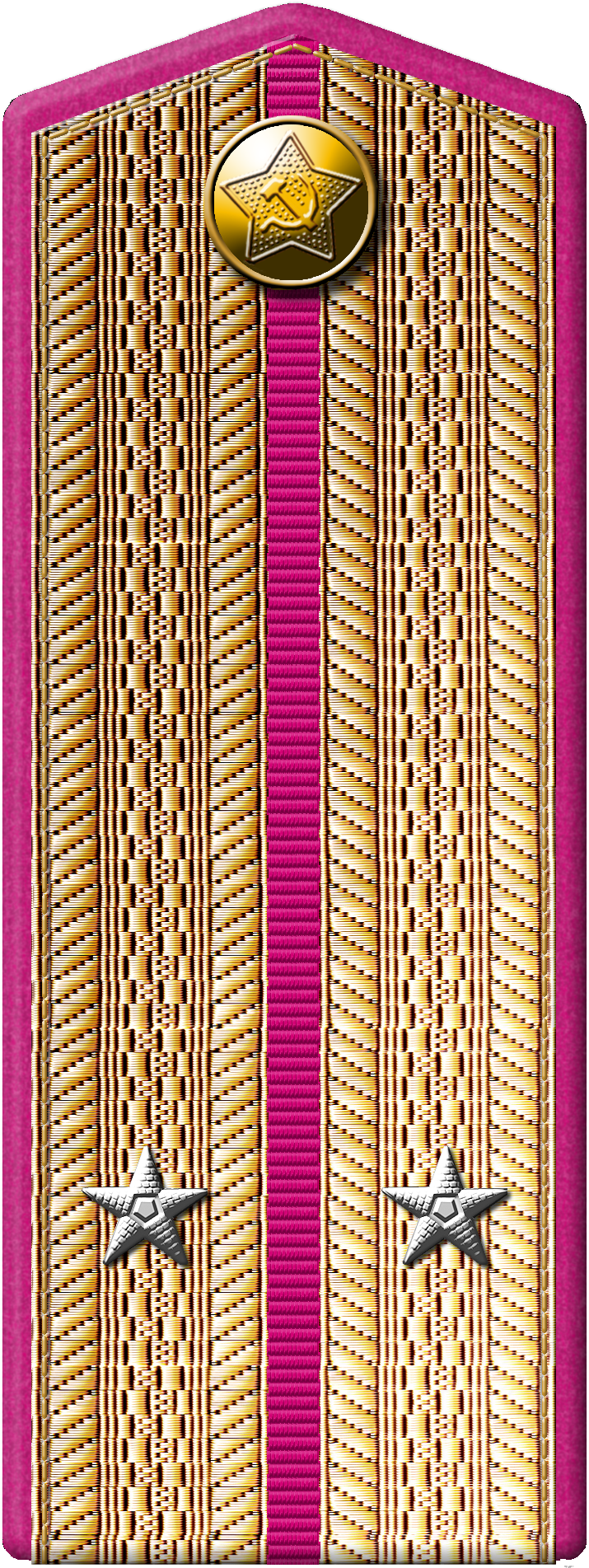
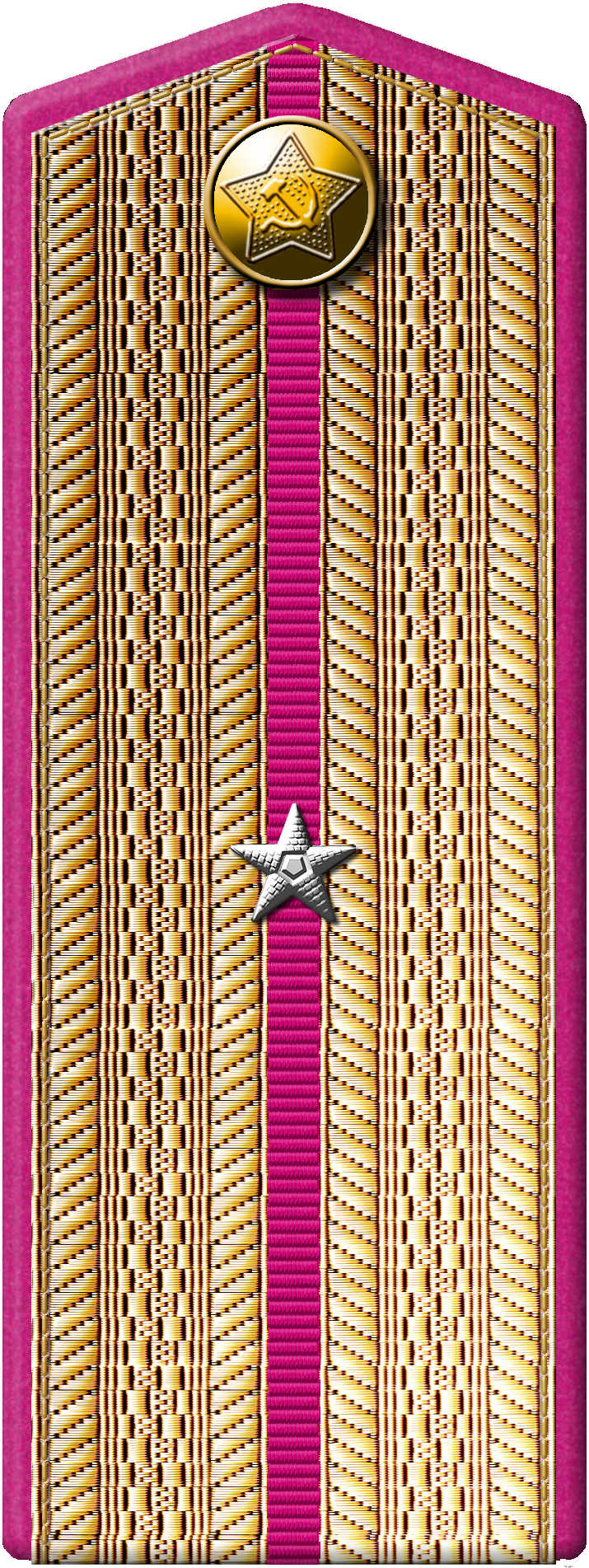
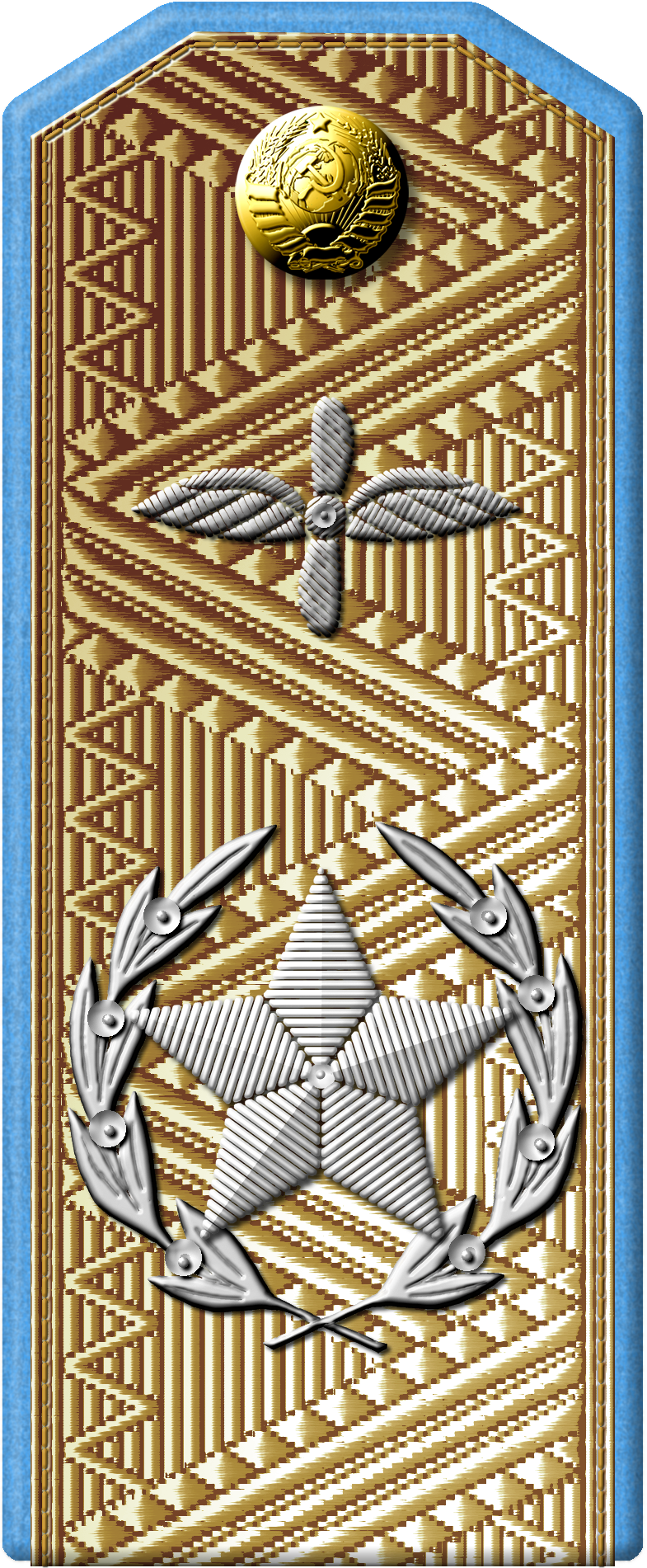
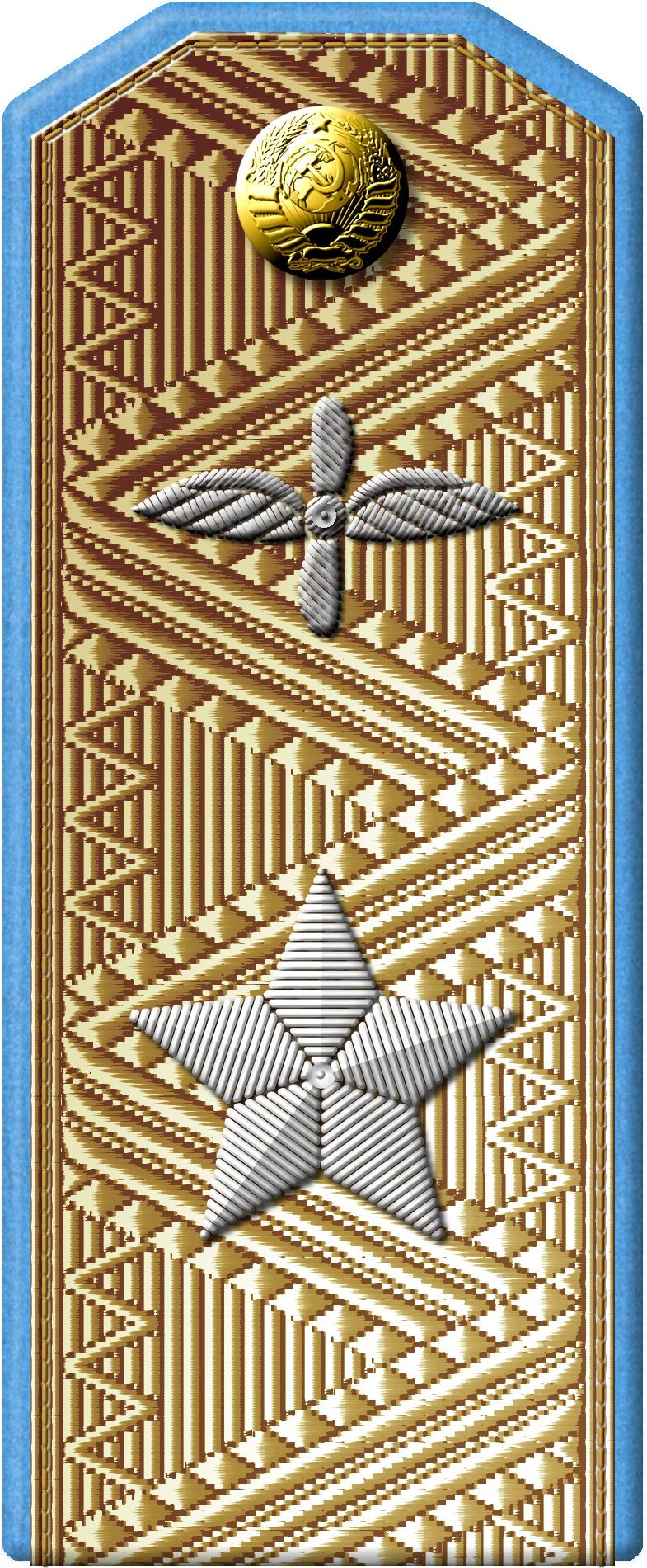
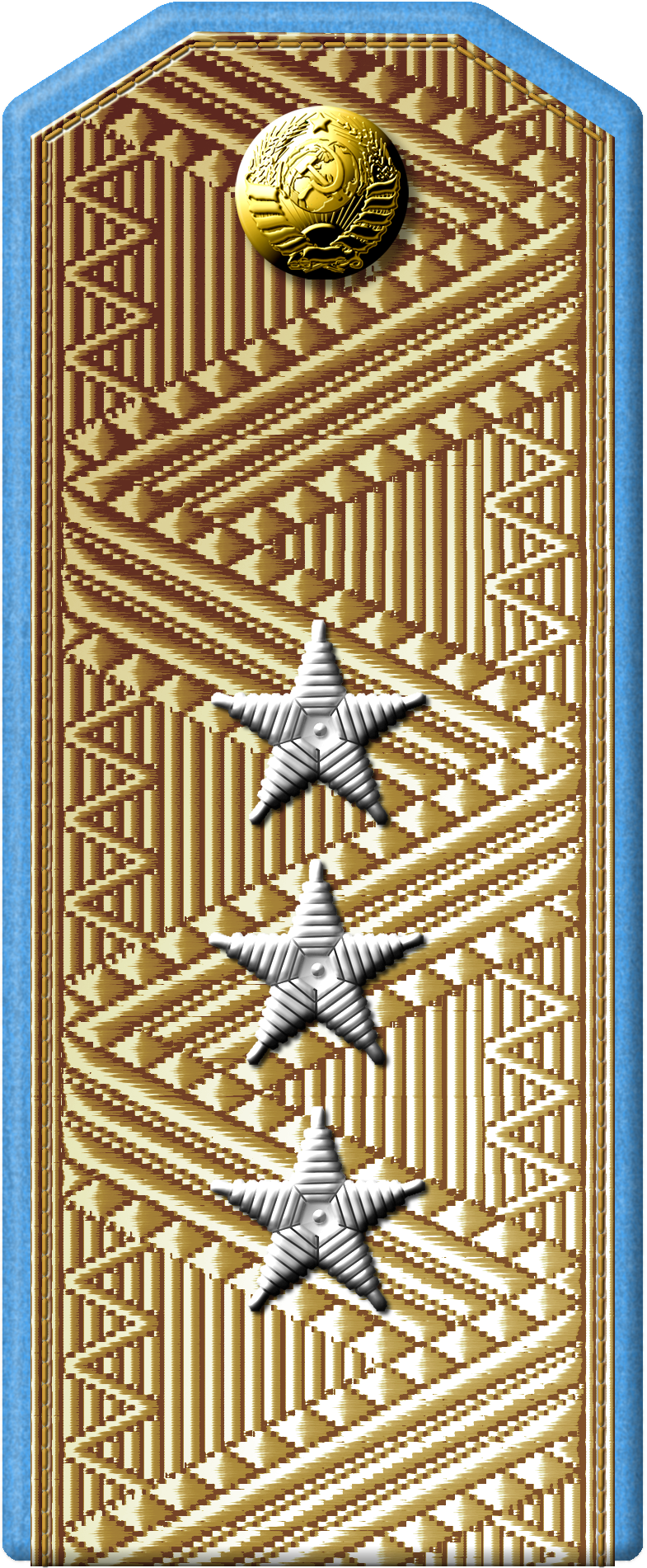
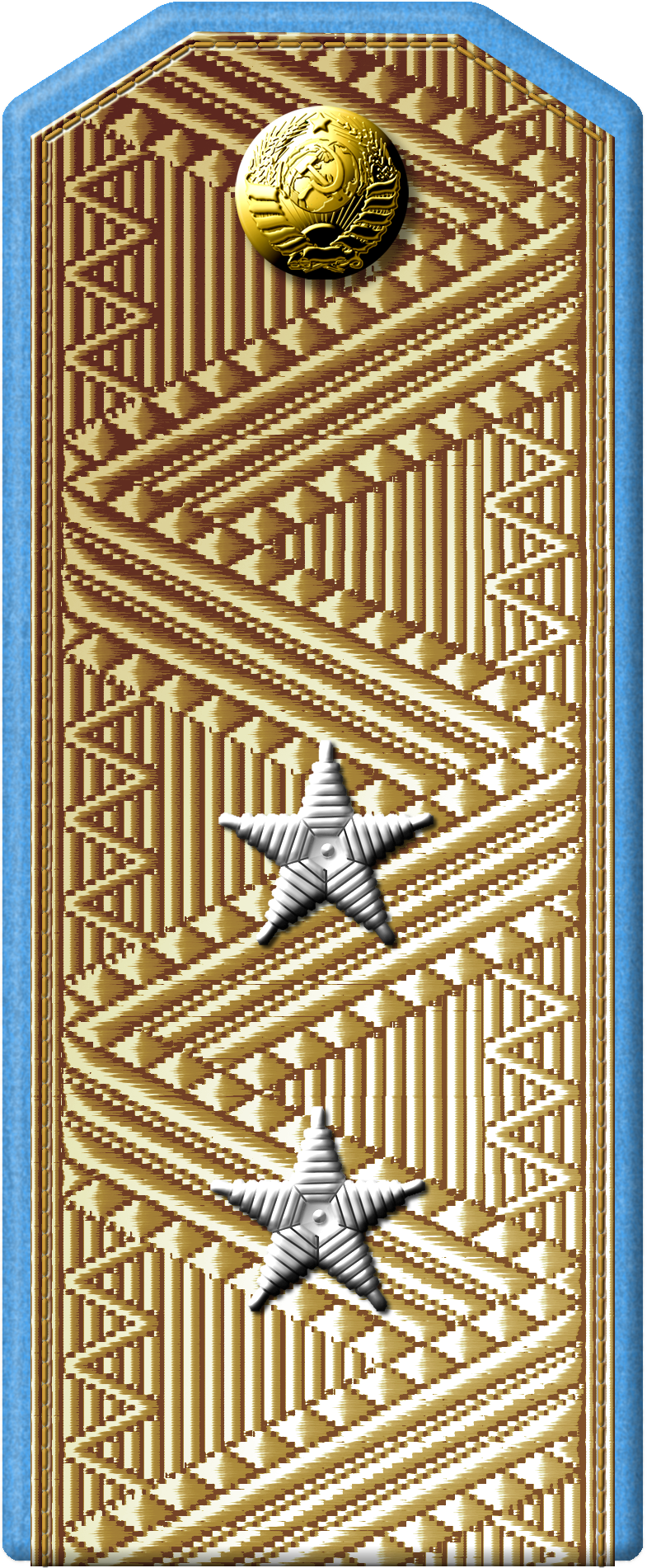
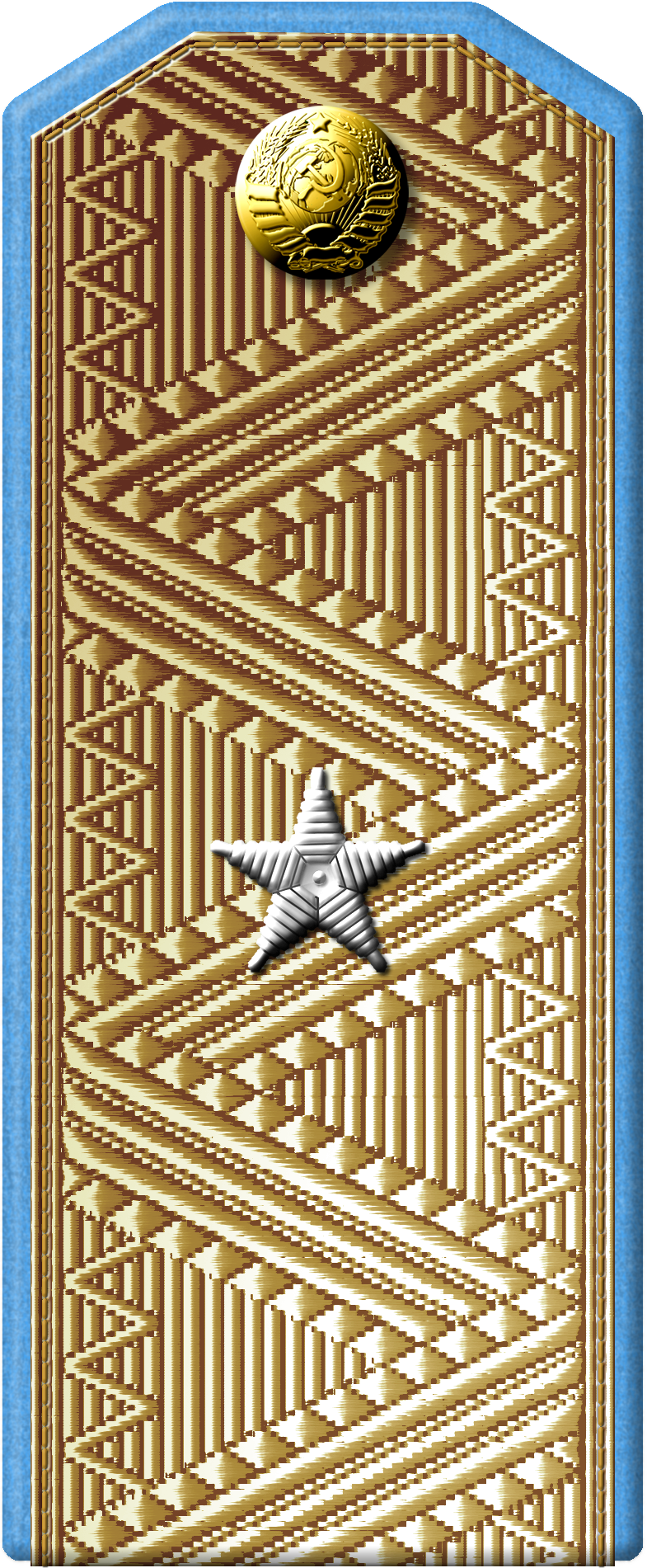
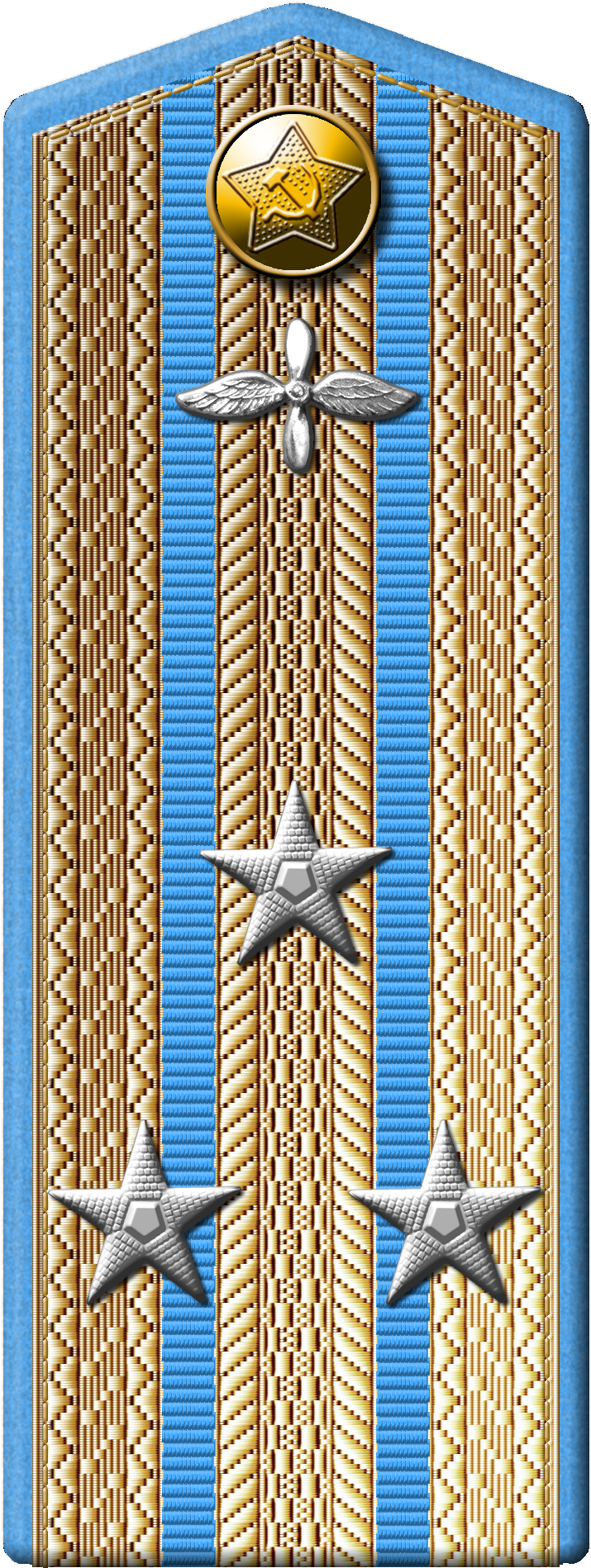
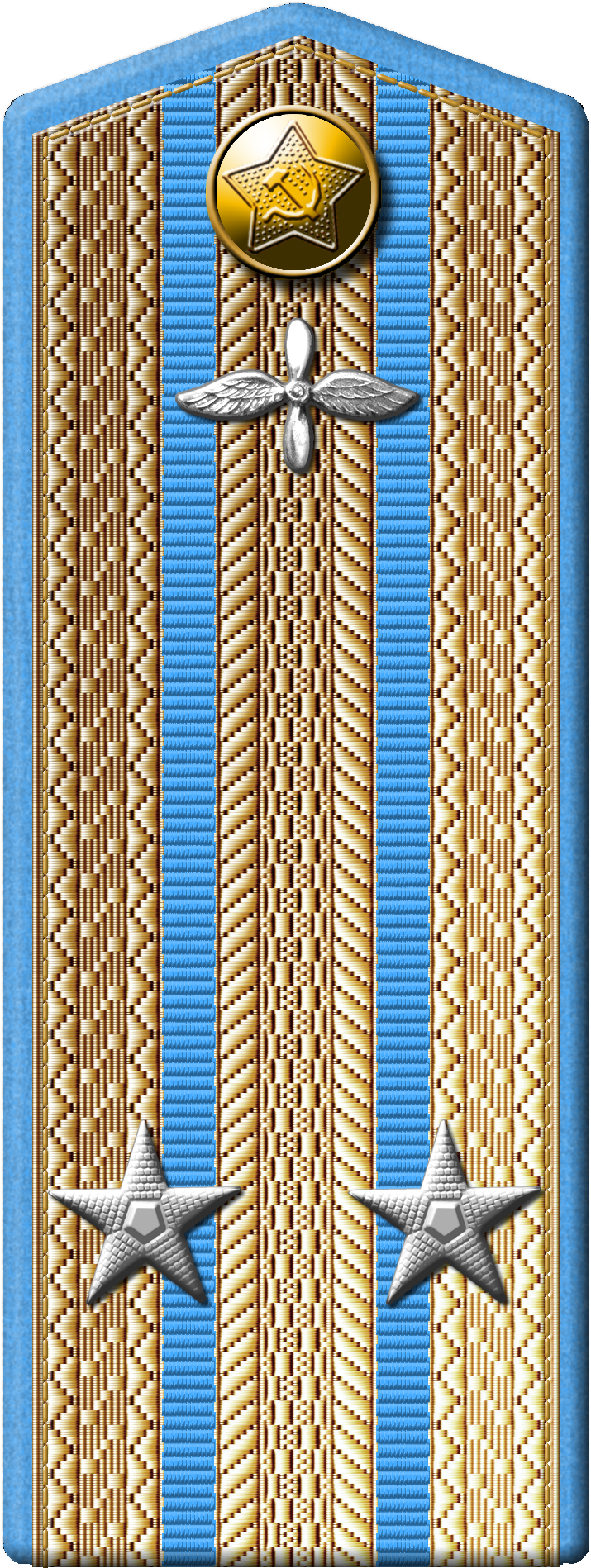
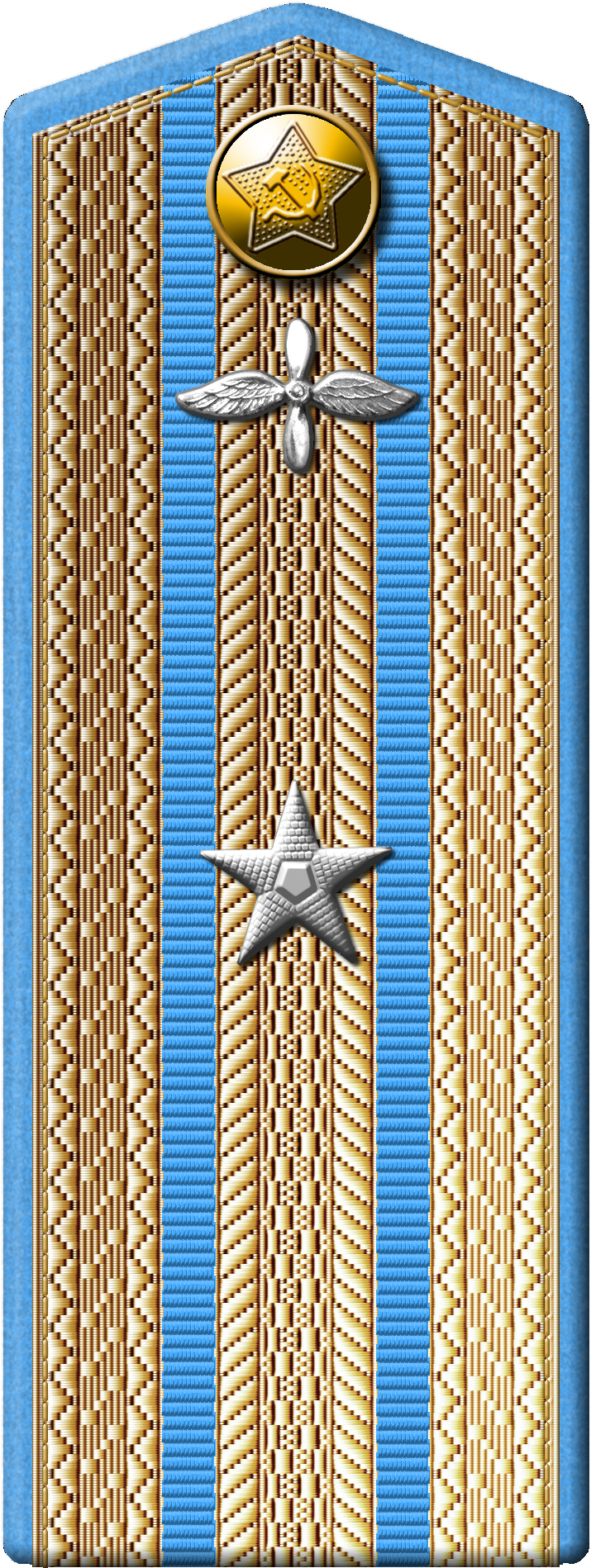
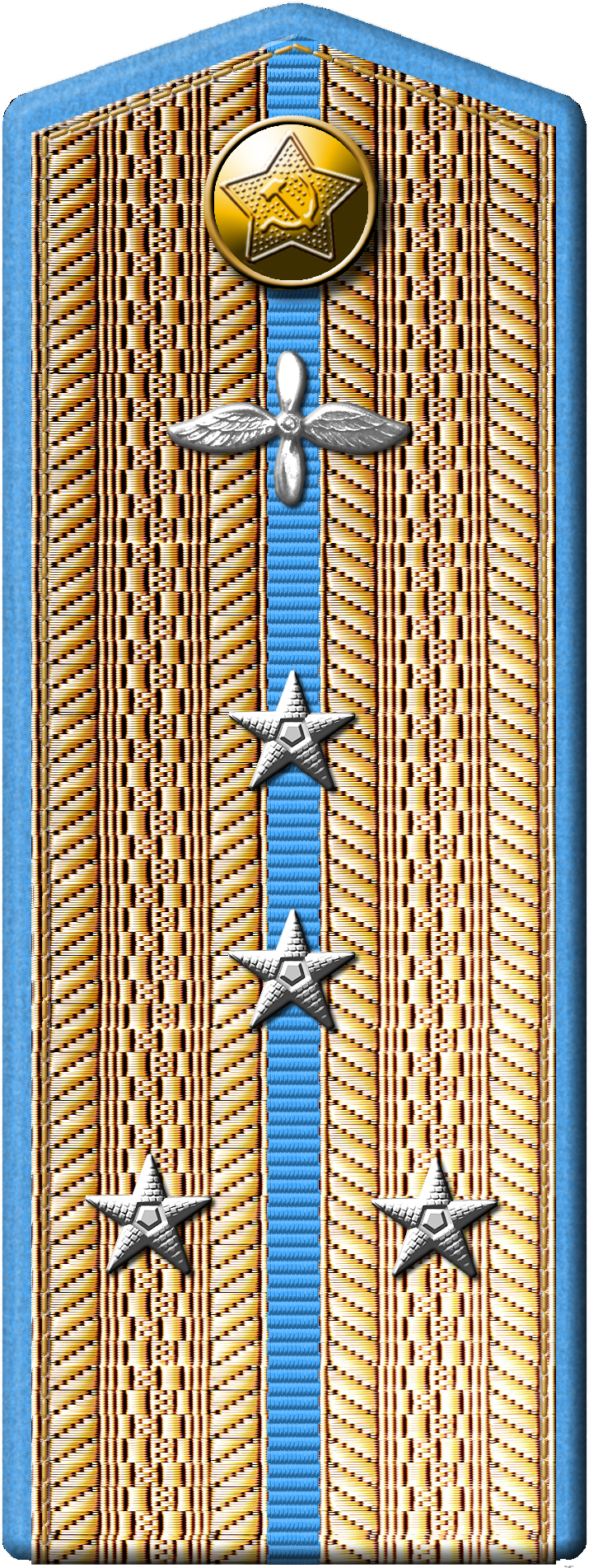
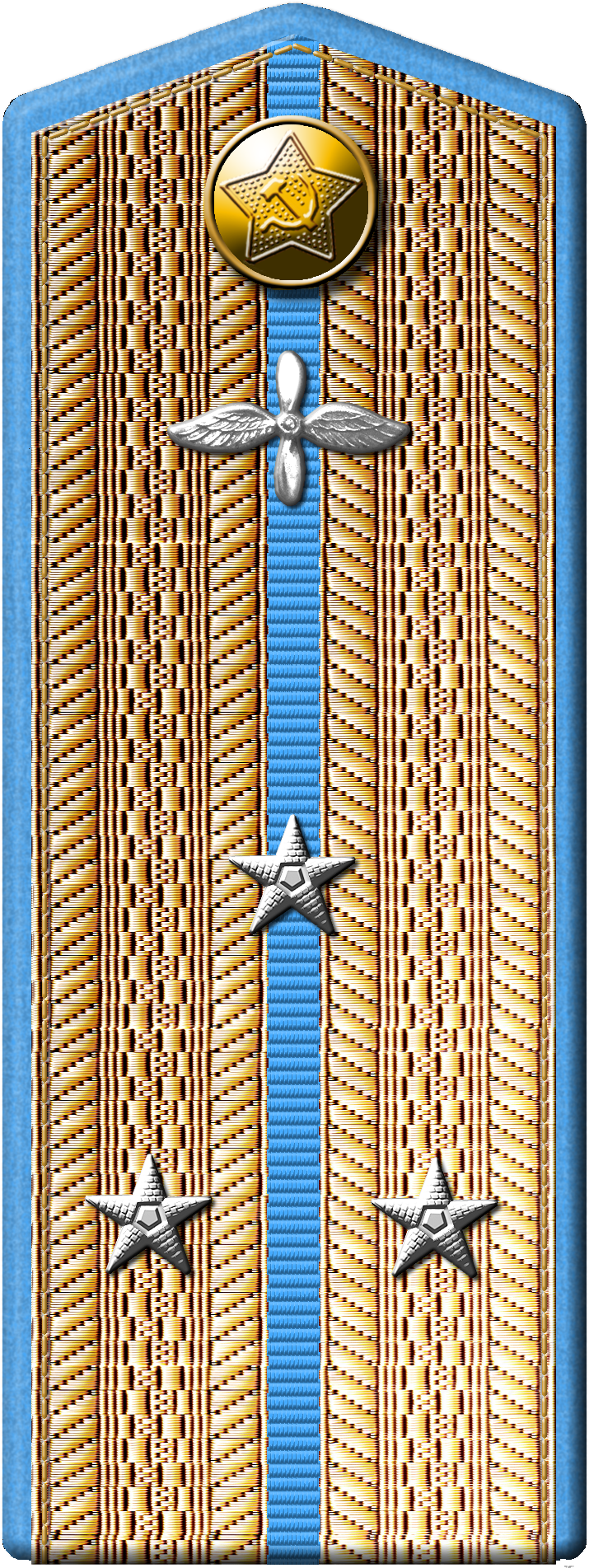
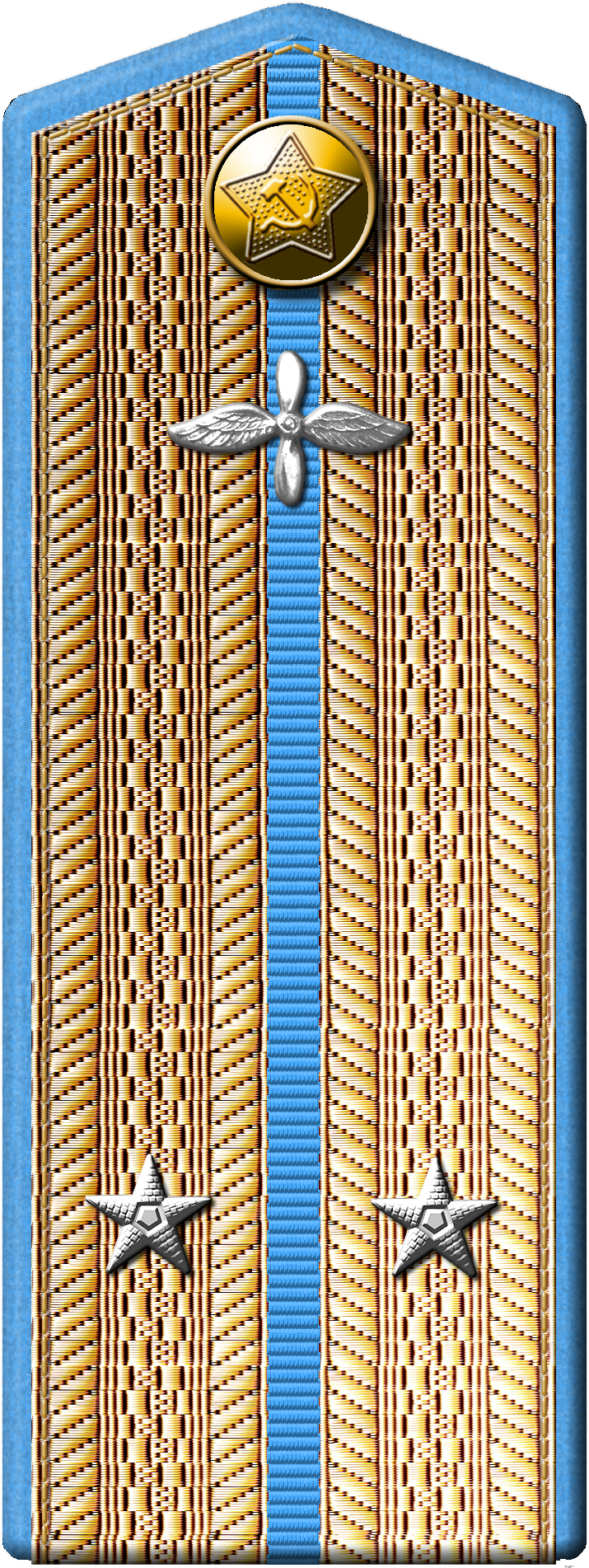
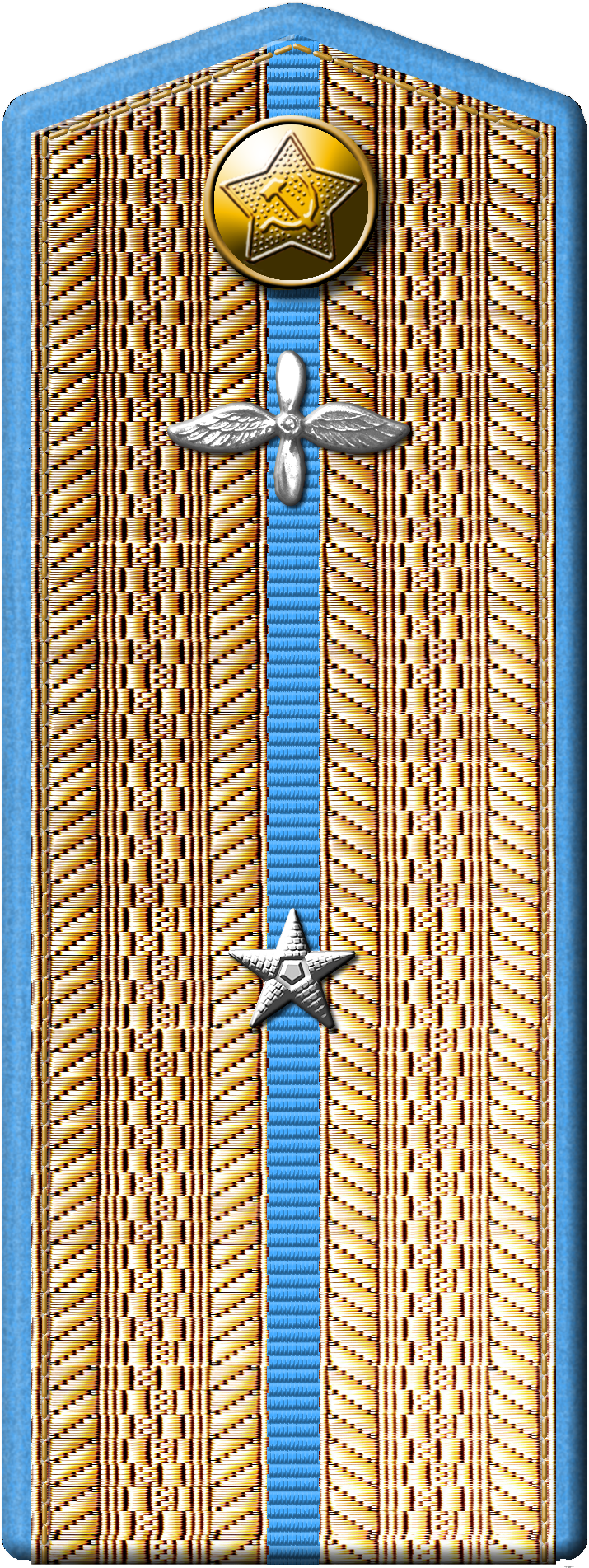
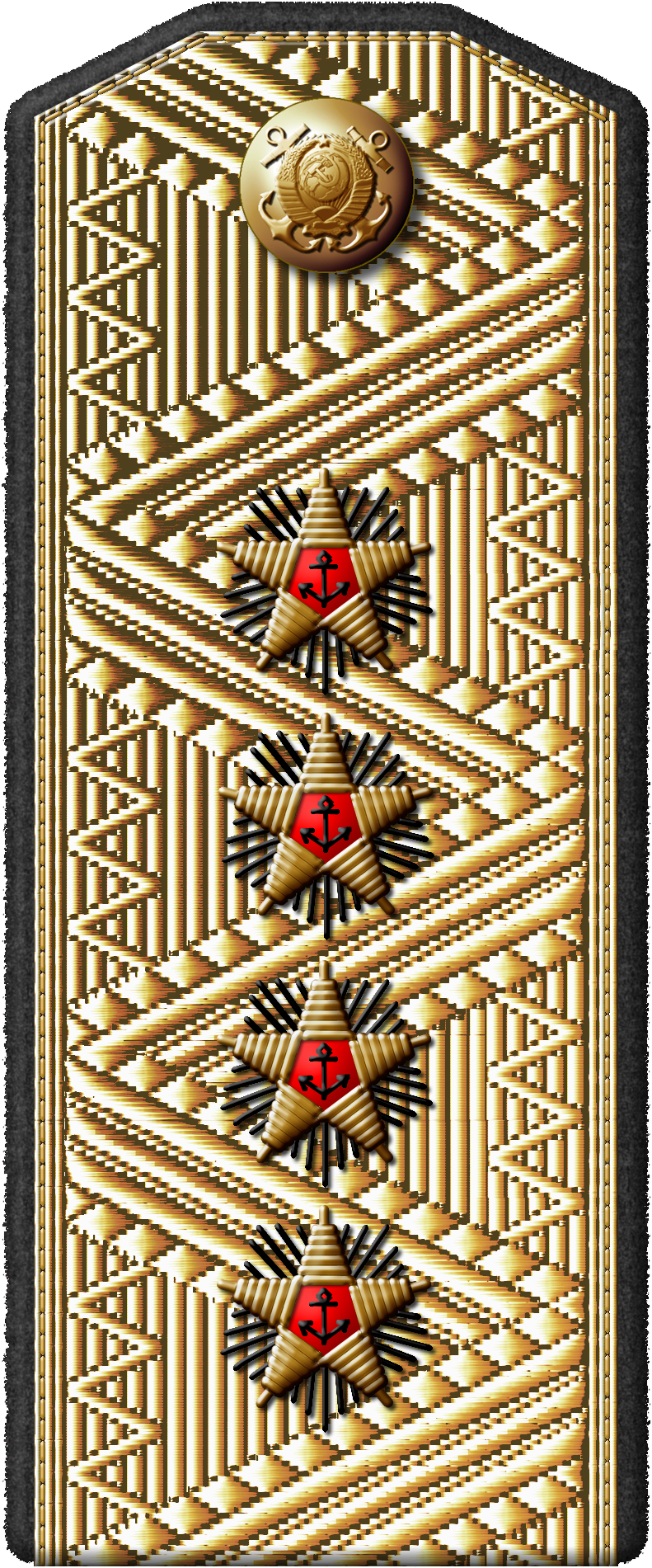
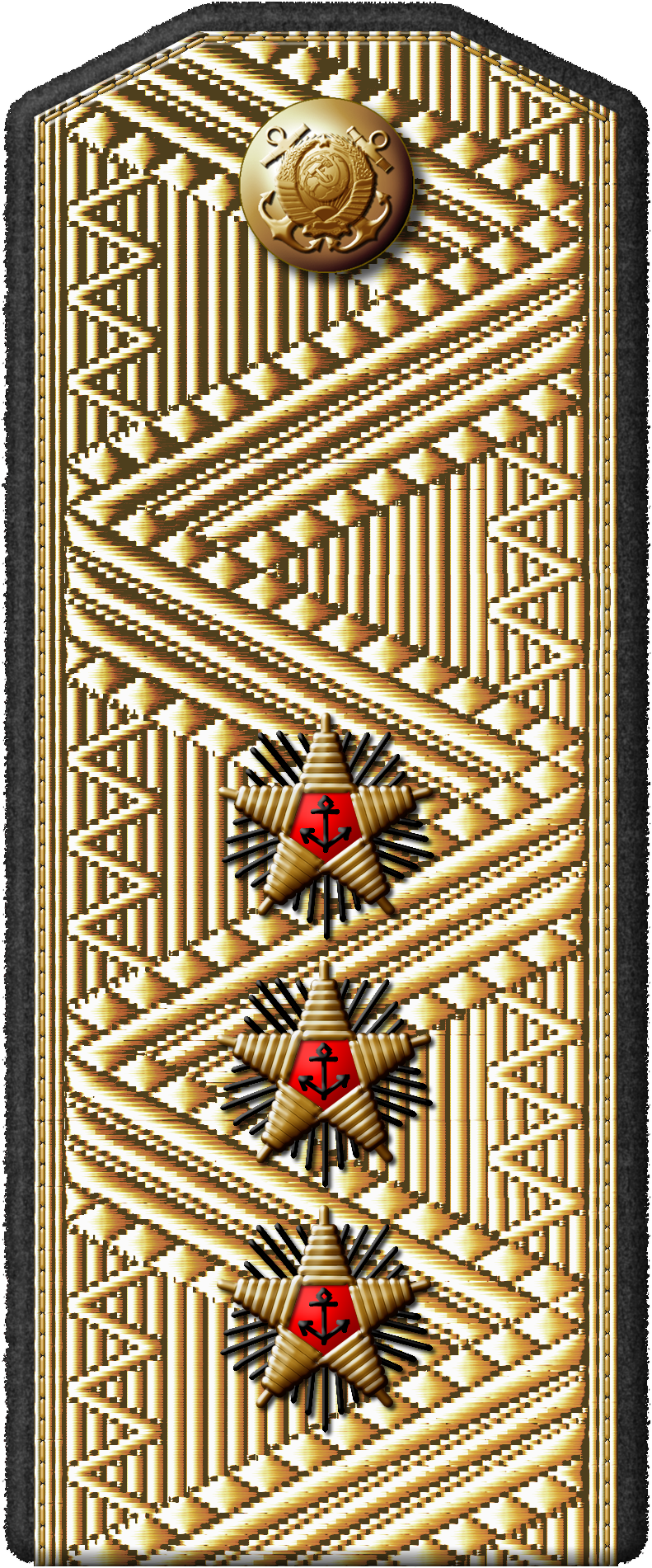
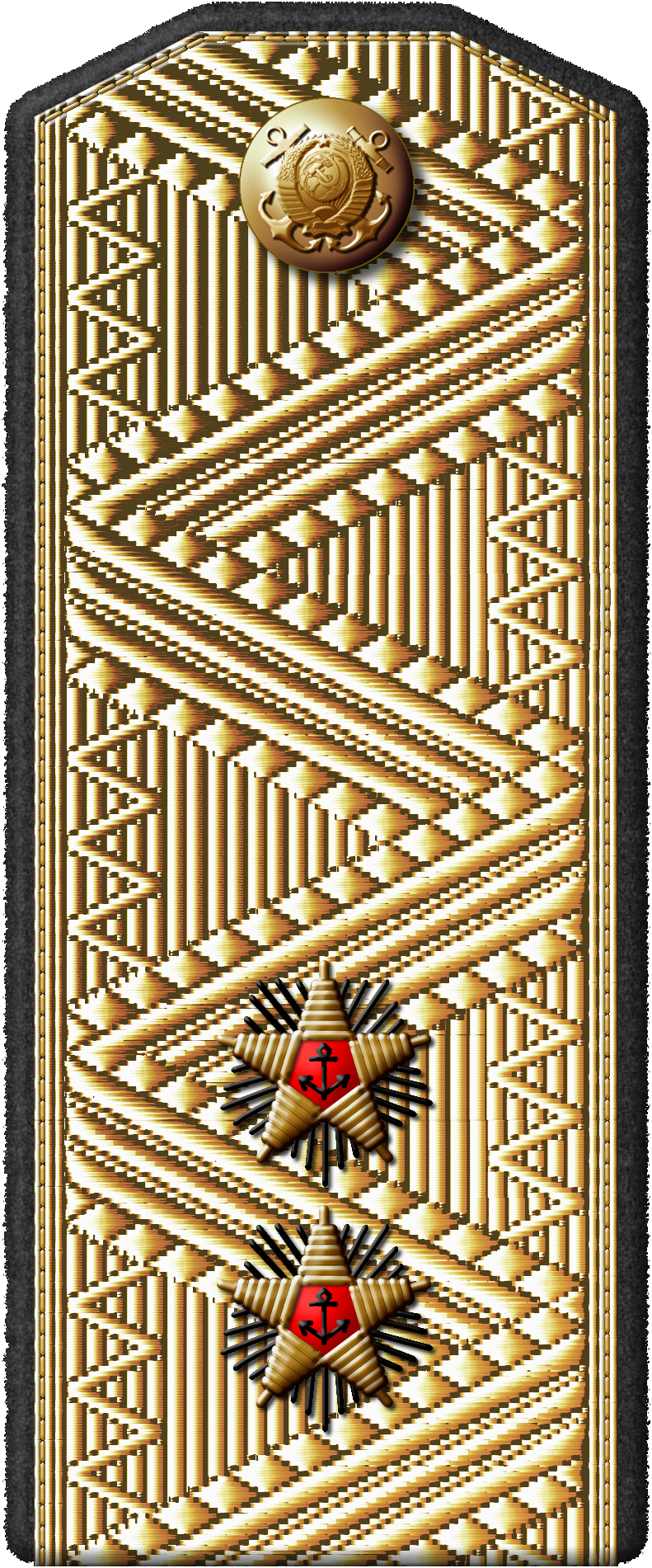
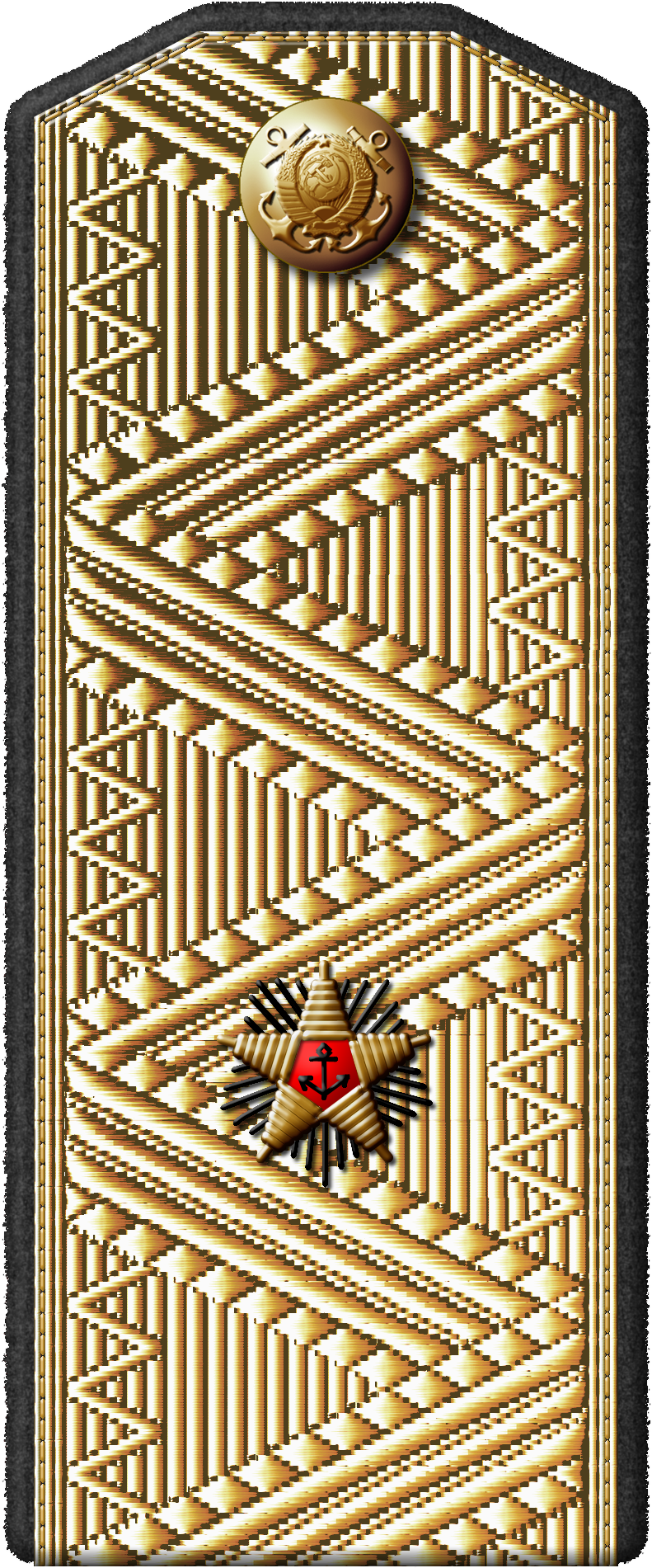
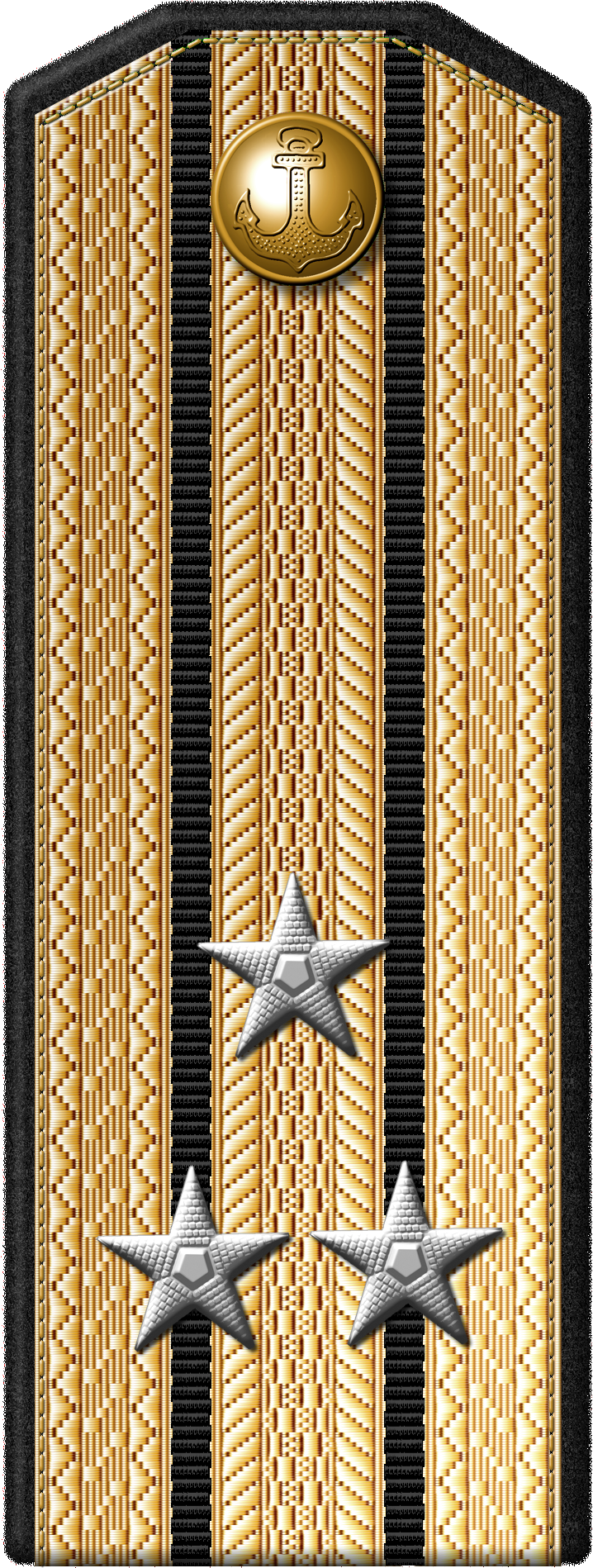
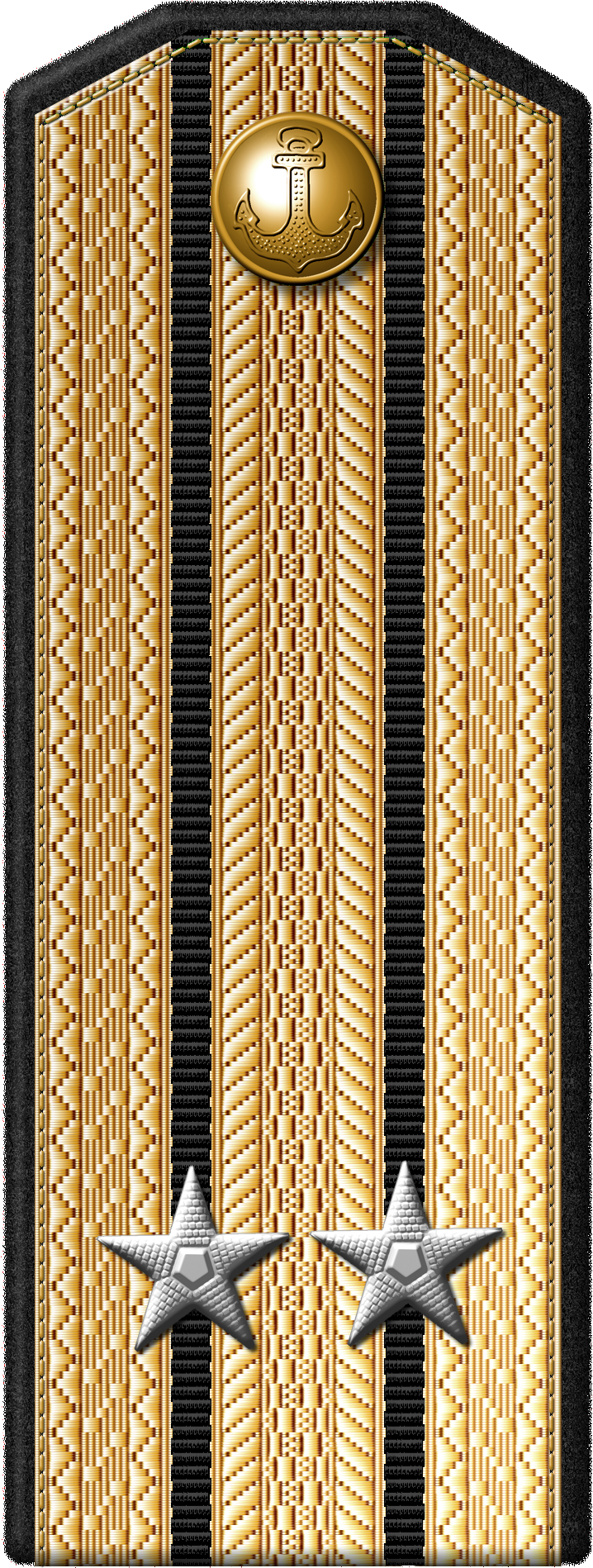
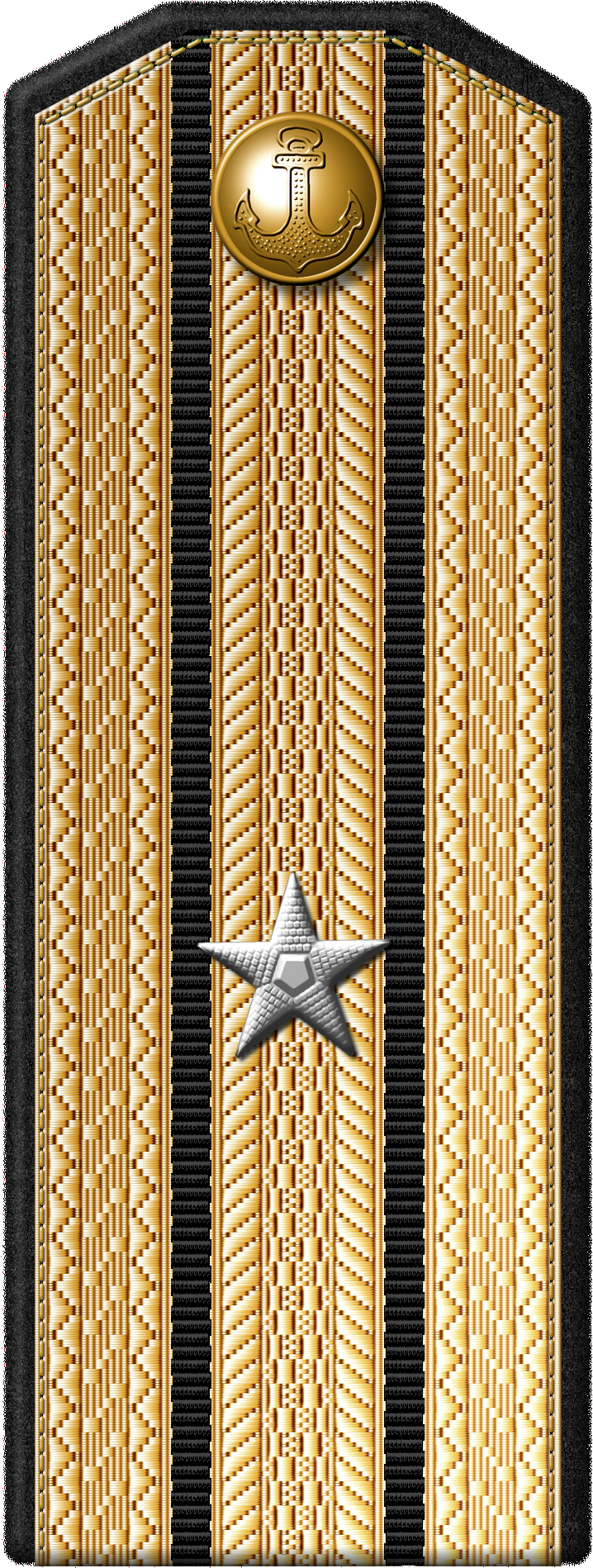
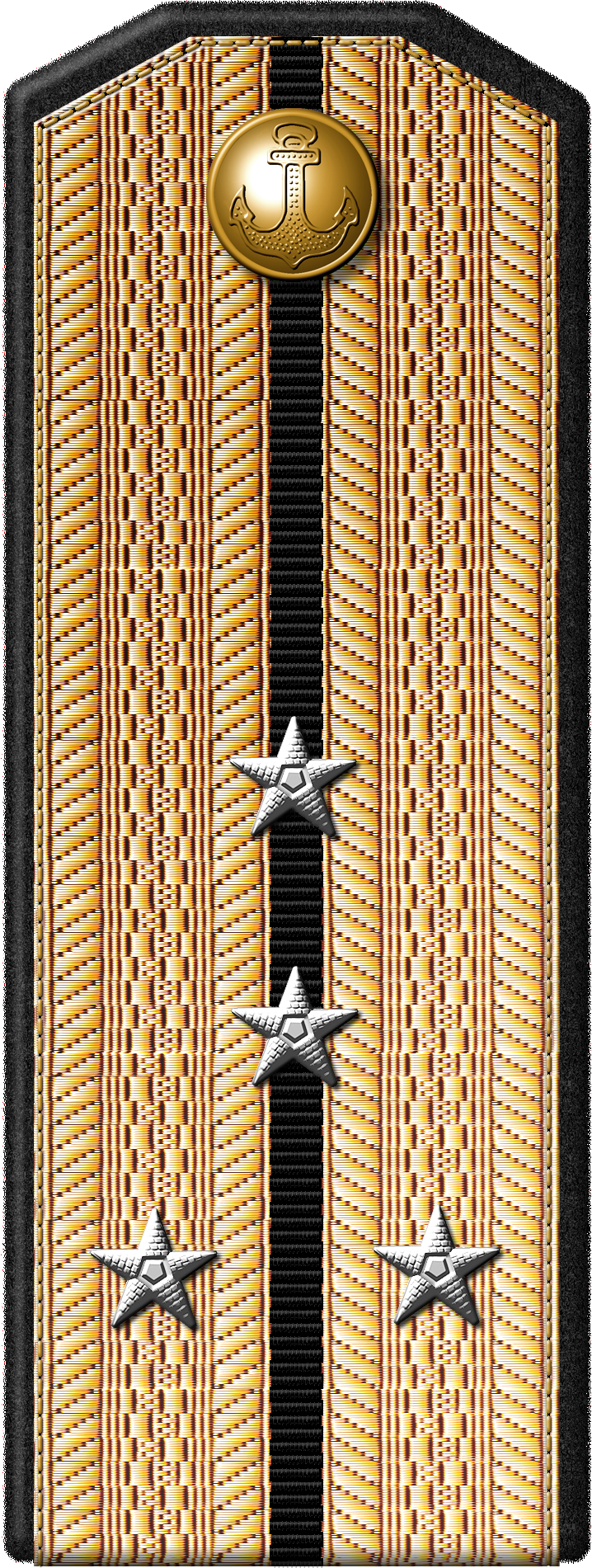
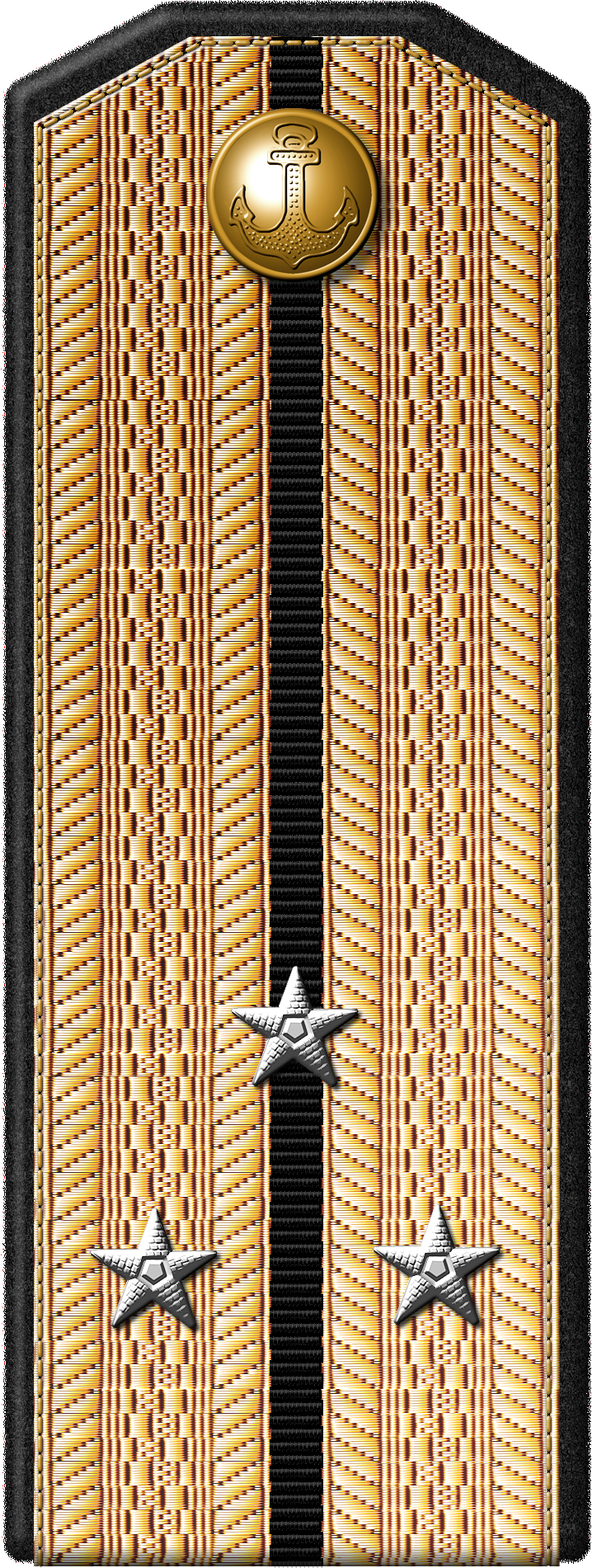
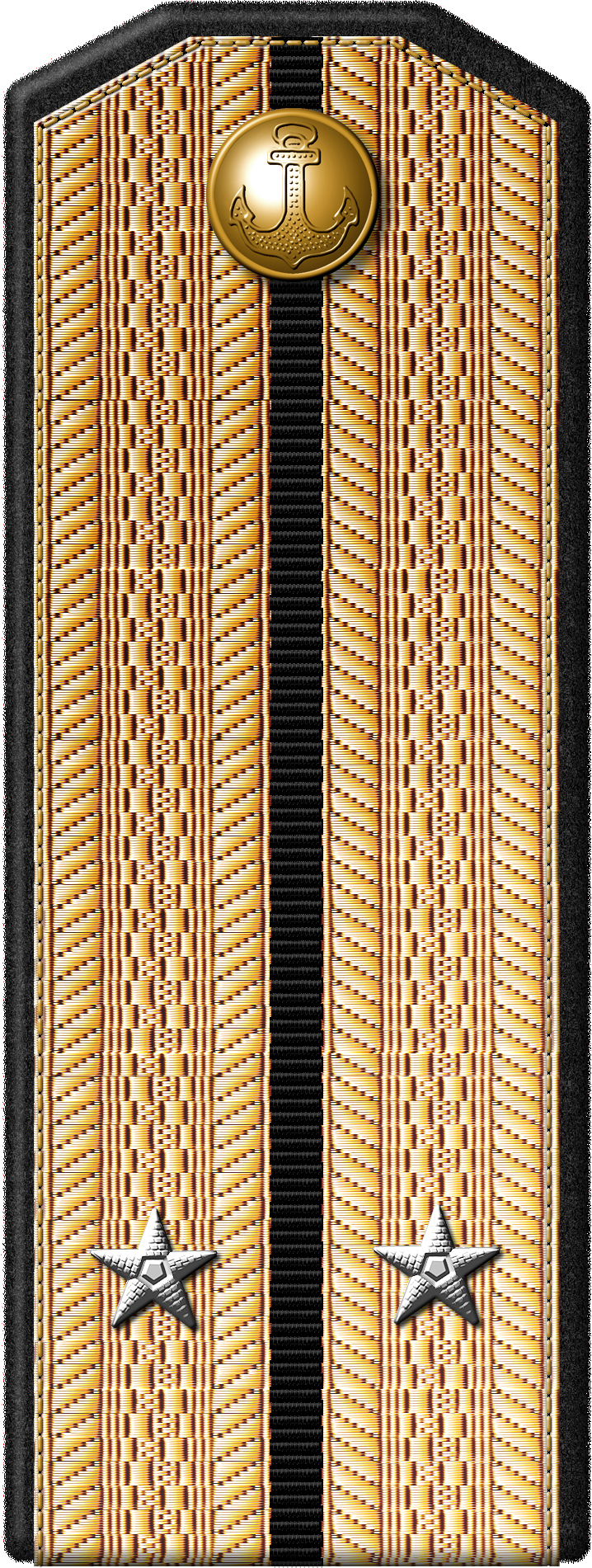
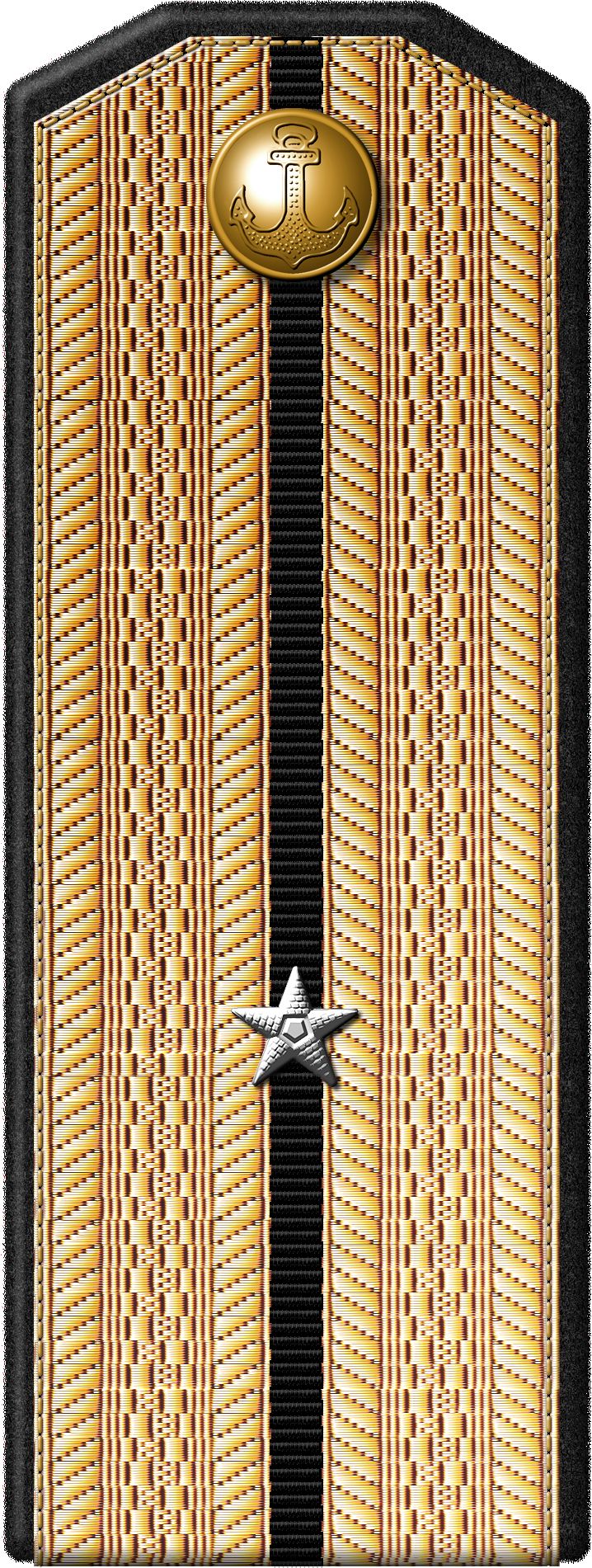
Rank group	General / flag officers							Senior officers					Junior officers
British Army (Note: Same insignia used by all militaries of the British Empire)
British Army	Field marshal		General		Lieutenant-general	Major-general	Brigadier (Note: An appointment rather than a substantive rank)	Colonel		Lieutenant-colonel	Major		Captain		Lieutenant		Second lieutenant
Royal Air Force
Royal Air Force	Marshal of the RAF		Air chief marshal		Air marshal	Air vice-marshal	Air commodore	Group captain		Wing commander	Squadron leader		Flight lieutenant		Flying officer		Pilot officer/ Acting pilot officer
Royal Navy
Royal Navy	Admiral of the Fleet		Admiral		Vice-admiral	Rear-admiral	Commodore	Captain		Commander	Lieutenant commander		Lieutenant		Sub lieutenant		Midshipman
Rank group	General / flag officers							Senior officers					Junior officers
Belgian Army & Military Aviation
Belgian Army & Military Aviation					Luitenant-generaal	Generaal-majoor		Kolonel		Luitenant-kolonel	Majoor		Kapitein-commandant	Kapitein	Luitenant		Onderluitenant
Belgian Naval Corps
Belgian Naval Corps								Kolonel		Luitenant-kolonel	Majoor		Kapitein-commandant	Kapitein	Luitenant		Onderluitenant
Rank group	General / flag officers							Senior officers					Junior officers
(Tsardom of Bulgaria (1908–1946)) Royal Bulgarian Army & Air Force
(Tsardom of Bulgaria (1908–1946)) Royal Bulgarian Army & Air Force			Генерал-полковник; General-pukovnik		Генерал-лейтенант; General-leytenant	Генерал-майор; General-mayor		Полковник; Polkovnik		Подполковник; Podpolkovnik	Майор; Mayor		Капитан; Kapitan		Старши лейтенант Starshi leytenant	Лейтенант; Leytenant	Офицерски кандидатъ Ofitserski kandidat
Royal Bulgarian Navy
Royal Bulgarian Navy			Адмирал; Admiral		Вицеадмирал; Vitseadmiral	Контраадмирал; Kontraadmiral		Капитан I ранг Kapitan I rang		Капитан II ранг Kapitan II rang	Капитан III ранг Kapitan III rang		Лейтенант; Leytenant		Мичман I ранг Michman I rang	Мичман II ранг Michman II rang	Офицерски кандидатъ Ofitserski kandidat
Rank group	General / flag officers							Senior officers					Junior officers
Republic of China National Army
Republic of China National Army	特級上將; Teji shangjiang		一級上將; Yījí shàngjiàng	二級上將; Èrjí shàngjiàng	中將; Zhōngjiàng	少將; Shàojiàng		上校; Shàngxiào		中校; Zhōngxiào	少校; Shàoxiào		上尉; Shàngwèi		中尉; Zhōngwèi	少尉; Shàowèi	准尉; Zhunwei
Republic of China Air Force
Republic of China Air Force					中將; Zhōngjiàng	少將; Shàojiàng		上校; Shàngxiào		中校; Zhōngxiào	少校; Shàoxiào		上尉; Shàngwèi		中尉; Zhōngwèi	少尉; Shàowèi
(Taiwan) Republic of China Navy
(Taiwan) Republic of China Navy			一級上將; Yījí shàngjiàng	二級上將; Èrjí shàngjiàng	中將; Zhōngjiàng	少將; Shàojiàng	代將; Dàijiàng	上校; Shàngxiào		中校; Zhōngxiào	少校; Shàoxiào		上尉; Shàngwèi		中尉; Zhōngwèi	少尉; Shàowèi
Rank group	General / flag officers							Senior officers					Junior officers
Czechoslovak Army
Czechoslovak Army					Armádní generál	Divisní generál	Brigádní generál	Plukovník		Podplukovník	Major	Štábní kapitán	Kapitán		Nadporučík	Poručík	Podporučík
Rank group	General / flag officers							Senior officers					Junior officers
Royal Danish Army
Royal Danish Army			General		Generalløjtnant	Generalmajor		Oberst		Oberstløjtnant			Kaptajn	Kaptajnløjtnant	Premierløjtnant	Løjtnant	Sekondløjtnant
Royal Danish Navy
Royal Danish Navy			Admiral		Viceadmiral	Kontreadmiral		Kommandør		Kommandørkaptajn			Orlogskaptajn	Kaptajnløjtnant	Søløjtnant I	Løjtnant	Søløjtnant II
Rank group	General / flag officers							Senior officers					Junior officers
(Finland) Finnish Army & Air Force
(Finland) Finnish Army & Air Force	Sotamarsalkka; Fältmarskalk		Kenraali; General		Kenraaliluutnantti; Generallöjtnant	Kenraalimajuri; Generalmajor		Eversti; Överste		Everstiluutnantti; Överstelöjtnant	Majuri; Major		Kapteeni; Kapten		Luutnantti; Löjtnant		Vänrikki; Fänrik
Finnish Navy
Finnish Navy			Amiraali; Amiral		Vara-amiraali; Viceamiral	Kontra-amiraali; Konteramiral		Kommodori; Kommodor		Komentaja; Kommendör	Komentajakapteeni; Kommendörkapten		Kapteeniluutnantti; Kaptenlöjtnant		Luutnantti; Löjtnant		Aliluutnantti; Underlöjtnant
Rank group	General / flag officers							Senior officers					Junior officers
(France) French Army
(France) French Army	Maréchal de France		Général d'armée		Général de corps d'armée	Général de division	Général de brigade	Colonel		Lieutenant-colonel	Commandant		Capitaine		Lieutenant		Sous-lieutenant
(France) French Air Force
(France) French Air Force			Général d'armée aérienne		Général de corps aérien	Général de division aérienne	Général de brigade aérienne	Colonel		Lieutenant-colonel	Commandant		Capitaine		Lieutenant		Sous-lieutenant
French Navy
French Navy	Amiral de France	Amiral de la Flotte	Amiral		Vice-amiral d'escadre	Vice-amiral	Contre-amiral	Capitaine de vaisseau		Capitaine de frégate	Capitaine de corvette		Lieutenant de vaisseau		Enseigne de vaisseau de 1^{re} classe		Enseigne de vaisseau de 2^{e} classe
Rank group	General / flag officers							Senior officers					Junior officers
German Army & Luftwaffe	Reichsmarschall
German Army & Luftwaffe	Reichsmarschall	Generalfeldmarschall	Generaloberst		General der Waffengattung	Generalleutnant	Generalmajor	Oberst		Oberstleutnant	Major		Hauptmann		Oberleutnant		Leutnant
Kriegsmarine	Reichsmarschall
Kriegsmarine	Reichsmarschall	Großadmiral	Generaladmiral		Admiral	Vizeadmiral	Konteradmiral	Kommodore	Kapitän zur See	Fregattenkapitän	Korvettenkapitän		Kapitänleutnant		Oberleutnant zur See		Leutnant zur See
Rank group	General / flag officers							Senior officers					Junior officers
Hellenic Army
Hellenic Army	Στρατάρχης; Stratarches		Στρατηγός; Stratigos		Ἀντιστράτηγος; Antistratigos	Ὑποστράτηγος; Ypostratigos		Συνταγματάρχης; Syntagmatarchis		Ἀντισυνταγματάρχης; Antisyntagmatarchis	Ταγματάρχης; Tagmatarchis		Λοχαγός; Lochagos		Ὑπολοχαγός; Ypolochagos		Ἀνθυπολοχαγός; Anthypolochagos
Royal Hellenic Air Force
Royal Hellenic Air Force	Ἀρχιπτέραρχος; Archiptérarchos		Πτέραρχος; Ptérarchos		Ἀντιπτέραρχος; Antiptérarchos	Ὑποπτέραρχος; Ypoptérarchos		Σμήναρχος; Smínarchos		Ἀντισμήναρχος; Antismínarchos	Ἐπισμηναγός; Episminagós		Σμηναγός; Sminagós		Ὑποσμηναγός; Yposminagós		Ἀνθυποσμηναγός; Anthyposminagós
Royal Hellenic Navy
Royal Hellenic Navy	Ἀρχιναύαρχος; Archinavarchos		Ναύαρχος; Navarchos		Ἀντιναύαρχος; Antinavarchos	Ὑποναύαρχος; Yponavarchos		Πλοίαρχος; Ploiarchos		Ἀντιπλοίαρχος; Antiploiarchos	Πλωτάρχης; Plotarchis		Ὑποπλοίαρχος; Ypoploiarchos		Ἀνθυποπλοίαρχος; Anthypoploiarchos		Σημαιοφόρος; Simaioforos
Rank group	General / flag officers							Senior officers					Junior officers
Royal Hungarian Army
Royal Hungarian Army	Tábornagy		Vezérezredes		Altábornagy	Vezérőrnagy		Ezredes		Alezredes	Őrnagy		Százados		Főhadnagy		Hadnagy
Royal Hungarian Air Force
Royal Hungarian Air Force					Altábornagy	Vezérőrnagy		Ezredes		Alezredes	Őrnagy		Százados		Főhadnagy		Hadnagy
Royal Hungarian River Guard
Royal Hungarian River Guard					Vezérfökapitány	Vezérkapitány		Fötörzskapitány		Törzskapitány	Törzsalkapitány		Kapitány		Föhajónagy		Hajónagy
Rank group	General / flag officers							Senior officers					Junior officers
(Italy) Royal Italian Army	Primo maresciallo dell'Impero
(Italy) Royal Italian Army	Primo maresciallo dell'Impero	Maresciallo d'Italia	Generale d'armata	Generale designato d'armata	Generale di corpo d'armata	Generale di divisione	Generale di brigata	Colonnello comandante	Colonnello	Tenente colonnello	Maggiore		Primo capitano	Capitano	Primo tenente	Tenente	Sottotenente
(Italy) Royal Italian Air Force	Primo maresciallo dell'Impero
(Italy) Royal Italian Air Force	Primo maresciallo dell'Impero	Maresciallo dell'Aria	Generale d'Armata Aerea	Generale designato d'Armata Aerea	Generale di Squadra Aerea	Generale di Divisione Aerea	Generale di Brigata Aerea	Colonnello		Tenente colonnello	Maggiore		Primo capitano	Capitano		Tenente	Sottotenente
(Italy) Royal Italian Navy	Primo maresciallo dell'Impero
(Italy) Royal Italian Navy	Primo maresciallo dell'Impero	Grande ammiraglio	Ammiraglio d'armata	Ammiraglio designato d'armata	Ammiraglio di squadra	Ammiraglio di divisione	Contrammiraglio	Capitano di vascello		Capitano di fregata	Capitano di corvetta		Primo tenente di vascello	Tenente di vascello		Sottotenente di vascello	Guardiamarina
Rank group	General / flag officers							Senior officers					Junior officers
Imperial Japanese Army & Army Air Service
Imperial Japanese Army & Army Air Service	大元帥陸軍大将; Daigensui-rikugun-taishō		陸軍大将; Rikugun-taishō (Note: Same rank insignia used for the Gensui-rikugun-taishō (元帥陸軍大将), worn with an additional badge.)		陸軍中将; Rikugun-chūjō	陸軍少将; Rikugun-shōshō		陸軍大佐; Rikugun-taisa		陸軍中佐; Rikugun-chūsa	陸軍少佐; Rikugun-shōsa		陸軍大尉; Rikugun-tai-i		陸軍中尉; Rikugun-chūi	陸軍少尉; Rikugun-shōi	准尉; Jun-i
Imperial Japanese Navy
Imperial Japanese Navy	大元帥海軍大将; Daigensui-kaigun-taishō		海軍大将; Kaigun-taishō (Note: Same rank insignia used for the Gensui-kaigun-taishō (元帥海軍大将), worn with an additional badge.)		海軍中将; Kaigun-chūjō	海軍少将; Kaigun-shōshō		海軍大佐; Kaigun-daisa		海軍中佐; Kaigun-chūsa	海軍少佐; Kaigun-shōsa		海軍大尉; Kaigun-dai-i		海軍中尉; Kaigun-chūi	海軍少尉; Kaigun-shōi	兵曹長; Heisōchō
Rank group	General / flag officers							Senior officers					Junior officers
Manchukuo Imperial Army & Air Force
Manchukuo Imperial Army & Air Force	總司令; Zǒng sīlìng		上将; Shàng jiàng		中将; Zhōng jiàng	少将; Shào jiàng		上校; Shàng xiào		中校; Zhōng xiào	少校; Shào xiào		上尉; Shàng wèi		中尉; Zhōng wèi	少尉; Shào wèi	准尉; Zhǔn wèi
Manchukuo Imperial Navy
Manchukuo Imperial Navy	總司令; Zǒng sīlìng		上将; Shàng jiàng		中将; Zhōng jiàng	少将; Shào jiàng		上校; Shàng xiào		中校; Zhōng xiào	少校; Shào xiào		上尉; Shàng wèi		中尉; Zhōng wèi	少尉; Shào wèi
Rank group	General / flag officers							Senior officers					Junior officers
Royal Netherlands Army
Royal Netherlands Army			Generaal		Luitenant-generaal	Generaal-majoor		Kolonel		Luitenant-kolonel	Majoor		Kapitein/ Ritmeester		Eerste luitenant		Tweede luitenant
Royal Netherlands Navy
Royal Netherlands Navy	Admiraal		Luitenant-admiraal		Vice-admiraal	Schout-bij-nacht		Kapitein ter zee		Kapitein-luitenant ter zee	Luitenant ter zee der 1^{ste} klasse		Luitenant ter zee der 2^{de} klasse oudste categorie		Luitenant ter zee der 2^{de} klasse		Luitenant ter zee der 3^{de} klasse
Rank group	General / flag officers							Senior officers					Junior officers
Norwegian Army & Army Air Service
Norwegian Army & Army Air Service			General		Generalløjtnant	Generalmajor		Oberst		Oberstløitnant	Major		Kaptein/ Rittmester		Premierløitnant		Sekondløitnant
Royal Norwegian Navy
Royal Norwegian Navy			Admiral		Viceadmiral	Kontreadmiral		Kommandør		Kommandørkaptein	Kapteinløytnant		Kaptein		Løitnant		Sekundløitnant
Rank group	General / flag officers							Senior officers					Junior officers
(Poland) Polish Army & Air Force	Marszałek Polski
(Poland) Polish Army & Air Force	Marszałek Polski		Generał broni			Generał dywizji	Generał brygady	Pułkownik		Podpułkownik	Major		Kapitan/ Rotmistrz		Porucznik	Podporucznik	Chorąży
Polish Navy	Marszałek Polski
Polish Navy	Marszałek Polski		Admirał			Wiceadmirał	Kontradmirał	Komandor		Komandor porucznik	Komandor podporucznik		Kapitan marynarki		Porucznik marynarki	Podporucznik marynarki
Rank group	General / flag officers							Senior officers					Junior officers
Royal Romanian Army
Royal Romanian Army	Mareșal		General de armată		General de corp de armată	General de divizie	General de brigadă	Colonel		Locotenent-colonel	Maior		Căpitan		Locotenent		Sublocotenent
Royal Romanian Air Force
Royal Romanian Air Force	Mareșal				General inspector	General comandant	General de escadră aeriană	Comandor		Căpitan-comandor	Locotenent-comandor		Căpitan		Locotenent		Sublocotenent
Royal Romanian Navy
Royal Romanian Navy	Mareșal		Amiral		Viceamiral	Contraamiral	Contraamiral de flotilă	Comandor		Căpitan-comandor	Locotenent-comandor		Căpitan		Locotenent		Aspirant
Rank group	General / flag officers							Senior officers					Junior officers
United States Army & Army Air Force
United States Army & Army Air Force	General of the Army		General		Lieutenant general	Major general	Brigadier general	Colonel		Lieutenant colonel	Major		Captain		First lieutenant		Second lieutenant
United States Navy
United States Navy	Fleet admiral		Admiral		Vice admiral	Rear admiral	Commodore (Note: Reintroduced in 1943)	Captain		Commander	Lieutenant commander		Lieutenant		Lieutenant (junior grade)		Ensign
Rank group	General / flag officers							Senior officers					Junior officers
Red Army (Since Oct. 1943) (Note: For ranks used before 1943, see 1935–1940 ranks and 1940–1943 ranks)	Генерали́ссимус Сове́тского Сою́за; Generalíssimus Sovétskogo Soyúza
Red Army (Since Oct. 1943)	Генерали́ссимус Сове́тского Сою́за; Generalíssimus Sovétskogo Soyúza	Ма́ршал Сове́тского Сою́за; Márshal Sovétskogo Soyúza (Note: Chief marshal of the branch awarded to artillery, armored troops, signal troops and engineer officers.)	Генера́л а́рмии Generál ármi'i (Note: Marshal awarded to artillery, armored troops, signal troops and engineer officers.)		Генера́л-полко́вник; Generál-polkóvnik	Генера́л-лейтена́нт; Generál-leytenánt	Генера́л-майо́р; Generál-mayór	Полко́вник; Polkóvnik		Подполко́вник; Podpolkóvnik	Майо́р; Majór		Kапита́н; Kapitán		Старший лейтена́нт Stárshiy leytenánt	Лейтенант; Leytenant	Mла́дший лейтена́нт Mládshiy leytenánt
Red Army Air Force	Генерали́ссимус Сове́тского Сою́за; Generalíssimus Sovétskogo Soyúza
Red Army Air Force	Генерали́ссимус Сове́тского Сою́за; Generalíssimus Sovétskogo Soyúza	Главный маршал авиации Glávnyi márshal aviátzi'i	Маршал авиации Márshal aviátzi'i		Генера́л-полко́вник; Generál-polkóvnik	Генера́л-лейтена́нт; Generál-leytenánt	Генера́л-майо́р; Generál-mayór	Полко́вник; Polkóvnik		Подполко́вник; Podpolkóvnik	Майо́р; Majór		Kапита́н; Kapitán		Старший лейтена́нт Stárshiy leytenánt	Лейтенант; Leytenant	Mла́дший лейтена́нт Mládshiy leytenánt
Soviet Navy	Генерали́ссимус Сове́тского Сою́за; Generalíssimus Sovétskogo Soyúza
Soviet Navy	Генерали́ссимус Сове́тского Сою́за; Generalíssimus Sovétskogo Soyúza		Адмирал флота Admirál flota (Note: Shoulder insignia was changed to a marshal star on 25 May 1945.)		Адмирал; Admirál	Вице-адмирал; Vitse-admirál	Контр-адмирал; Contre-admirál	Капитан 1-го ранга Kapitan 1-go ránga		Капитан 2-го ранга Kapitan 2-go ránga	Капитан 3-го ранга Kapitan 3-go ránga		Капитан-лейтенант; Kapitan-leytenánt		Старший лейтенант Starshey leytenánt	Лейтенант; Leytenánt	Младший лейтенант Mladshiy leytenánt
Rank group	General / flag officers							Senior officers					Junior officers
Royal Yugoslav Army
Royal Yugoslav Army	Бојни војвода Bojni vojvoda		Армијски генерал Armijski general		Дивизијски генерал Divizijski general	Бригадни генерал Brigadni general (Note: Color on the epaulettes and on the sleeve where different depend on branch (see more Corps colors of Royal Yugoslav Armed Forces))		Пуковник; Pukovnik		Потпуковник; Potpukovnik	Мајор; Major		Капетан прве класе Kapetan prve klase		Капетан друге класе Kapetan druge klase	Поручник; Poručnik	Потпоручник; Potporučnik
Royal Yugoslav Air Force
Royal Yugoslav Air Force			Армијски генерал Armijski general		Дивизијски генерал Divizijski general	Бригадни генерал Brigadni general		Пуковник; Pukovnik		Потпуковник; Potpukovnik	Мајор; Major		Капетан прве класе Kapetan prve klase		Капетан друге класе Kapetan druge klase	Поручник; Poručnik	Потпоручник; Potporučnik
Royal Yugoslav Navy
Royal Yugoslav Navy			Адмирал; Admiral		Вицеадмирал; Viceadmiral	Контраадмирал; Kontraadmiral		Капетан бојног брода Kapetan bojnog broda		Капетан фрегате Kapetan fregate	Капетан корвете Kapetan korvete		Поручник бојног брода прве класе Poručnik bojnog broda prve klase		Поручник бојног брода друге класе Poručnik bojnog broda druge klase	Поручник фрегате Poručnik fregate	Поручник корвете Poručnik korvete
Rank group	General / flag officers							Senior officers					Junior officers
(Socialist Federal Republic of Yugoslavia) Yugoslav Partisans (after 1943)
(Socialist Federal Republic of Yugoslavia) Yugoslav Partisans (after 1943)	Maršal Jugoslavije				General-pukovnik	General-lajtant	General-major	Pukovnik		Potpukovnik	Major		Kapetan		Poručnik	Potporučnik	Zastavnik
Rank group	General / flag officers							Senior officers					Junior officers

== See also ==
- Comparative officer ranks of World War I
- Comparative ranks of Nazi Germany
- List of comparative military ranks
