= Kingdom of Greece Army Ranks =

This article contains the rank insignia of the Hellenic Army and the Hellenic Gendarmerie (until 1973).

== Officers ==
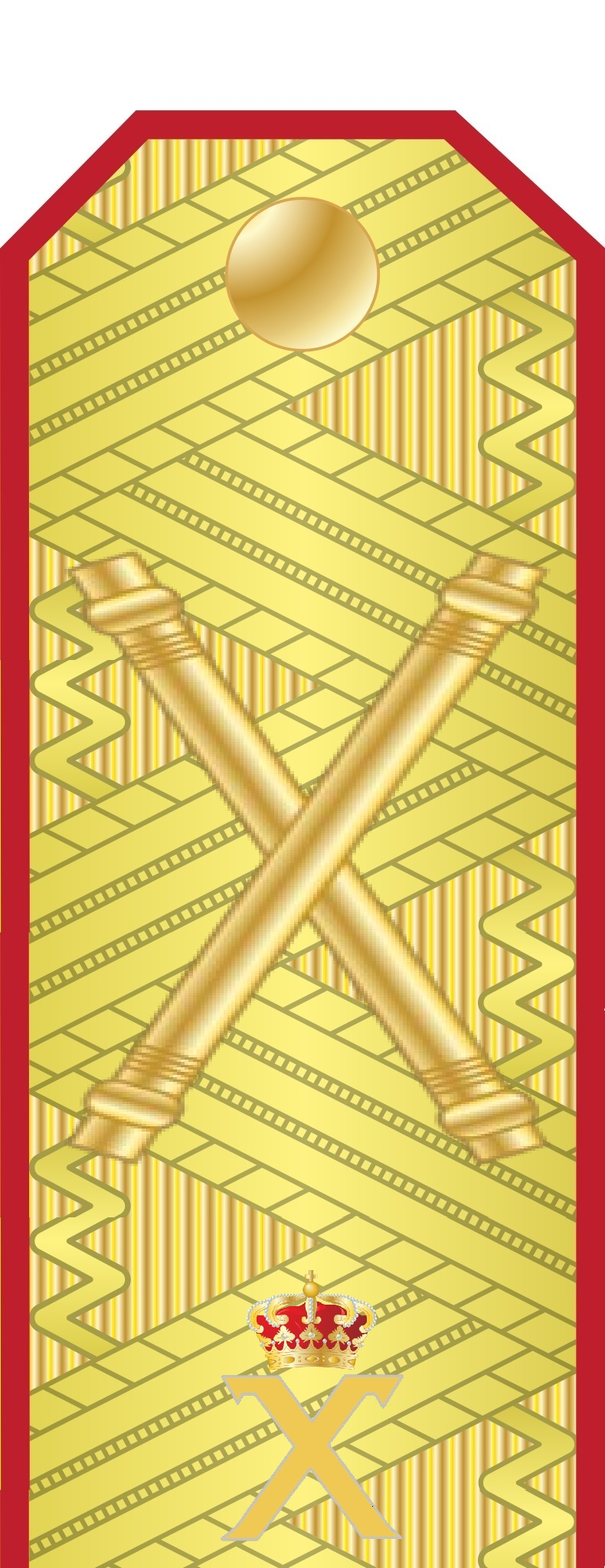
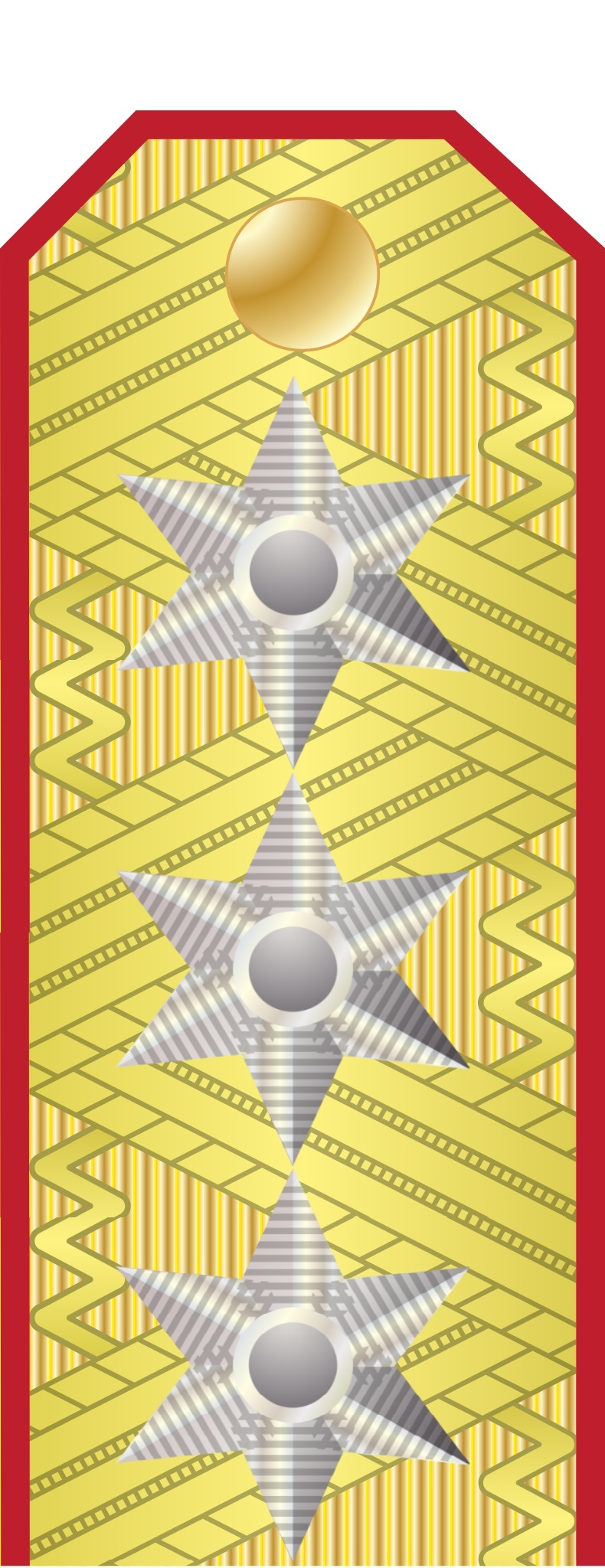
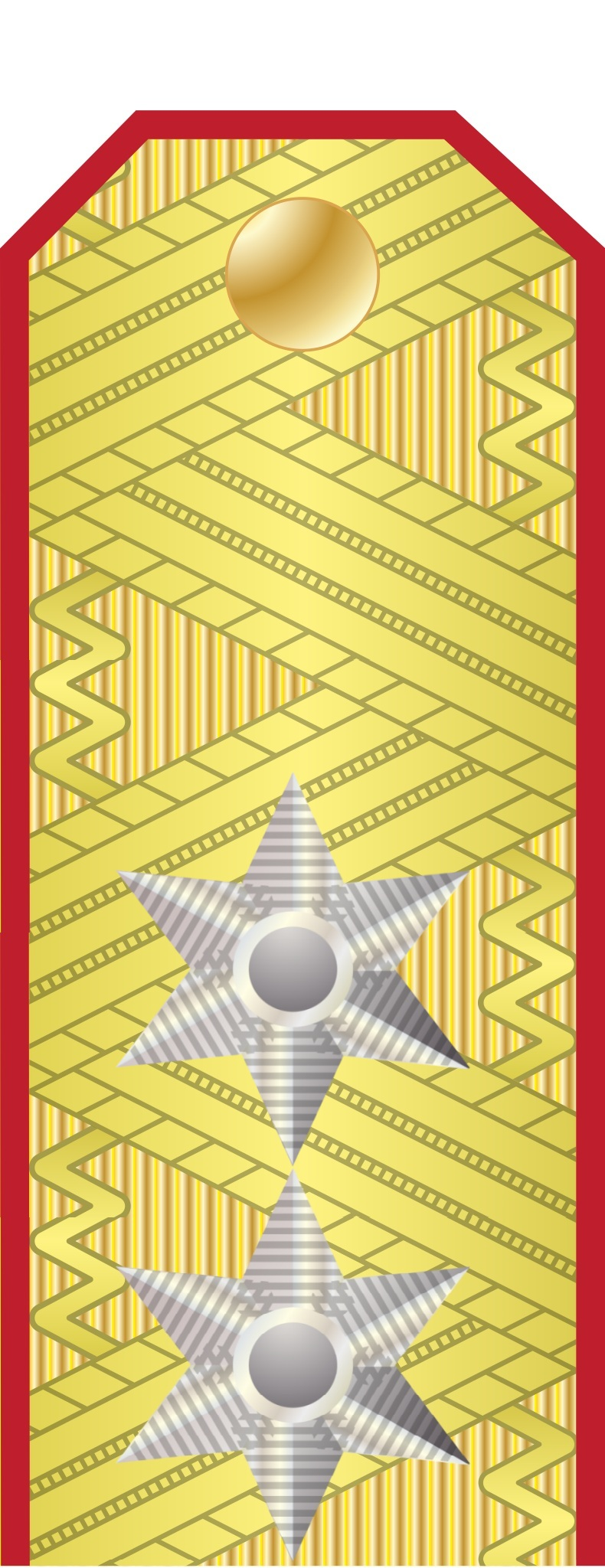
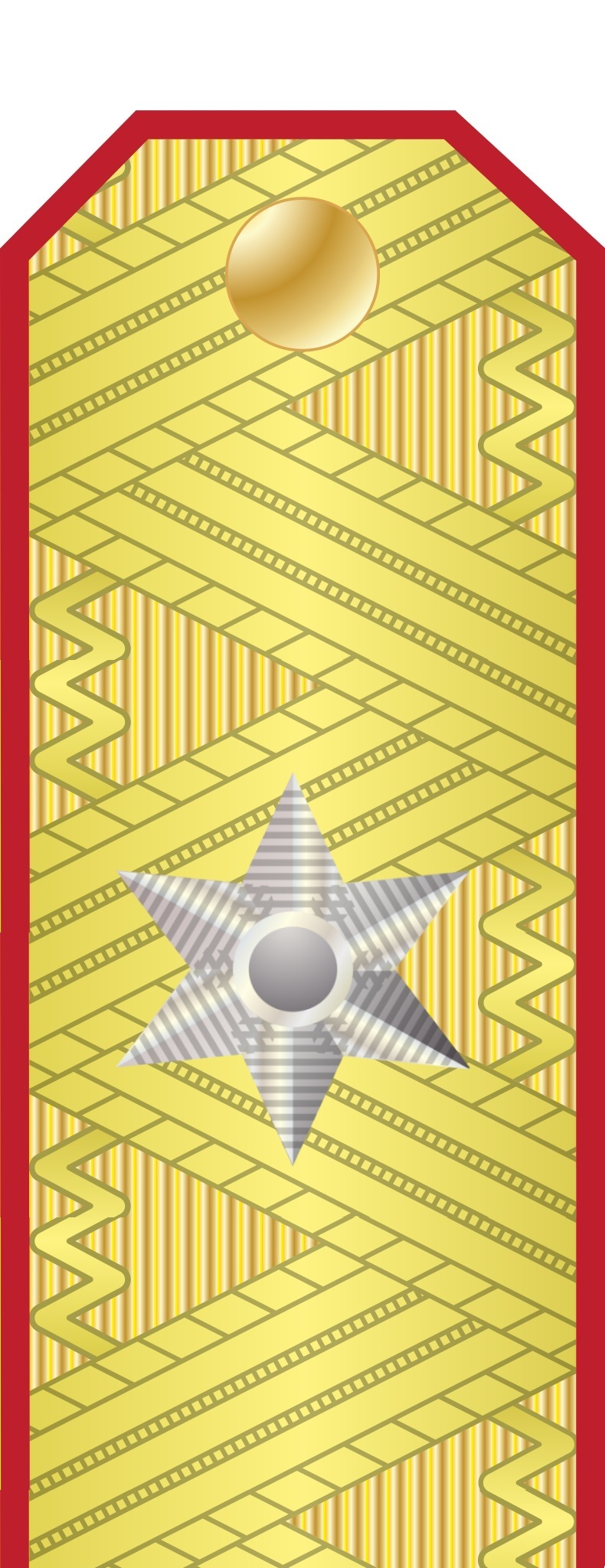
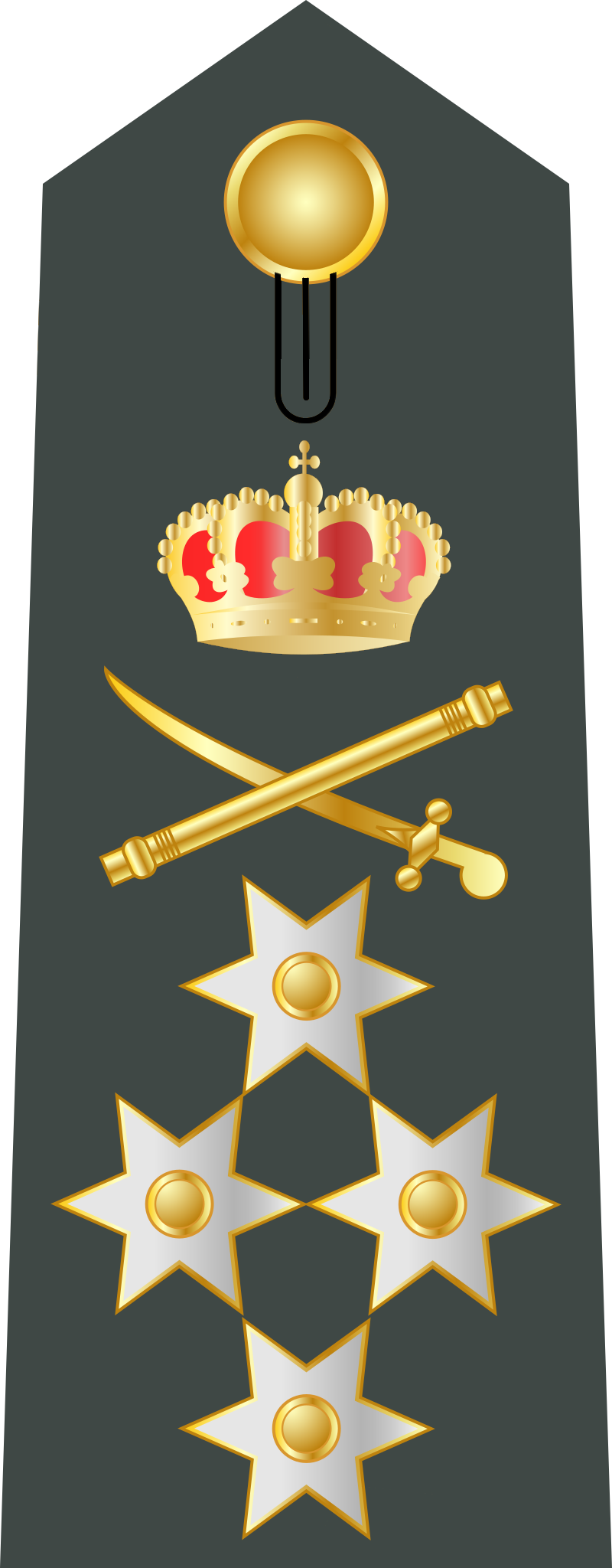
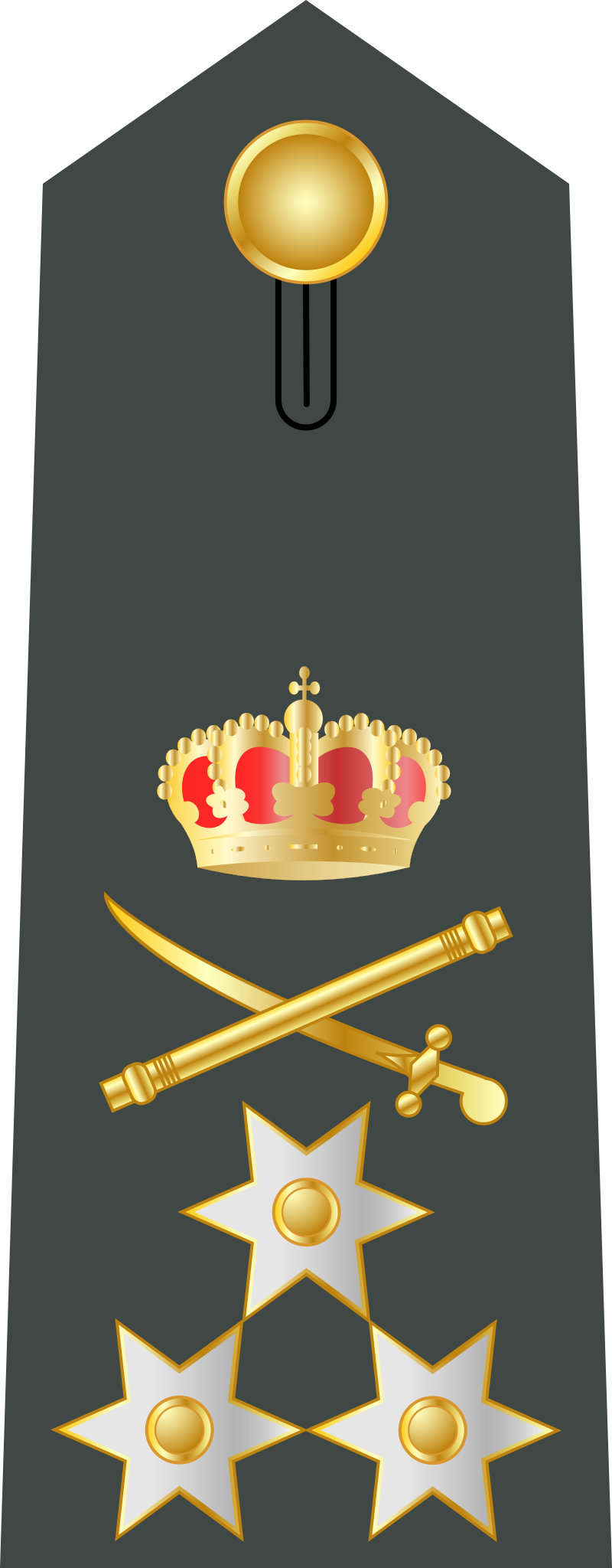
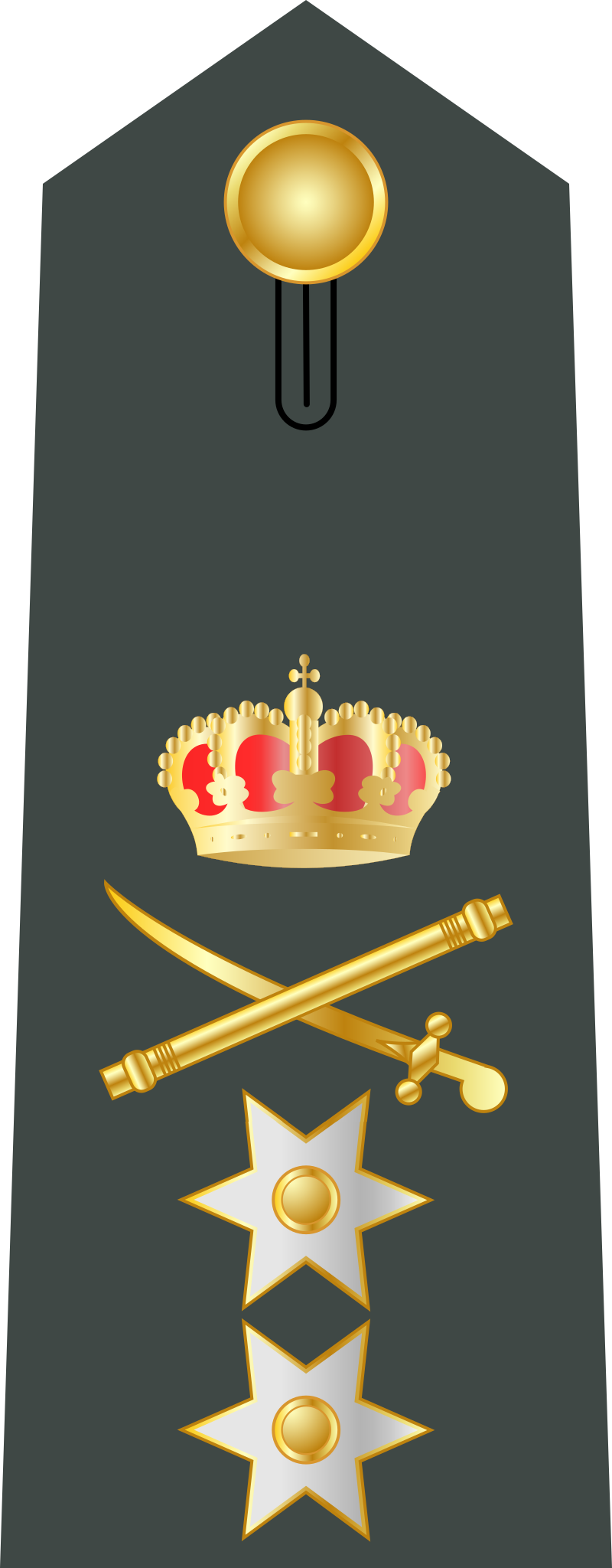
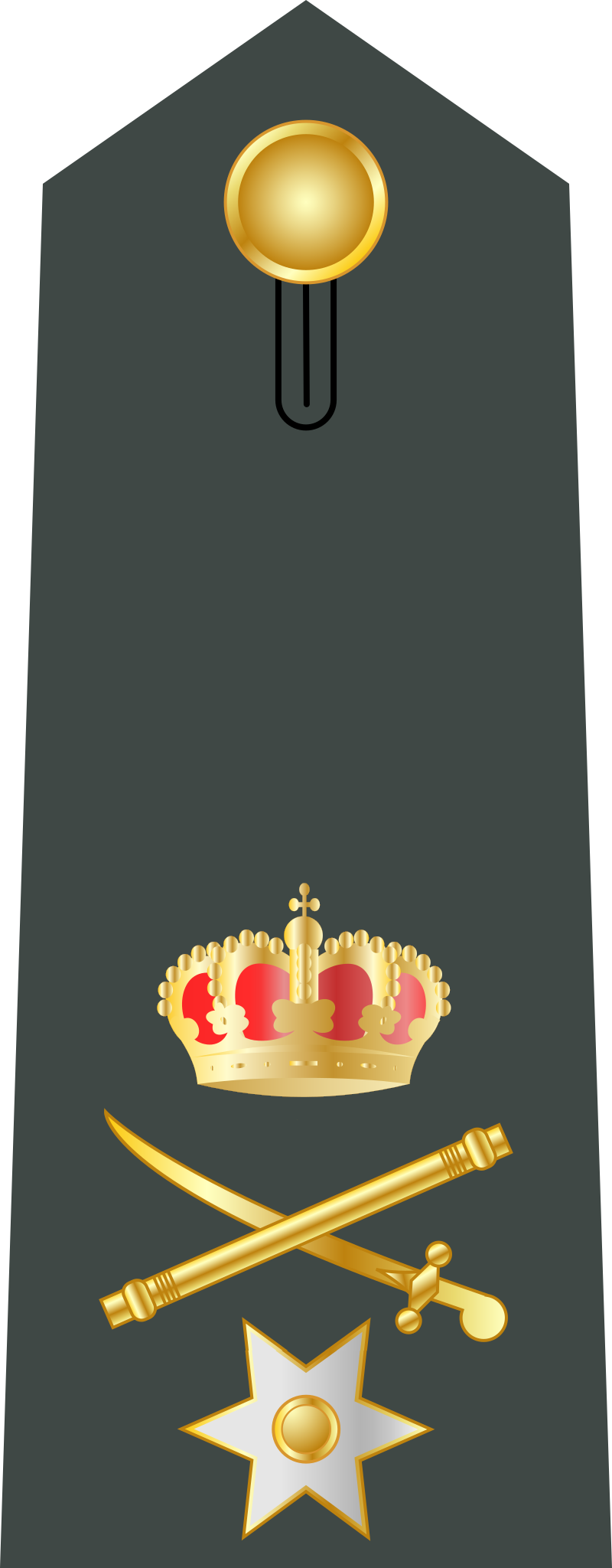
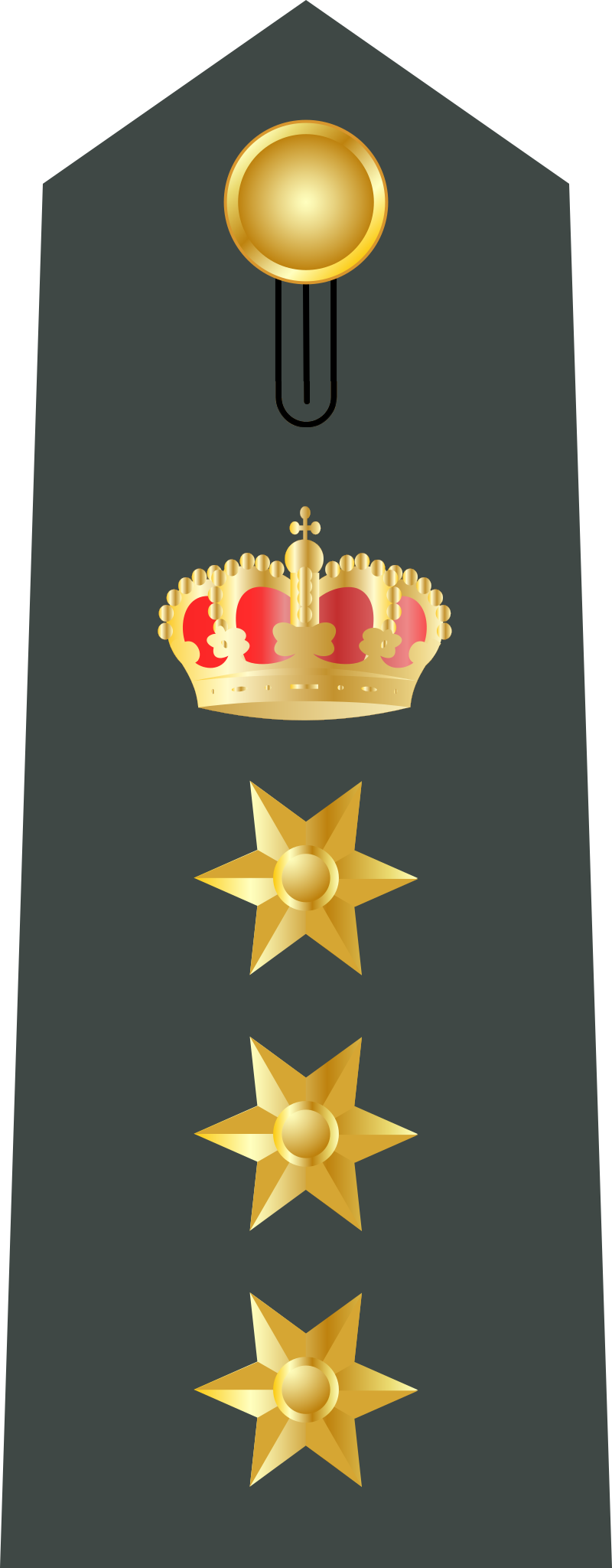
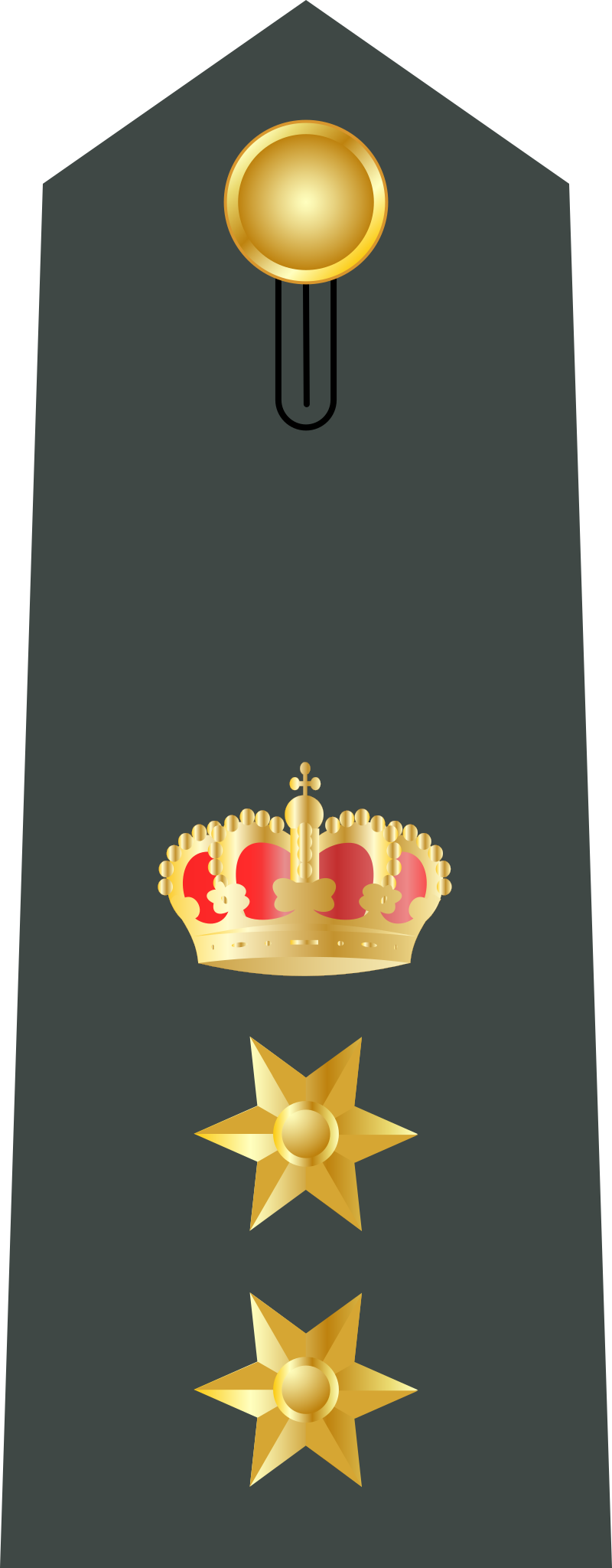
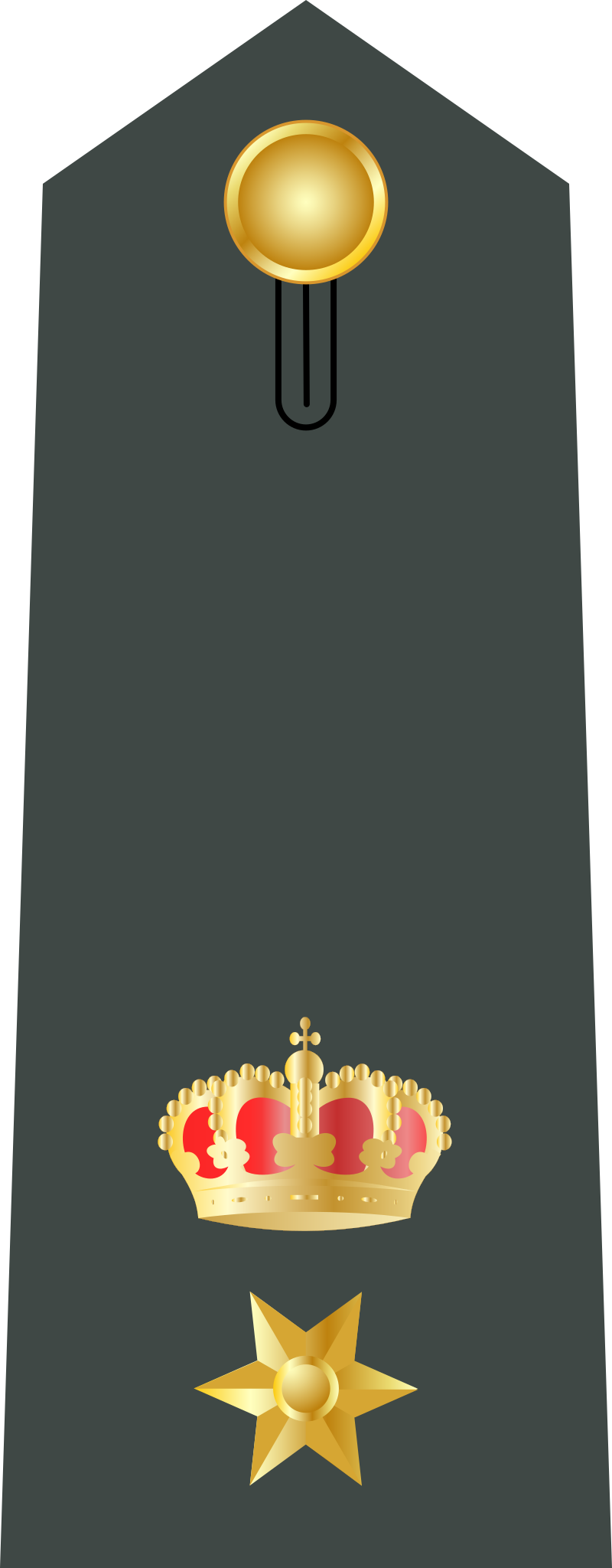
Rank group	General / flag officers					Senior officers				Junior officers
Kingdom of Greece (1829–1868)
Kingdom of Greece (1829–1868)		Στρατηγός; Stratigos	Ἀντιστράτηγος; Antistratigos	Ὑποστράτηγος; Ypostratigos		Συνταγματάρχης; Syntagmatarchis	Ἀντισυνταγματάρχης; Antisyntagmatarchis	Ταγματάρχης; Tagmatarchis	Ὑποταγματάρχης; Ypotagmatarchis	Ἐπιλοχαγός; Epilochagós	Λοχαγός; Lochagos	Πρωθυπολοχαγός; Prothypolochagós (Note: Removed in 1833.)	Ὑπολοχαγός; Ypolochagos	Ἀνθυπολοχαγός; Anthypolochagos
Kingdom of Greece (1868–1908)
Kingdom of Greece (1868–1908)		Στρατηγός; Stratigos	Ἀντιστράτηγος; Antistratigos	Ὑποστράτηγος; Ypostratigos		Συνταγματάρχης; Syntagmatarchis	Ἀντισυνταγματάρχης; Antisyntagmatarchis	Ταγματάρχης; Tagmatarchis		Ἐπιλοχαγός; Epilochagós	Λοχαγός; Lochagos	Ὑπολοχαγός; Ypolochagós		Ἀνθυπολοχαγός; Anthypolochagos
Kingdom of Greece (1908–1937)
Kingdom of Greece (1908–1937)	Στρατάρχης (Note: Created in 1913 for King Constantine I for his leadership during the Balkan Wars.); Stratarches	Στρατηγός; Stratigos	Ἀντιστράτηγος; Antistratigos	Ὑποστράτηγος; Ypostratigos		Συνταγματάρχης; Syntagmatarchis	Ἀντισυνταγματάρχης; Antisyntagmatarchis	Ταγματάρχης; Tagmatarchis		Λοχαγός Α΄ Τάξεως (Note: Removed in 1917.)	Λοχαγός; Lochagos	Ὑπολοχαγός; Ypolochagós		Ἀνθυπολοχαγός; Anthypolochagos
Kingdom of Greece (1937–1945)
Kingdom of Greece (1937–1945)	Στρατάρχης (Note: Field marshal rank was re-introduced for King George II in 1939, and borne by his successors. It was only awarded once to a career officer: Alexandros Papagos (1883–1955) in 1949. The version illustrated here is that of Paul (r. 1947–1964), with the royal cypher of his brother, George II.); Stratarches	Στρατηγός; Stratigos	Ἀντιστράτηγος; Antistratigos	Ὑποστράτηγος; Ypostratigos		Συνταγματάρχης; Syntagmatarchis	Ἀντισυνταγματάρχης; Antisyntagmatarchis	Ταγματάρχης; Tagmatarchis		Λοχαγός; Lochagos		Ὑπολοχαγός; Ypolochagós		Ἀνθυπολοχαγός; Anthypolochagos
Kingdom of Greece (1946–1959)
Kingdom of Greece (1946–1959)	Στρατάρχης; Stratarches	Στρατηγός; Stratigos	Ἀντιστράτηγος; Antistratigos	Ὑποστράτηγος; Ypostratigos	Ταξίαρχος; Taxiarchos	Συνταγματάρχης; Syntagmatarchis	Ἀντισυνταγματάρχης; Antisyntagmatarchis	Ταγματάρχης; Tagmatarchis		Λοχαγός; Lochagos		Ὑπολοχαγός; Ypolochagós		Ἀνθυπολοχαγός; Anthypolochagos
Kingdom of Greece (1959–1970)
Kingdom of Greece (1959–1970)	Στρατάρχης (Note: Field marshal rank was used by the reigning King of Greece.); Stratarches	Στρατηγός; Stratigos	Ἀντιστράτηγος; Antistratigos	Ὑποστράτηγος; Ypostratigos	Ταξίαρχος; Taxiarchos	Συνταγματάρχης; Syntagmatarchis	Ἀντισυνταγματάρχης; Antisyntagmatarchis	Ταγματάρχης; Tagmatarchis		Λοχαγός; Lochagos		Ὑπολοχαγός; Ypolochagós		Ἀνθυπολοχαγός; Anthypolochagos
Kingdom of Greece (1970–1973)
Kingdom of Greece (1970–1973)	Στρατάρχης (Note: Field marshal rank nominally retained, actually dormant following King Constantine's flight after the 1967 countercoup.); Stratarches	Στρατηγός; Stratigos	Ἀντιστράτηγος; Antistratigos	Ὑποστράτηγος; Ypostratigos	Ταξίαρχος; Taxiarchos	Συνταγματάρχης; Syntagmatarchis	Ἀντισυνταγματάρχης; Antisyntagmatarchis	Ταγματάρχης; Tagmatarchis		Λοχαγός; Lochagos		Ὑπολοχαγός; Ypolochagós		Ἀνθυπολοχαγός; Anthypolochagos
Rank group	General / flag officers					Senior officers				Junior officers

== Other ranks ==
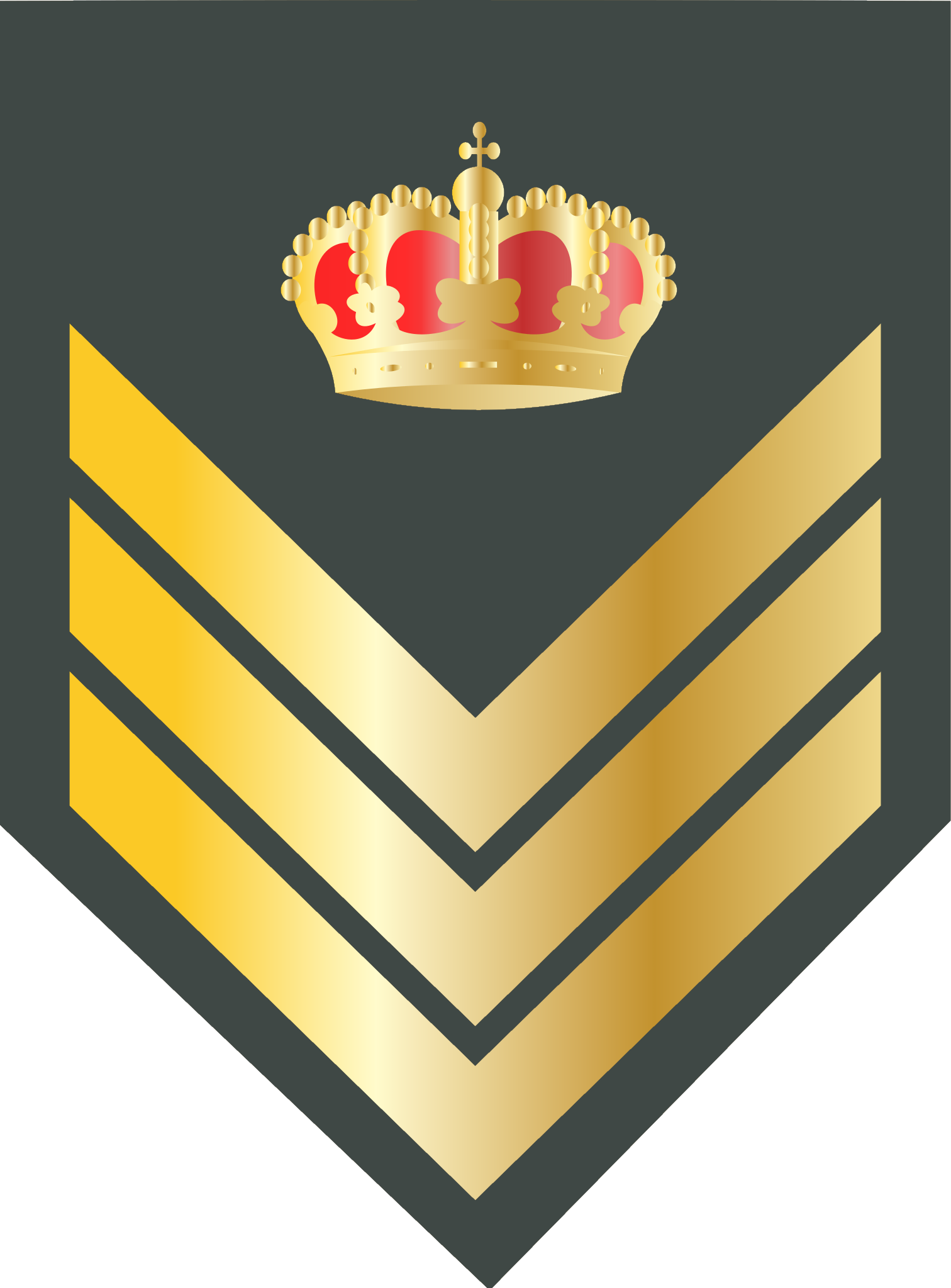
Rank group	Senior NCOs				Junior NCOs	Enlisted
Kingdom of Greece (1829–1868)						No insignia
Kingdom of Greece (1829–1868)	Ἀνθυπασπιστής; Anthypaspistís	Ἐπιλοχίας; Epilochías	Λοχίας; Lochías	Δεκανέας; Dekanéas	Ὑποδεκανέας; Ypodekanéas	Στρατιώτης; Stratiótis
Kingdom of Greece (1868–1924)						No insignia
Kingdom of Greece (1868–1924)	Ἀνθυπασπιστής; Anthypaspistís	Ἐπιλοχίας; Epilochías	Λοχίας; Lochías	Δεκανέας; Dekanéas	Ὑποδεκανέας; Ypodekanéas	Στρατιώτης; Stratiótis
Kingdom of Greece (1912–1916)						No insignia
Kingdom of Greece (1912–1916)	Ἀνθυπασπιστής; Anthypaspistís	Ἐπιλοχίας; Epilochías	Λοχίας; Lochías	Δεκανέας; Dekanéas	Ὑποδεκανέας; Ypodekanéas	Στρατιώτης; Stratiótis
Kingdom of Greece (1916–1924)						No insignia
Kingdom of Greece (1916–1924)	Ἀνθυπασπιστής; Anthypaspistís	Ἐπιλοχίας; Epilochías	Λοχίας; Lochías	Δεκανέας; Dekanéas	Ὑποδεκανέας; Ypodekanéas	Στρατιώτης; Stratiótis
Kingdom of Greece (1954–1960)	(in white font)	(Greek crown; gold for career NCOs, volunteers in yellow, conscripts as displayed)	(volunteer in yellow, career NCO in gold) (conscript)	(volunteer in yellow, career NCO in gold) (conscript)	(volunteer in yellow, career NCO in gold) (conscript)	No insignia
Kingdom of Greece (1954–1960)	Ἀνθυπασπιστής; Anthypaspistís	Ἐπιλοχίας; Epilochías	Λοχίας; Lochías	Δεκανέας; Dekanéas	Υποδεκανέας; Ypodekanéas	Στρατιώτης; Stratiótis
Kingdom of Greece (1960 –1968)						No insignia
Kingdom of Greece (1960 –1968)	Ἀνθυπασπιστής; Anthypaspistís	Ἐπιλοχίας; Epilochías	Λοχίας Α΄ Lochías Á	Λοχίας Β΄ Lochías B́	Δεκανέας; Dekanéas	Στρατιώτης; Stratiótis
Kingdom of Greece (1968–1973)						No insignia
Kingdom of Greece (1968–1973)	Ἀνθυπασπιστής; Anthypaspistís	Ἀρχιλοχίας; Archilochías	Ἐπιλοχίας; Epilochías	Λοχίας; Lochías	Δεκανέας; Dekanéas	Στρατιώτης; Stratiótis
Rank group	Senior NCOs				Junior NCOs	Enlisted

=== Reserve NCO candidate insignia ===
Candidate Corporal (Ypopsifios Dekaneas) insignia

== Royal Guard insignia ==
Royal Guard (Evzones) insignia during Paul's reign

1947–1964

== See also ==
- Hellenic Army officer rank insignia
- Hellenic Army Other Ranks rank insignia
- Ranks and insignia of NATO Armies
- Comparative military ranks of World War I
- Comparative military ranks of World War II
- Comparative military ranks
