= Greek military ranks =

Modern Greek military ranks are based on Ancient Greek and Byzantine terminology.

In the army and air force, these names are often based on the unit or post that a holder of each rank usual commands. For example, a tagmatarchis is in charge of a tagma, which is derived from an Ancient Greek word translatable as "command", "order", or "class", and in modern Greek is a unit equivalent to a battalion in other armies; hence a modern tagmatarchis is a rank equivalent to major in other armies. Similarly, a lochagos normally commands a lochos (a word that originally meant "warband"), which in Ancient Greece was a 100-strong hoplite unit, but in modern Greek usage is equivalent to an infantry company. Hence a lochagos is the equivalent of a captain in other armies, and the modern Greek equivalent of an army first lieutenant is the modern neologism ypolochagos: literally, "sub-captain". Likewise, the modern Greek equivalent of a sergeant is a lochias.

The suffixes -agos and -archos (or -arches), which are often found in Greek rank names, are derived from the roots agein "to lead" and archein "to rule", respectively.

== Officers ==
Officer ranks in the Army retain the style introduced in 1970, with the flaming grenade replacing (since 1975) the phoenix introduced by the Regime of the Colonels in 1973. Navy officer ranks retain the structure introduced in 1936. The Hellenic Air Force, is the youngest of the three services (founded in 1930). Its insignia are based on the British Royal Air Force, while it uses Army rank titles when translated to English.

NATO code	OF-10	OF-9	OF-8	OF-7	OF-6	OF-5	OF-4	OF-3	OF-2	OF-1
Hellenic Army
Hellenic Army		Στρατηγός; Stratigos	Αντιστράτηγος; Antistratigos	Υποστράτηγος; Ypostratigos	Ταξίαρχος; Taxiarchos	Συνταγματάρχης; Syntagmatarchis	Αντισυνταγματάρχης; Antisyntagmatarchis	Ταγματάρχης; Tagmatarchis	Λοχαγός; Lochagos	Υπολοχαγός; Ypolochagos	Ανθυπολοχαγός; Anthypolochagos
Hellenic Navy
Hellenic Navy		Ναύαρχος; Navarchos	Αντιναύαρχος; Antinavarchos	Υποναύαρχος; Yponavarchos	Αρχιπλοίαρχος; Archiploiarchos	Πλοίαρχος; Ploiarchos	Αντιπλοίαρχος; Antiploiarchos	Πλωτάρχης; Plotarchis	Υποπλοίαρχος; Ypoploiarchos	Ανθυποπλοίαρχος; Anthypoploiarchos	Σημαιοφόρος; Simaioforos
Hellenic Air Force
Hellenic Air Force		Πτέραρχος; Pterarchos	Αντιπτέραρχος; Antipterarchos	Υποπτέραρχος; Ypopterarchos	Ταξίαρχος; Taxiarchos	Σμήναρχος; Sminarchos	Αντισμήναρχος; Antisminarchos	Επισμηναγός; Episminagos	Σμηναγός; Sminagos	Υποσμηναγός; Yposminagos	Ανθυποσμηναγός; Anthyposminagos
NATO code	OF-10	OF-9	OF-8	OF-7	OF-6	OF-5	OF-4	OF-3	OF-2	OF-1

== NCO and other ranks ==
=== Non-commissioned officer streams ===
Non-commissioned officers in the Greek armed forces are separated into three streams:

1. Σχολή Μονίμων Υπαξιωματικών (ΣΜΥ) (Permanent Non-Commissioned Officers' School graduates (PNCO))
2. Εθελοντές Μακράς Θητείας (ΕΜΘ) (Long Term Volunteers (LTV) and, after 2001, Επαγγελματίες Οπλίτες (ΕΠΟΠ, Professional Soldiers).
3. Έφεδροι (Reserves (conscripts))

=== NCO and other ranks insignia ===
NCO ranks (excl. OR-9 and conscript ranks) have undergone some changes through the years, the latest being in 2004-2006. In the army, PNCOs are designated by having two arcs above their chevrons, whereas LTVs and EPOP have no arcs. Pre-existing Standing Orders provisions, codified by a ministerial decision only in 2004, had a singular insignia for PNCOs and LVTs, while EPOP (post 2001), had the same insignia insignia with EPY, which were topped with a straight line. OVA insignia were identical, minus the flaming grenade.

In the navy, NCO ranks have undergone changes since 1975. In the navy PNCOs are designated by having two arcs above their chevrons, whereas LTVs had one arc. In the air force, following the Army model, PNCOs are designated by having two arcs above their chevrons, whereas LTVs have no arcs.

NATO code	OR-9	OR-8	OR-7	OR-6	OR-5	OR-4		OR-3	OR-2	OR-1
Hellenic Army										Arm/corps insignia only
Hellenic Army	Ανθυπασπιστής (Note: Greece has only one level of Warrant Officer. According to the current issue (2021) of STANAG 2116, the Greek Warrant Officers are included in OR-9, however they are afforded the privileges of an officer. See STANAG 2116 note 29, page D-9); Anthypaspistis	Αρχιλοχίας; Archilochias	Επιλοχίας; Epilochias	Λοχίας; Lochias		Δεκανέας; Dekaneas		Υποδεκανέας; Ypodekaneas		Στρατιώτης; Stratiotis
Hellenic Army (Conscripts)		No equivalent								No insignia
Hellenic Army (Conscripts)	Δόκιμος Έφεδρος Αξιωματικός; Dokimos Efedros Axiomatikos	No equivalent		Λοχίας; Lochias		Δεκανέας; Dekaneas		Υποδεκανέας; Ypodekaneas	Υποψήφιος Έφεδρος Βαθμοφόρος; Ypopsifios Efedros Bathmoforos	Στρατιώτης; Stratiotis
Hellenic Navy						male	female			male	female
Hellenic Navy	Ανθυπασπιστής; Anthypaspistis	Αρχικελευστής; Archikelefstis	Επικελευστής; Epikelefstis	Κελευστής; Kelefstis		Δίοπος; Diopos				Ναύτης; Naftis
Hellenic Navy (Conscripts)		No equivalent
Hellenic Navy (Conscripts)	Σημαιοφόρος Επίκουρος Αξιωματικός; Simaioforos Epikouros Axiomatikos	No equivalent		Κελευστής; Kelefstis		Δίοπος; Diopos				Ναύτης; Naftis
Hellenic Air Force
Hellenic Air Force	Ανθυπασπιστής; Anthypaspistis	Αρχισμηνίας; Archisminias	Επισμηνίας; Episminias	Σμηνίας; Sminias		Υποσμηνίας; Yposminias				Σμηνίτης; Sminitis
Hellenic Air Force (Conscripts)	No equivalent									No insignia
Hellenic Air Force (Conscripts)	No equivalent				Κληρωτός Σμηνίας; Klirotos Sminias					Σμηνίτης; Sminitis
NATO code	OR-9	OR-8	OR-7	OR-6	OR-5	OR-4		OR-3	OR-2	OR-1

=== 2027 reform ===
==== PNCOs ====
Graduates of PNCO Schools will no longer automatically be promoted to OF-1 after 19 years of service. Instead, a new rank structure will be instituted, with a starting rank of Επιλοχίας Β', outranking all volunteers from graduation. Promotions to Anthypaspistís Schimatismoú and above will be effectuated by selection, like flag officers, after the 35-year retirement limit. Promotions to Anthypaspistís V' and Archilochías V' will not necessitate time served in the preceding rank.

PNCOs may be transferred to the officer corps under certain conditions (holding a degree, 14 years of service, etc.). Starting in 2027, all three PNCO schools will confer degrees equivalent to university degrees, like officer academies.

PNCO ranks will be altered as follows:

Pay grade 2027	Y12	Y11		Y10	Y9	Y8	Y7
Insignia							
Name in Greek	Ανθυπασπιστής ΓΕΕΘΑ; Anthypaspistís GEETHA	Ανθυπασπιστής ΓΕ; Anthypaspistís GE		Ανθυπασπιστής Μείζονος Σχηματισμού; Anthypaspistís Meízonos Schim	Ανθυπασπιστής Σχηματισμού; Anthypaspistís Schimatismoú	Ανθυπασπιστής Α΄ Anthypaspistís A´	Ανθυπασπιστής Β΄ Anthypaspistís V´
Translation	Hellenic National Defence General Staff CWO	Hellenic Army General Staff CWO	General Staff CWO	Major Formation CWO	Formation Command Warrant Officer	Warrant Officer 1st Class	Warrant Officer 2nd Class

Pay grade 2027	Y6	Y5	Y4	Y3	Y2	Y1
Insignia			(in red)			(in red)
Name in Greek	Αρχιλοχίας Μονάδος; Archilochías Monádos	Αρχιλοχίας Α΄ Archilochías A´	Αρχιλοχίας Β΄ Archilochías V´	Επιλοχίας Ανεξάρτητης Υπομονάδος; Epilochías Anexártitis Ypomonádos	Επιλοχίας Α΄ Epilochías A´	Επιλοχίας Β΄ Epilochías V´
Translation	Command Sergeant-Major	Sergeant Major 1st Class	Sergeant Major 2nd Class	Independent Subunit Staff Sergeant	Staff Sergeant 1st Class	Staff Sergeant 2nd Class

==== Volunteers/Professional Soldiers ====
Volunteer ranks are also split in two (with the exception of the rank of Stratiotis). Volunteers will no longer be promoted to Archilochías. Promotions to E9-E12 will be effectuated by selection, like flag officers, after the 35-year retirement limit. They may be transferred to the Corps of Permanent NCOs to fill organizational positions if they have completed a specific period of service (e.g., 15 years) and meet academic criteria.

Pay grade 2027	E12	E11	E10	E9	E8	E7	E6	E5	E4	E3	E2	E1
Insignia/Description	E9 insignia, silver star replaced by golden star with a line to its left and to its right	E9 insignia covered by three lines	E9 insignia covered by two lines	E7 insignia, flaming grenade replaced by silver star	E7 insignia covered by two lines	covered by a straight line	E5 insignia, flaming grenade replaced by silver star	E4 insignia covered by another straight line	covered by a straight line	E2 insignia covered by another straight line	covered by a straight line	no insignia
Rank	Επιλοχιας Διοικησεως A΄ Ταξης; Epilochias Dioikiseos A´ Taxis	Επιλοχιας Διοικησεως B΄ Ταξης; Epilochias Dioikiseos V´ Taxis	Επιλοχιας Διοικησεως Γ΄ Ταξης; Epilochias Dioikiseos G´ Taxis	Επιλοχιας Βοηθος Επιτελη; Epilochias Voithos Epiteli	Επιλοχιας A΄ Ταξης; Epilochias A´ Taxis	Επιλοχιας Β΄ Ταξης; Epilochias V´ Taxis	Λοχιας Βοηθος Επιτελη; Lochias Voithos Epiteli	Λοχιας A΄ Ταξης; Lochias A´ Taxis	Λοχιας Β΄ Ταξης; Lochias V´ Taxis	Δεκανεας A΄ Ταξης; Dekaneas A´ Taxis	Δεκανεας Β΄ Ταξης; Dekaneas V´ Taxis	Στρατιωτης; Stratiotis

== Historic ranks ==
Officers

NATO code	OF-10	OF-9	OF-8	OF-7	OF-6	OF-5	OF-4	OF-3	OF-2	OF-1
Hellenic Army (c. 1988)
Hellenic Army (c. 1988)		Στρατηγός; Stratigos	Αντιστράτηγος; Antistratigos	Υποστράτηγος; Ypostratigos	Ταξίαρχος; Taxiarchos	Συνταγματάρχης; Syntagmatarchis	Αντισυνταγματάρχης; Antisyntagmatarchis	Ταγματάρχης; Tagmatarchis	Λοχαγός; Lochagos	Υπολοχαγός; Ypolochagos	Ανθυπολοχαγός; Anthypolochagos
Hellenic Navy (c. 1988)
Hellenic Navy (c. 1988)		Ναύαρχος; Navarchos	Αντιναύαρχος; Antinavarchos	Υποναύαρχος; Yponavarchos	Αρχιπλοίαρχος; Archiploiarchos	Πλοίαρχος; Ploiarchos	Αντιπλοίαρχος; Antiploiarchos	Πλωτάρχης; Plotarchis	Υποπλοίαρχος; Ypoploiarchos	Ανθυποπλοίαρχος; Anthypoploiarchos	Σημαιοφόρος; Simaioforos
Hellenic Air Force (c. 1980–2000)
Hellenic Air Force (c. 1980–2000)		Πτέραρχος; Pterarchos	Αντιπτέραρχος; Antipterarchos	Υποπτέραρχος; Ypopterarchos	Ταξίαρχος; Taxiarchos	Σμήναρχος; Sminarchos	Αντισμήναρχος; Antisminarchos	Επισμηναγός; Episminagos	Σμηναγός; Sminagos	Υποσμηναγός; Yposminagos	Ανθυποσμηναγός; Anthyposminagos

NCOs and enlisted

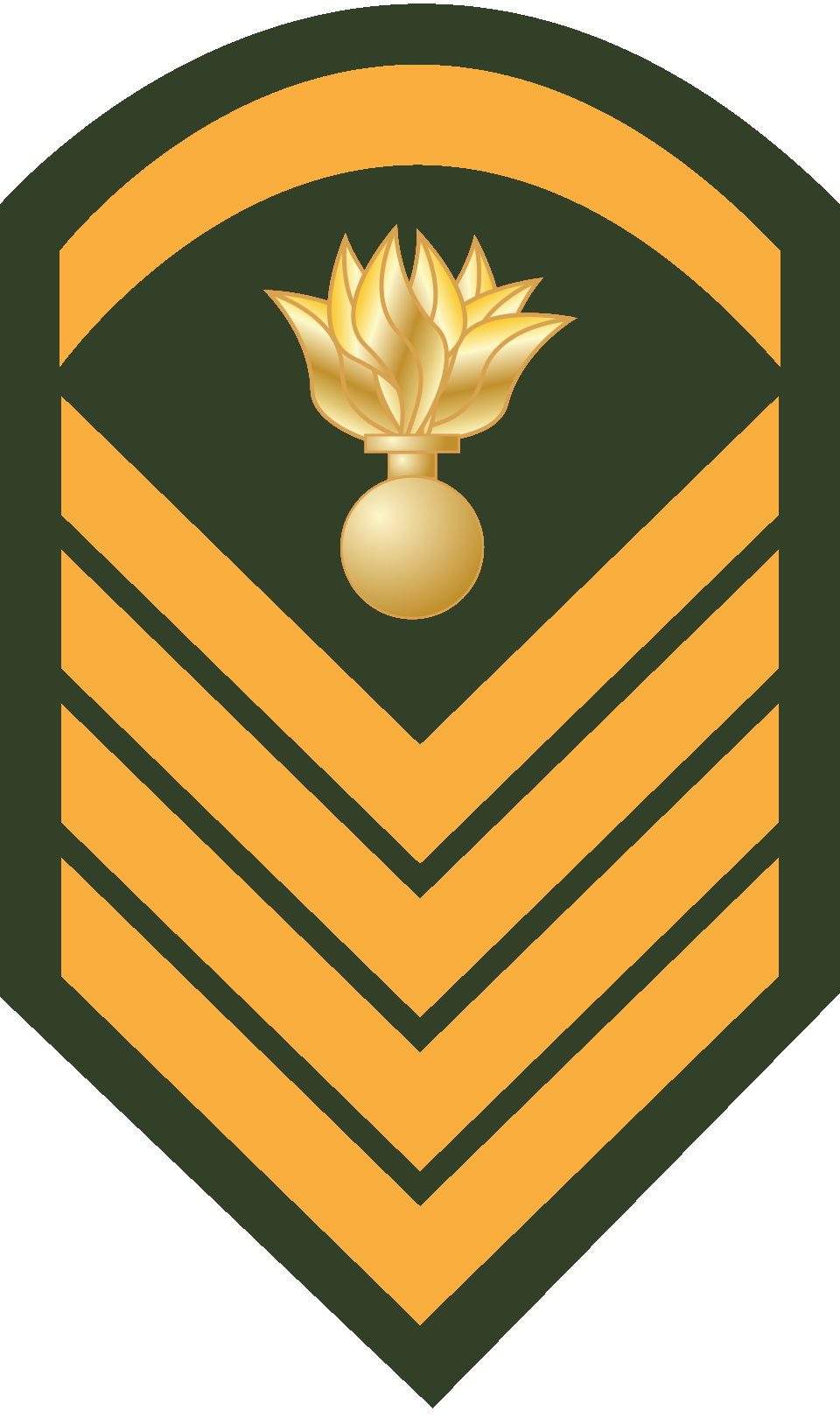
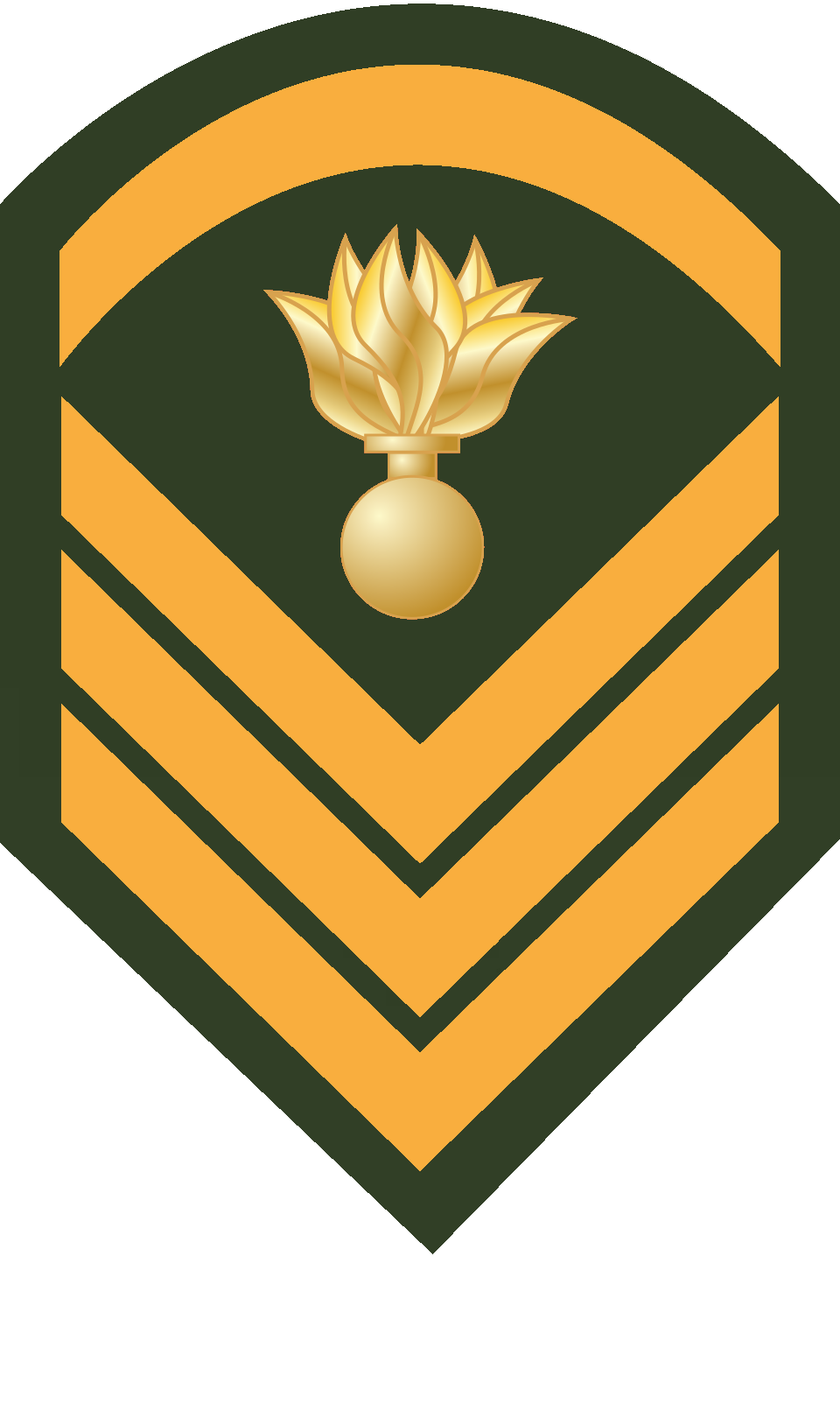
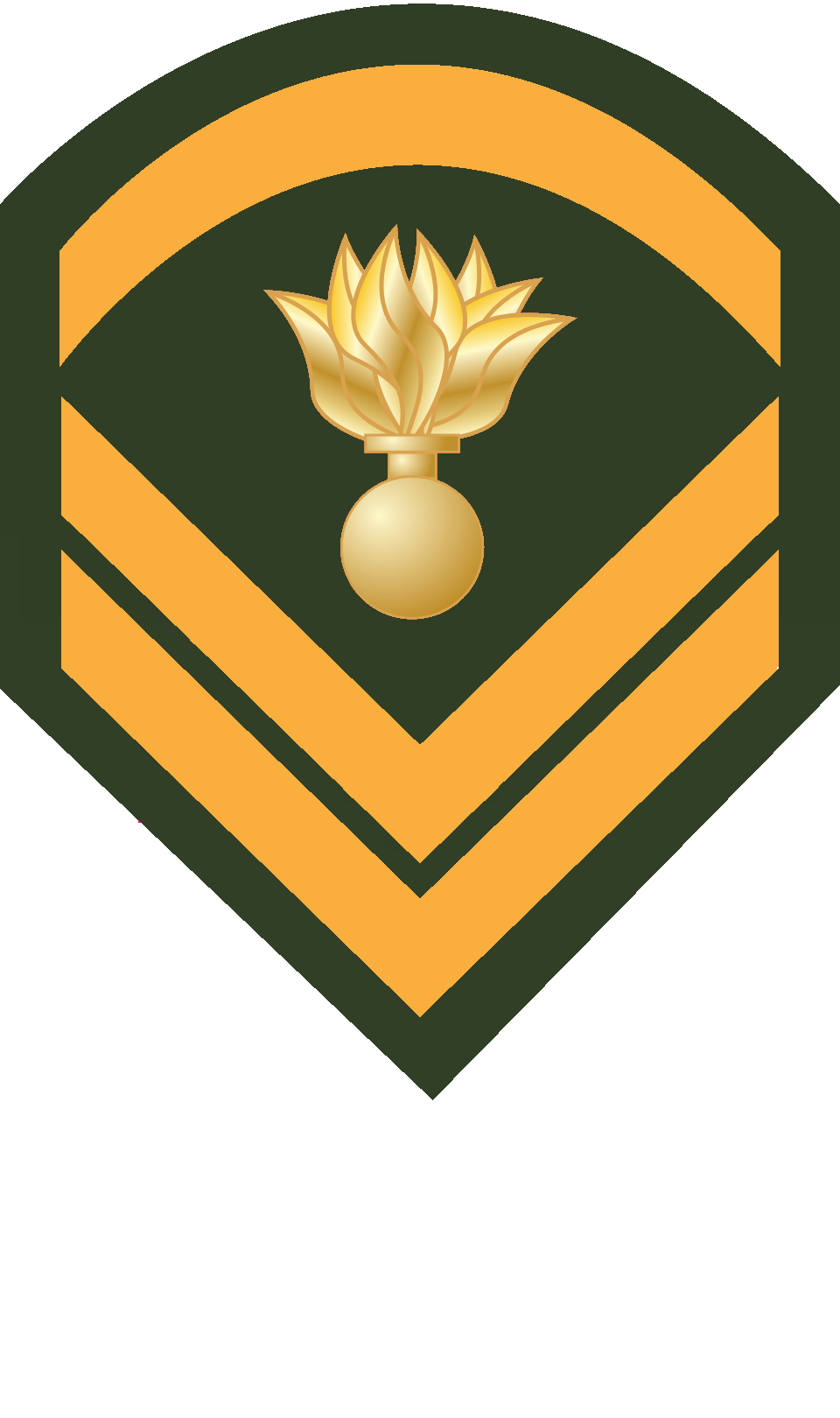
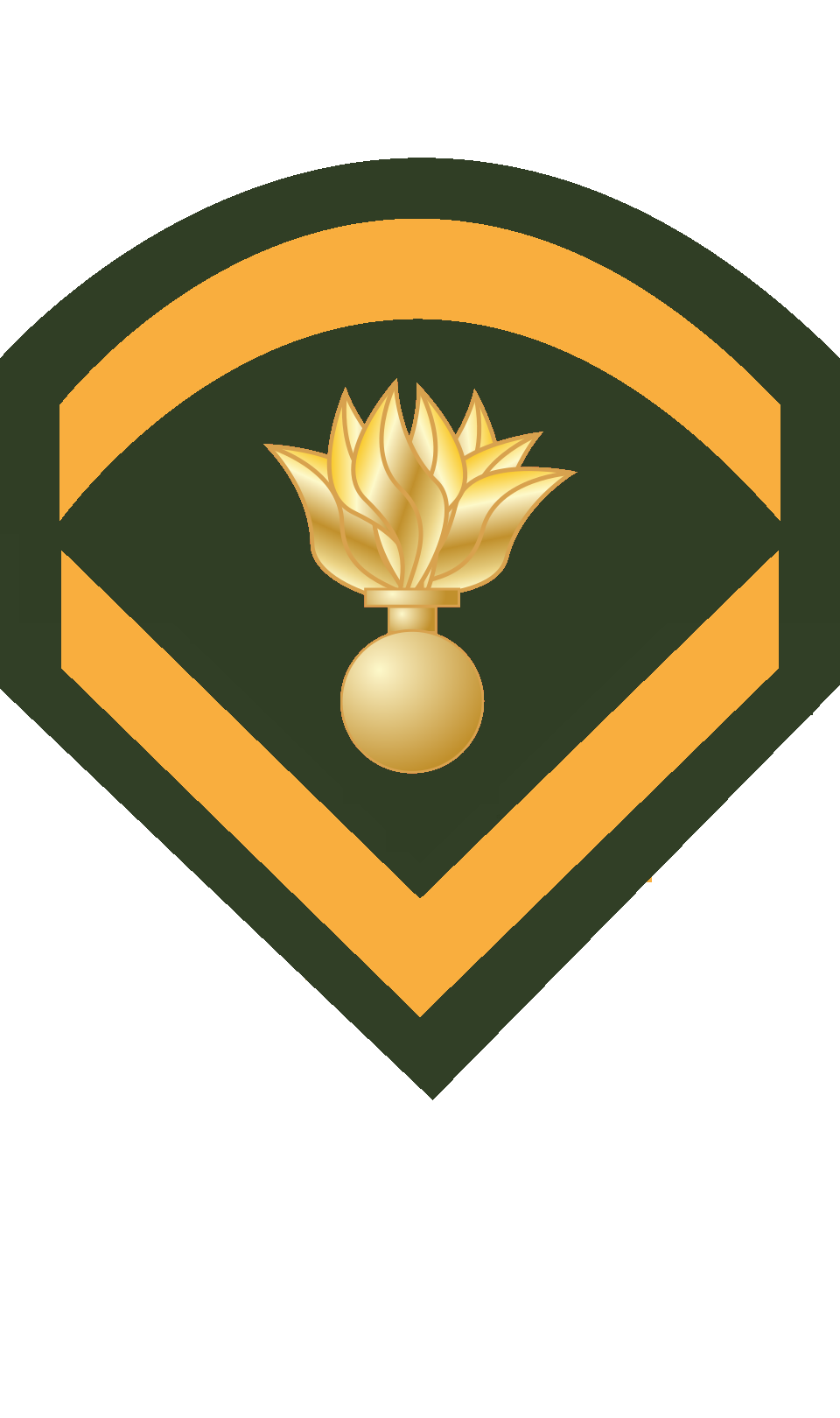
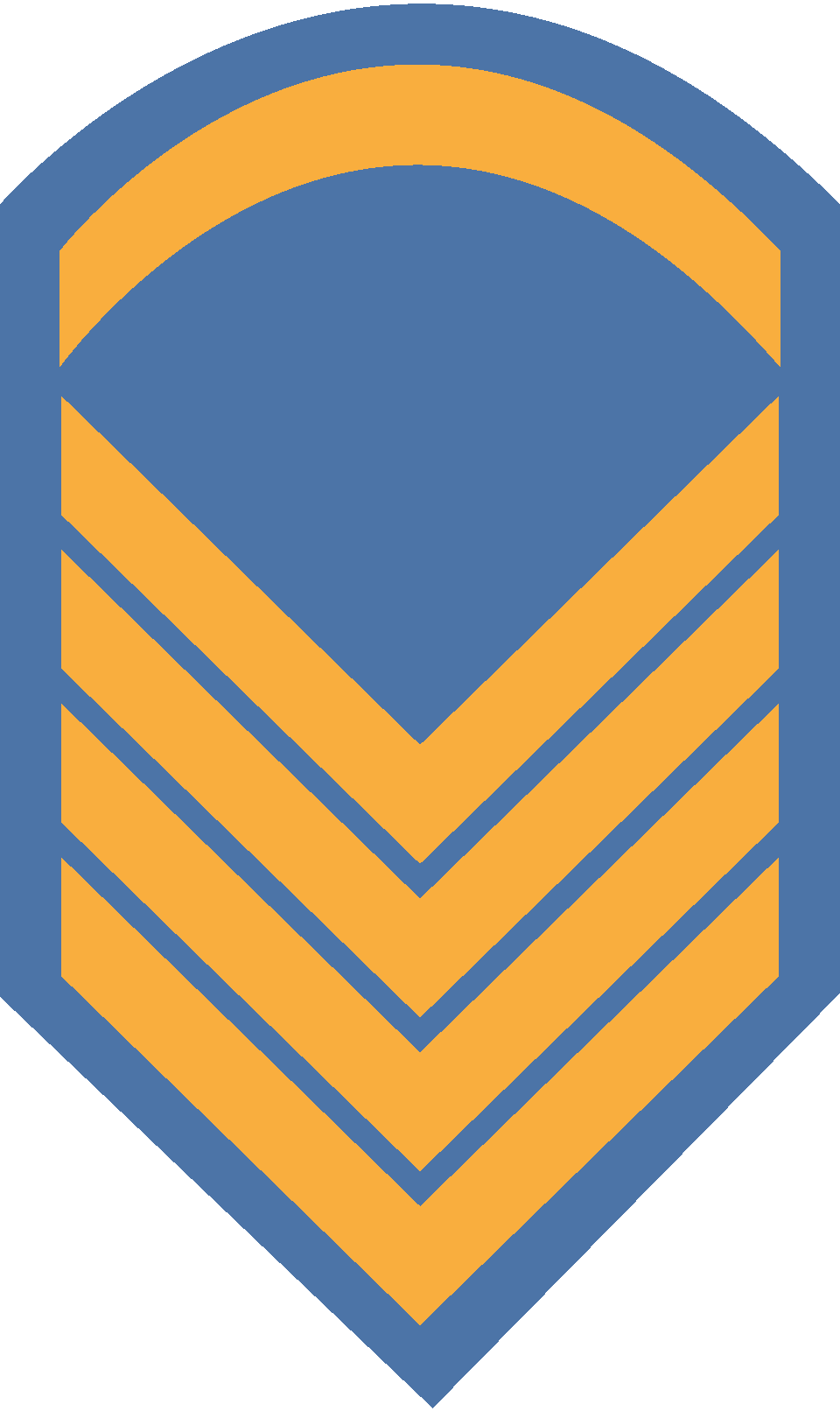
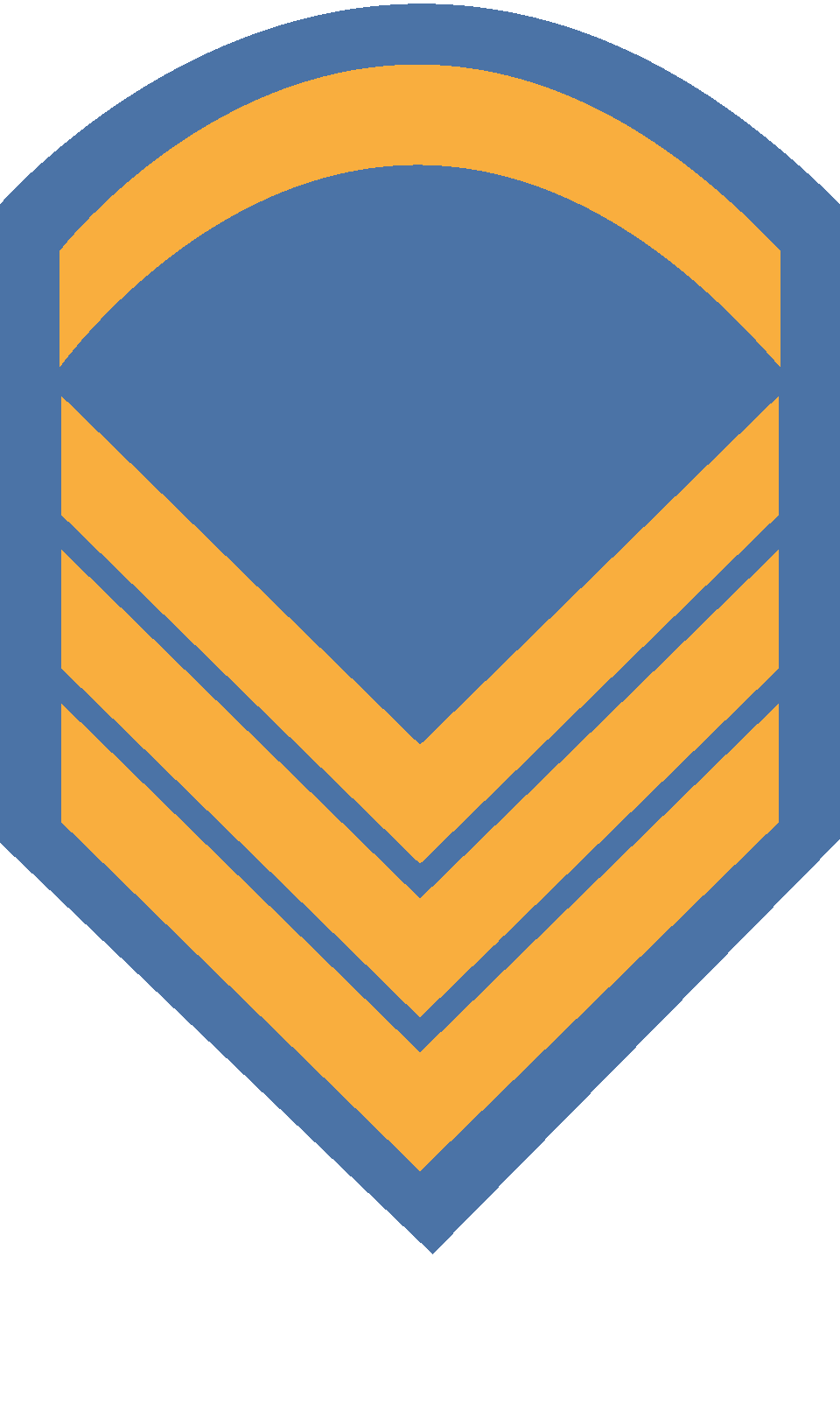
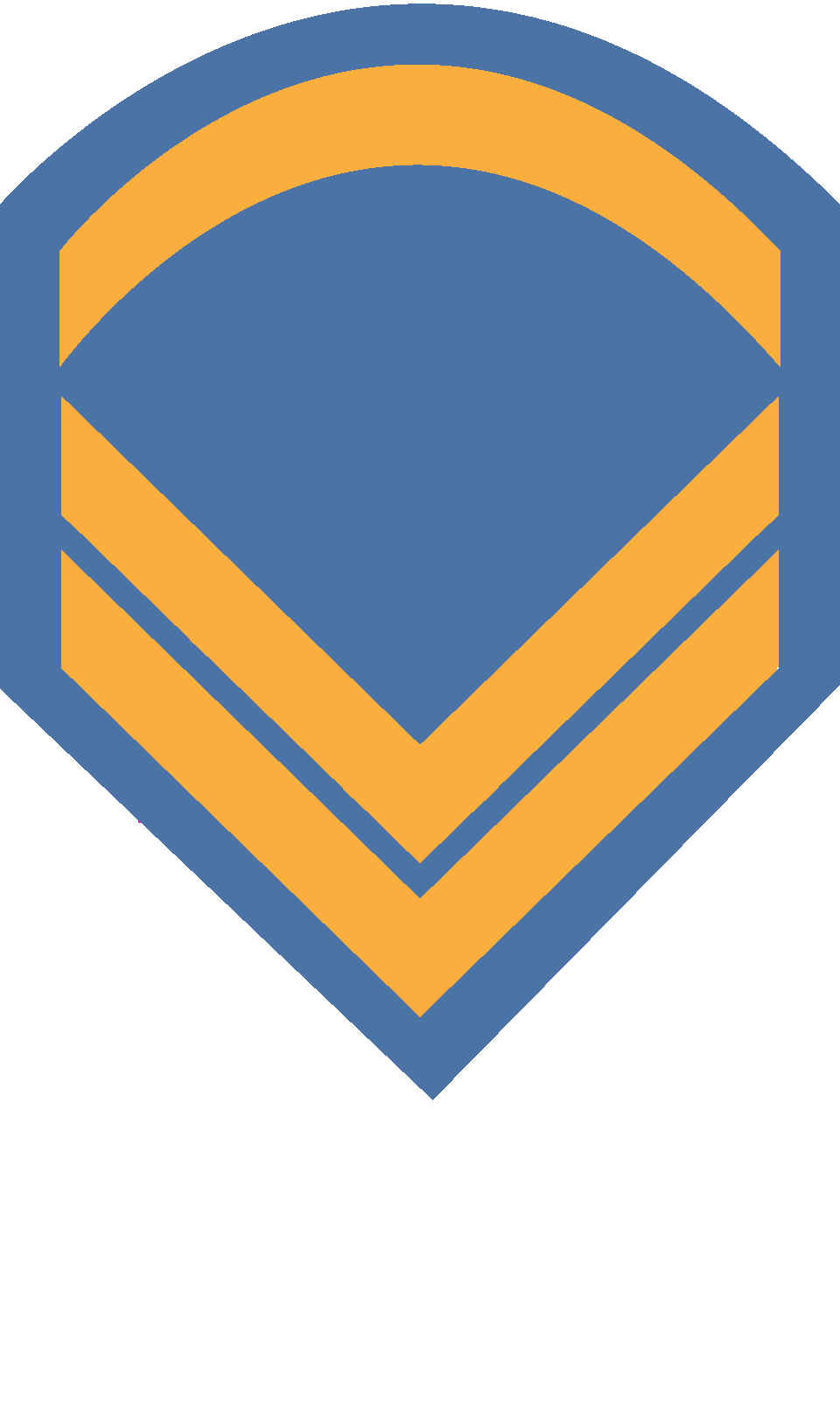
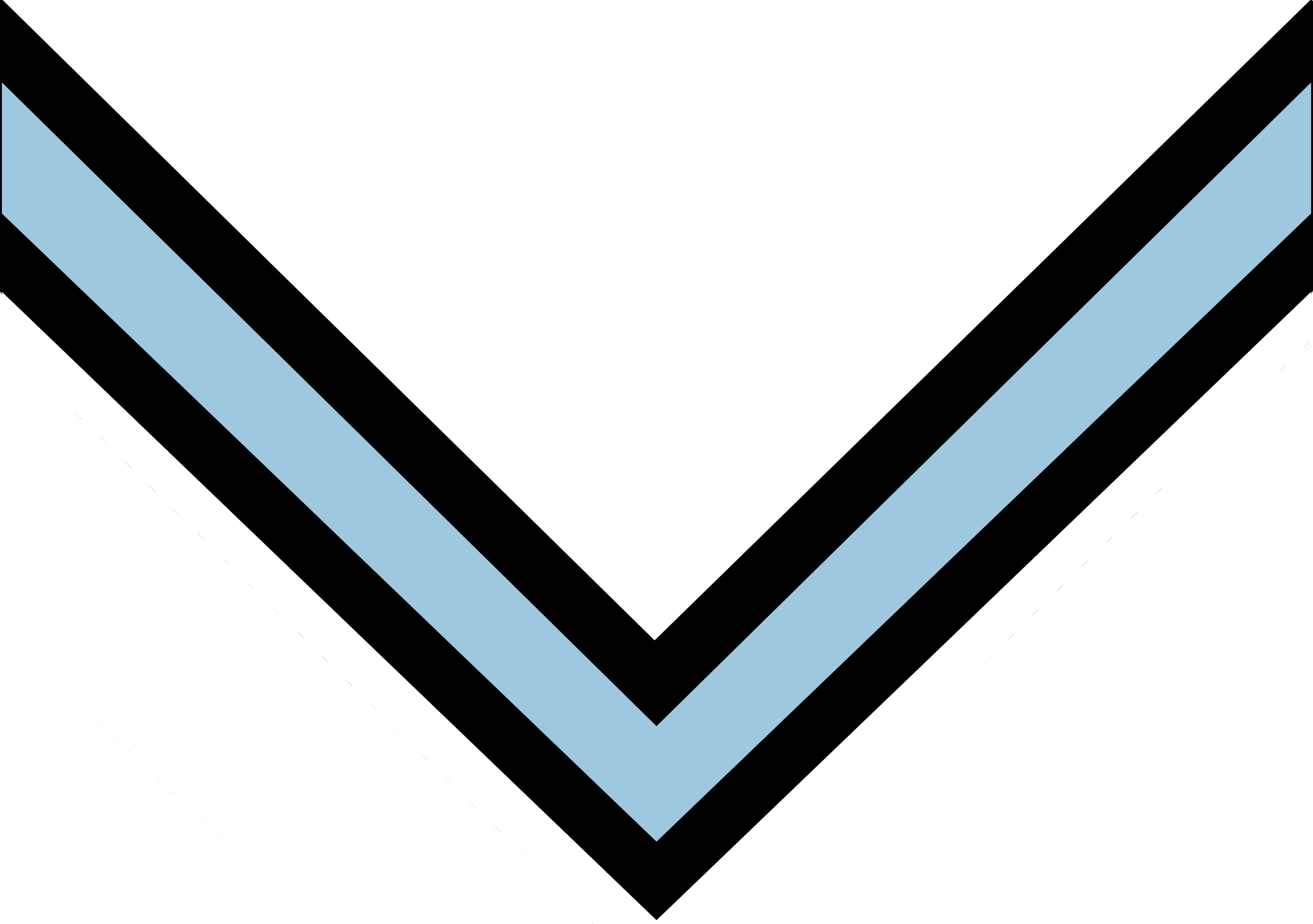
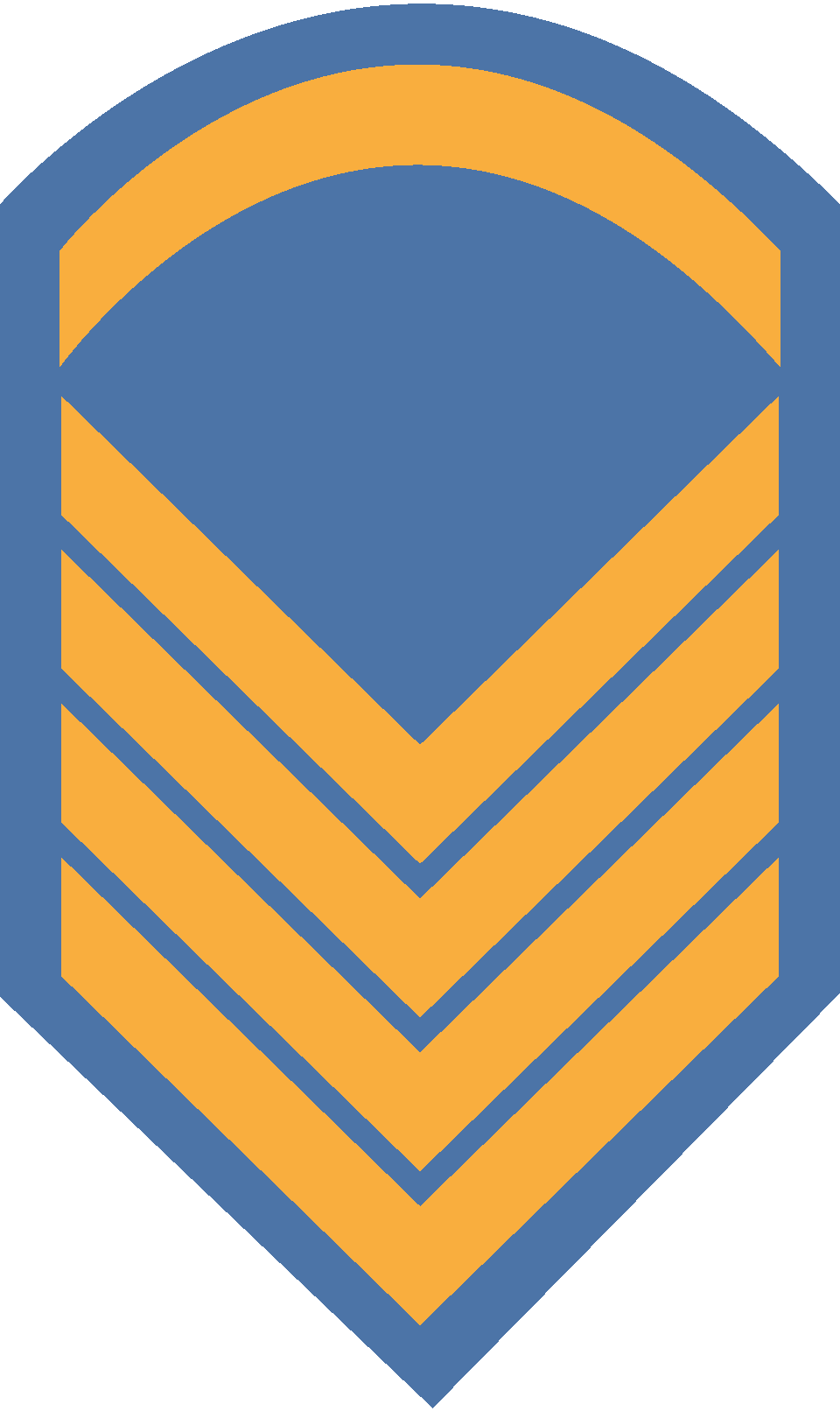
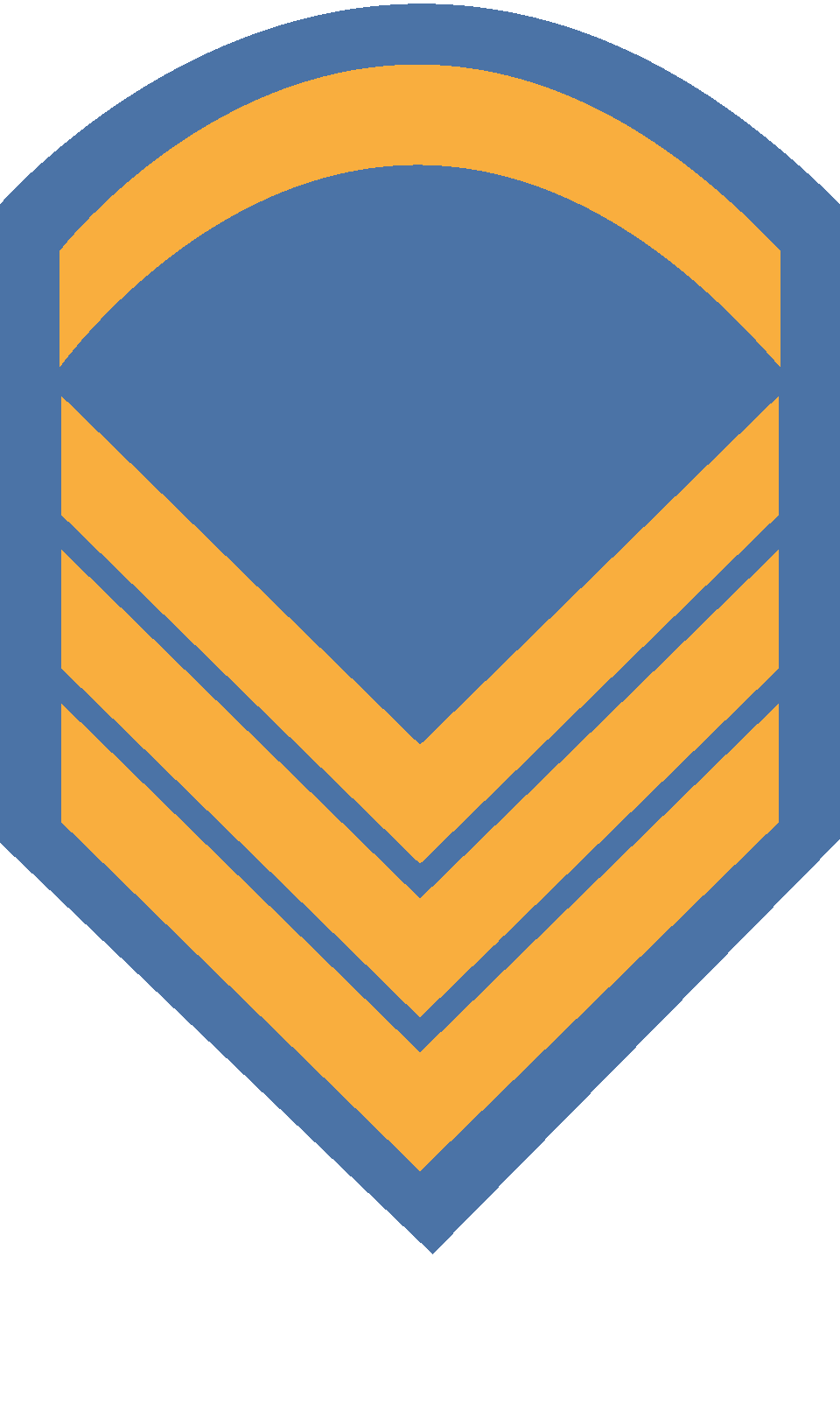
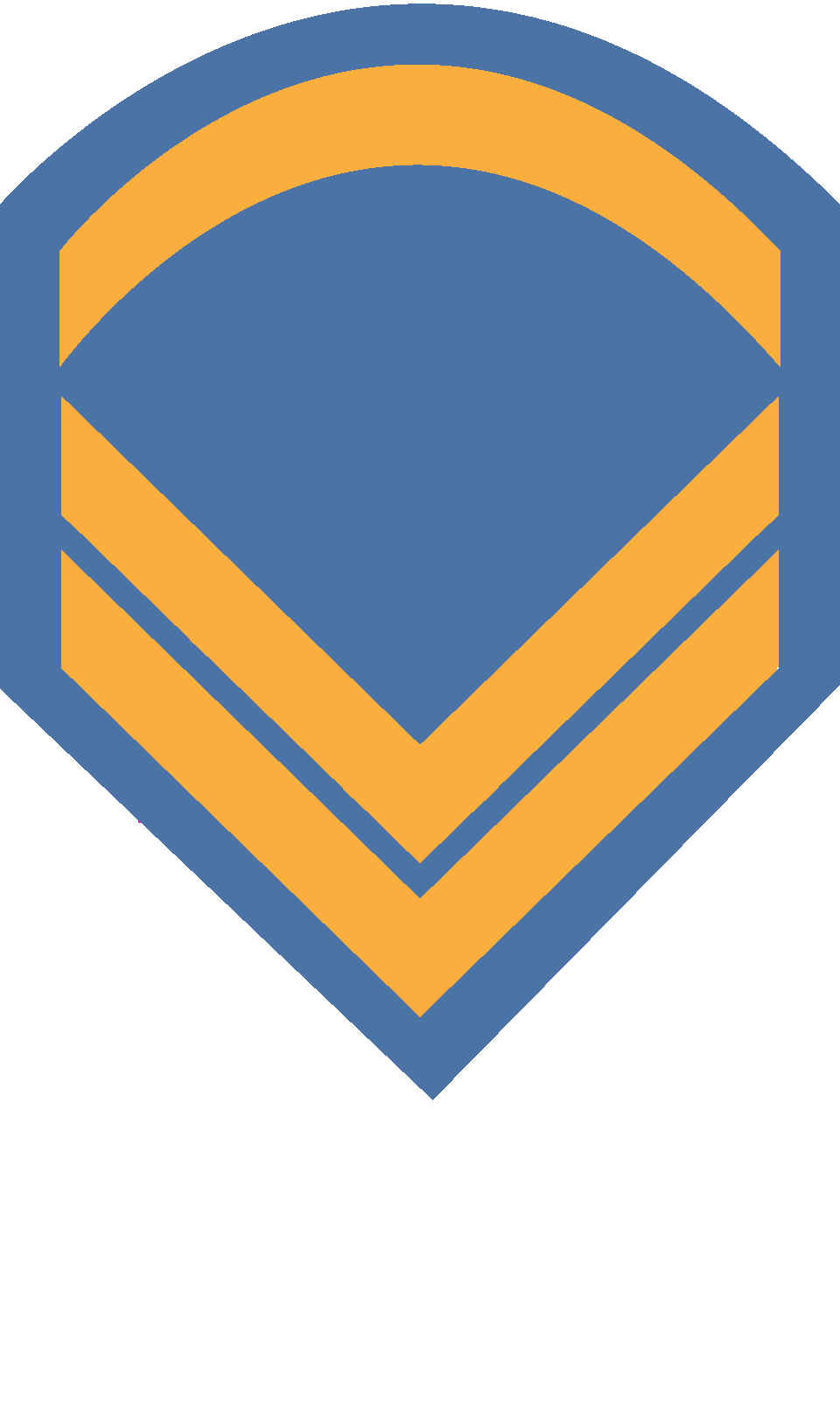
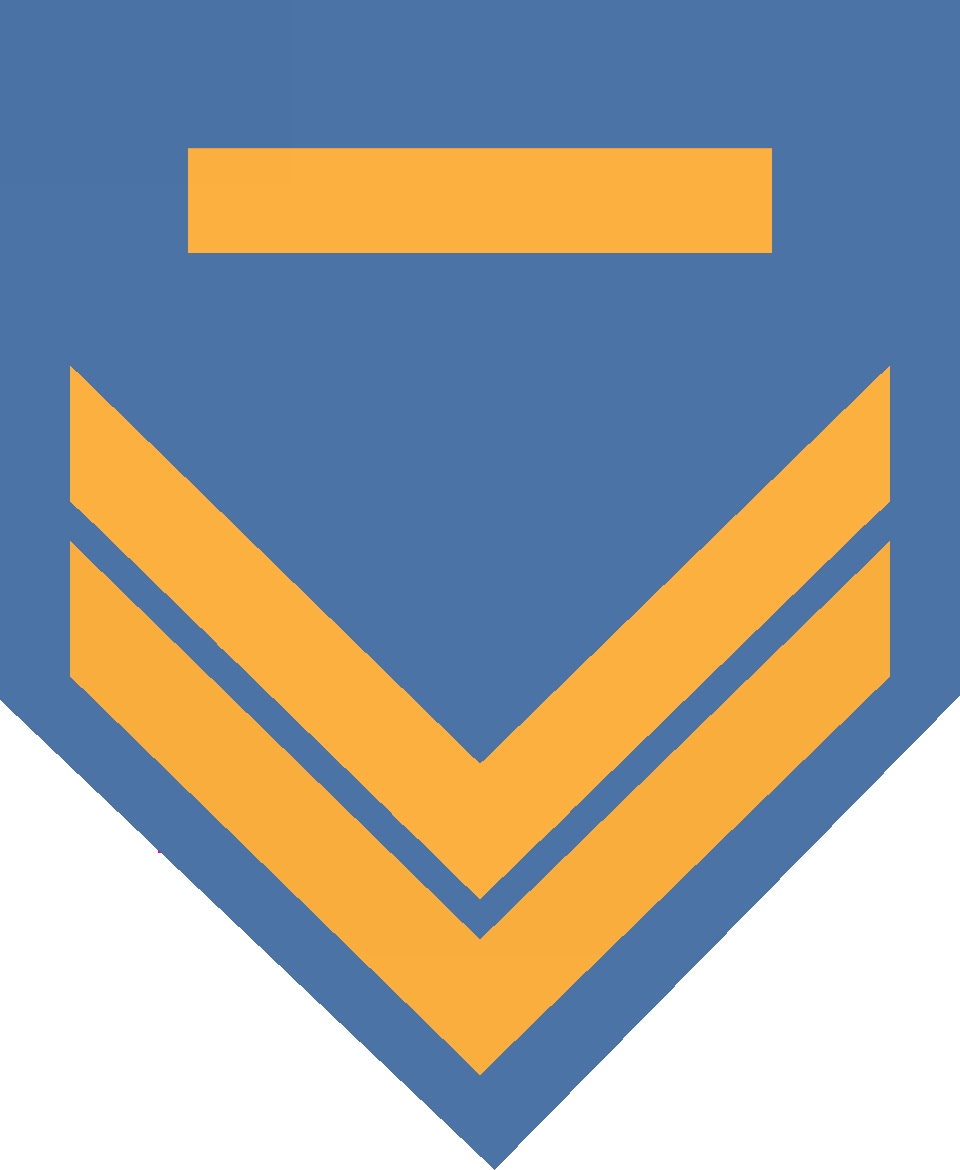
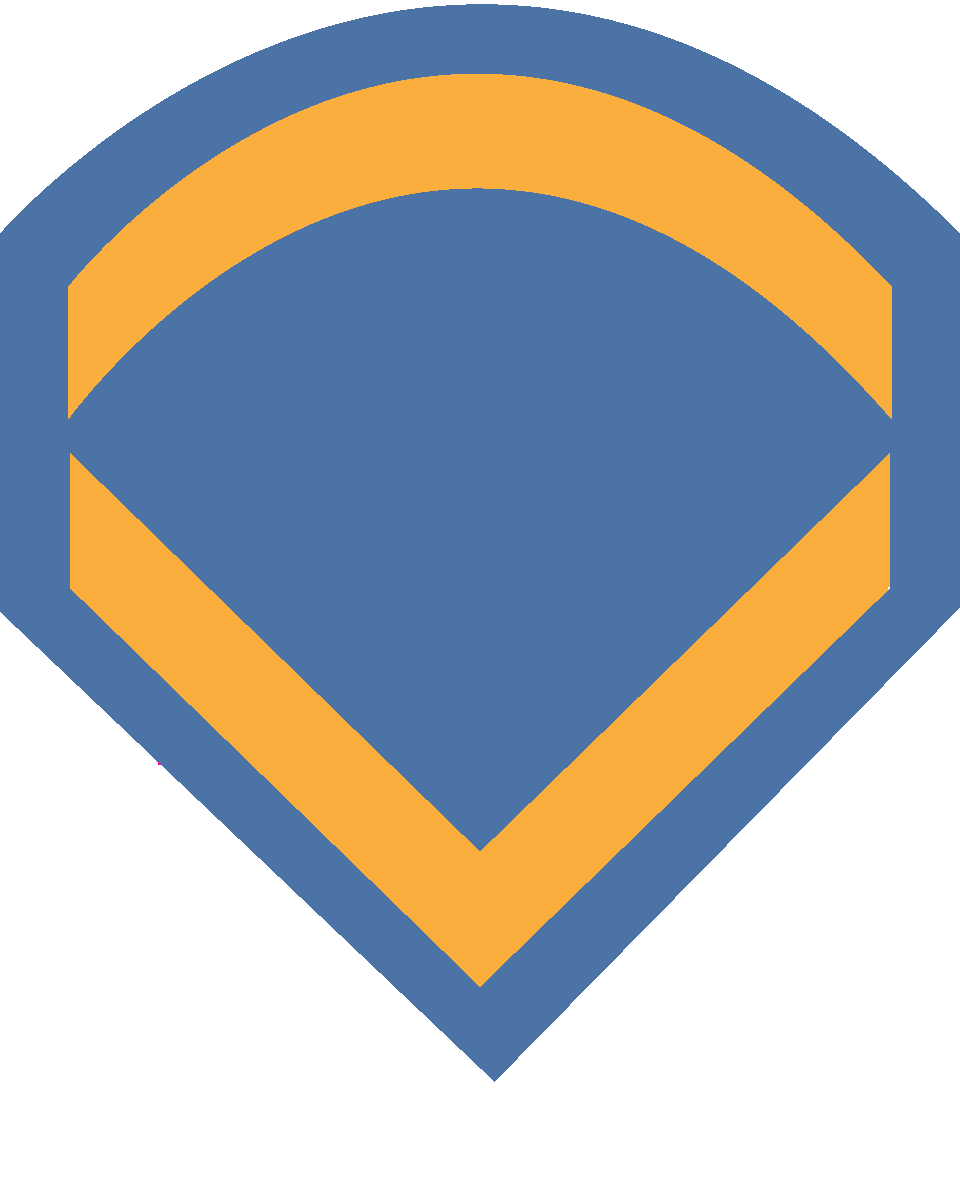
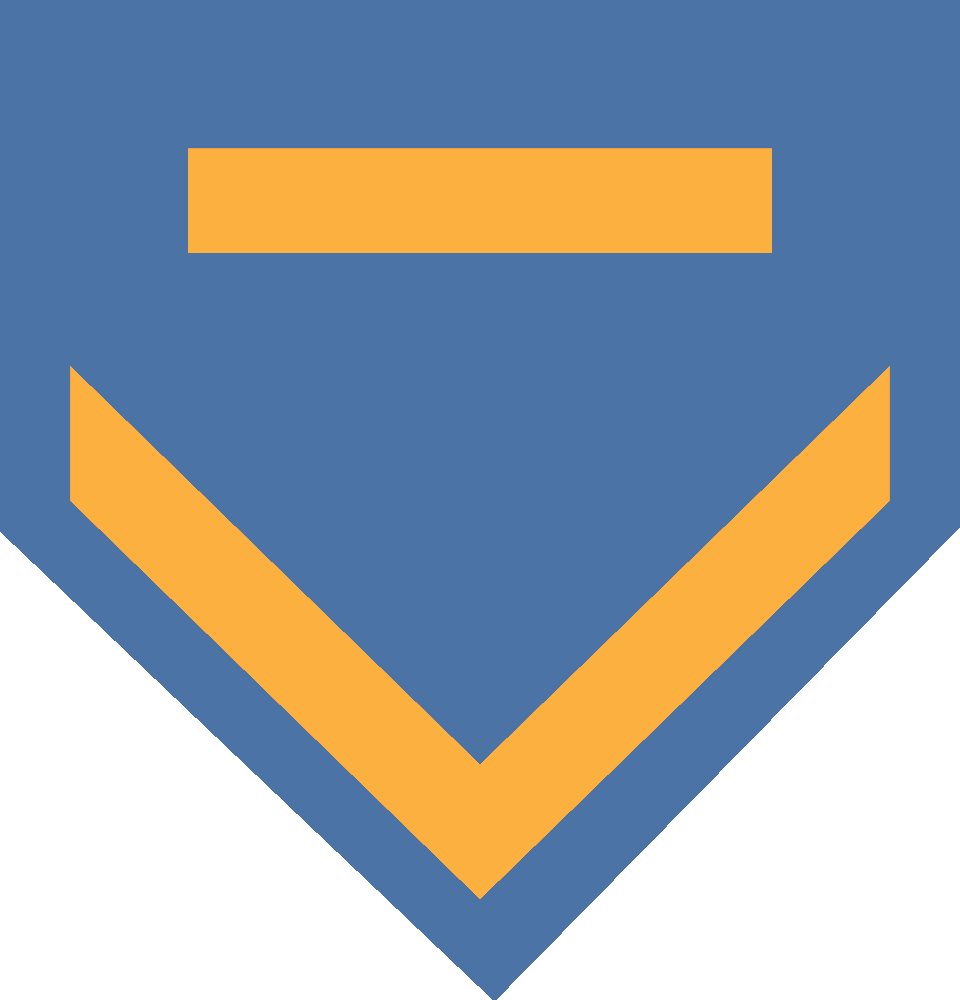
NATO code	OR-9		OR-8	OR-7	OR-6	OR-5			OR-4		OR-3	OR-2	OR-1
Hellenic Army (c. 1988)													Arm/corps insignia only
Hellenic Army (c. 1988)	Ανθυπασπιστής; Anthypaspistis			Αρχιλοχίας; Archilochias	Επιλοχίας; Epilochias	Λοχίας; Lochias			Δεκανεύς; Dekanefs	Δεκανεύς; Dekanefs (conscript)	Υποδεκανεύς; Ypodekanefs (conscript)		Στρατιώτης; Stratiotis (conscript)
Hellenic Navy (1986–1988)
Hellenic Navy (1986–1988)	Επίκουρος Σημαιοφόρος; Epikouros Simaioforos	Ανθυπασπιστής; Anthypaspistis		Αρχικελευστής; Archikelefstis	Επικελευστής; Epikelefstis	Κελευστής; Kelefstis		Δόκιμος kελευστής Dokimos kelefstis	Δίοπος; Diopos				Ναύτης; Naftis
Hellenic Air Force (1980–2000)									(Note: LVT)	(Note: Conscript)			No insignia
Hellenic Air Force (1980–2000)	Ανθυπασπιστής; Anthypaspistis			Αρχισμηνίας; Archisminias	Επισμηνίας; Episminias	Σμηνίας; Sminias		Έφεδρος Σμηνίας; Efedros Sminias	Υποσμηνίας; Yposminias				Σμηνίτης; Sminitis
Hellenic Air Force (2000–2004)													No insignia
Hellenic Air Force (2000–2004)	Ανθυπασπιστής; Anthypaspistis			Αρχισμηνίας; Archisminias	Επισμηνίας; Episminias	Σμηνίας; Sminias	Σμηνίας EΠY; Sminias EPY	Έφεδρος Σμηνίας; Efedros Sminias	Υποσμηνίας; Yposminias	Υποσμηνίας EΠY; Yposminias EPY			Σμηνίτης; Sminitis
NATO code	OR-9		OR-8	OR-7	OR-6	OR-5			OR-4		OR-3	OR-2	OR-1

== See also ==
- Military of Greece
- Kingdom of Greece Army Ranks
- Royal Hellenic Navy rank insignia
- Royal Hellenic Air Force ranks
