= Navarch =

Greek word meaning "leader of the ships"

Navarch, Navarchus or Nauarchus (Greek: ναύαρχος, návarchos) is an Anglicisation of a Greek word meaning "archon (leader) of the ships", which in some states became the title of an office equivalent to that of a modern admiral.

== Historical usage ==
Not all states gave their naval commanders such a title. Athens, for instance, placed its fleet under the command of generals (strategoi) holding the same title as those who commanded its land forces. In Athens navarch was only used for the commander of the Athenian sacred ships. Such command structures reflected the fact that, especially early in the Classical period, fleets operated in close conjunction with land forces, and indeed, the title of navarch did not begin to appear until the time of the Peloponnesian War, when fleets began to operate more independently. This separate title was originally used in cities that lacked an established naval tradition, Sparta being the most prominent, but entered broader use later, being adopted by the navies of the Hellenistic period states such as Macedon, Syracuse, the Ptolemaic Kingdom, the Seleucid Empire, the Achaean League, and Rhodes.

At Sparta and many other city-states, the position was held for one year only (a situation that compelled the Spartans to resort to an elaborate legal fiction when they wished to reinstate Lysander for more than one year in command). Admirals of despotic or monarchic states, however, could serve for years at a time. At Sparta, the position, unlike most high-level offices, was available to men from outside the Spartiate class; Lysander, the most famous occupant of the office, was a beneficiary of this rule.

The Latinisation nauarchus was used by the Roman navy for its squadron commanders. The Greek-speaking Byzantines sometimes used the term to designate the captains of ships; the terms drungarios or strategos were used to designate their admirals.

== Modern Greece ==
Rank flag of a návarchos.

In the modern Hellenic Navy, návarchos is the highest rank, equivalent to full admiral. All but one of the remaining flag ranks are also derivations of this word: antinávarchos (αντιναύαρχος, 'deputy-admiral') is the equivalent to vice admiral and yponávarchos (υποναύαρχος, 'under-admiral'), equivalent to rear admiral, while archiploíarchos is the equivalent of commodore. The same ranks are also used by the Hellenic Coast Guard.

The rank of full admiral is held in active service only by the Chief of the General Staff of National Defence, when he is a naval officer, and customarily given to the Chiefs of the Hellenic Navy General Staff, who normally carry the rank of vice admiral, on retirement.

Under the Greek monarchy, the five-star rank of archinávarchos (αρχιναύαρχος), equivalent to grand admiral or admiral of the fleet, was introduced in 1939. It was held ex officio by the reigning monarch, who also held the equivalent ranks in the army and air force. Only kings George II, Paul and Constantine II held the rank.

Flag of Greece Greek commissioned officer ranks
NATO code:	OF-1	OF-2	OF-3	OF-4	OF-5	OF-6	OF-7	OF-8	OF-9
Navy:	Simaioforos & Anthypoploiarchos	Ypoploiarchos	Plotarchis	Antiploiarchos	Ploiarchos	Archiploiarchos	Yponavarchos	Antinavarchos	Navarchos
Army:	Anthypolochagos & Ypolochagos; Ypilarchos & Anthypilarchos (Armoured)	Lochagos; Ilarchos (Armoured)	Tagmatarchis	Antisyntagmatarchis	Syntagmatarchis	Taxiarchos	Ypostratigos	Antistratigos	Stratigos
Air Force:	Anthyposminagos & Yposminagos	Sminagos	Episminagos	Antisminarchos	Sminarchos	Taxiarchos Aeroporias	Ypopterarchos	Antipterarchos	Pterarchos

== See also ==
- Polemarch – Senior military title in various ancient Greek city states
