= Royal Hellenic Navy rank insignia =

This article contains the rank insignia of the Royal Hellenic Navy (until 1973).

== Officer ranks ==
Rank group	General / flag officers					Senior officers			Junior officers
Royal Hellenic Navy (World War 1 era)
Royal Hellenic Navy (World War 1 era)		Ναύαρχος; Navarchos	Ἀντιναύαρχος; Antinavarchos	Ὑποναύαρχος; Yponavarchos		Πλοίαρχος; Ploiarchos	Ἀντιπλοίαρχος; Antiploiarchos	Πλωτάρχης; Plotarchis	Ὑποπλοίαρχος; Ypoploiarchos	Ἀνθυποπλοίαρχος; Anthypoploiarchos	Σημαιοφόρος; Simaioforos
Royal Hellenic Navy (1936–1973)
Royal Hellenic Navy (1936–1973)	Ἀρχιναύαρχος; Archinavarchos	Ναύαρχος; Navarchos	Ἀντιναύαρχος; Antinavarchos	Ὑποναύαρχος; Yponavarchos	Ἀρχιπλοίαρχος; Archiploíarchos (1969 onwards)	Πλοίαρχος; Ploiarchos	Ἀντιπλοίαρχος; Antiploiarchos	Πλωτάρχης; Plotarchis	Ὑποπλοίαρχος; Ypoploiarchos	Ἀνθυποπλοίαρχος; Anthypoploiarchos	Σημαιοφόρος; Simaioforos
NATO code	OF-10	OF-9	OF-8	OF-7	OF-6	OF-5	OF-4	OF-3	OF-2	OF-1

^{1} The rank was instituted in 1939 for King George II, and was held only by his successors, King Paul and King Constantine II.

The rank of Archiploiarchos was instituted in 1969, with the same decree that also "normalised" the previously extraordinary wartime rank of four-star Navarchos. Preceding Decrees on the organisation of the Armed Forces and RHN Uniform Regulations didn't include it.

=== Reserve officers ===
Reserve officers were divided into two categories: reserves from among the reserves (έφεδροι εξ εφέδρων) and auxiliary (επίκουροι) officers. Αs per the 1937 and 1956 Regulations, reserves wore RNR-like insignia with wavy lines, whereas auxiliaries wore RNVR-like insignia.

Sleeve insignia of an Έφεδρος (εξ Εφέδρων) Σημαιοφόρος

Sleeve insignia of an Σημαιοφόρος Επίκουρος

== Other ranks ==
Rank group	Senior NCOs					Junior NCOs		Enlisted
Royal Hellenic Navy (World War 1 era)									No insignia
Royal Hellenic Navy (World War 1 era)		Master chief petty officer Ἀρχικελευστής (1915 onwards)		Chief Petty Officer; Κελευστής	Petty officer, 1st class Ὑποκελευστὴς Α΄	Petty officer, 2nd class Ὑποκελευστὴς Β΄	Leading Seaman; Δίοπος	Able Seaman; Ὑποδίοπος	Seaman; Ναύτης
Royal Hellenic Navy (1937–1956)									No insignia
Royal Hellenic Navy (1937–1956)	Warrant Officer Class 1 Ἀρχικελευστὴς Α΄	Warrant Officer Class 2 Ἀρχικελευστὴς Β΄		Chief Petty Officer; Κελευστής	Petty officer, 1st class Ὑποκελευστὴς Α΄	Petty officer, 2nd class Ὑποκελευστὴς Β΄	Leading Seaman; Δίοπος	Able Seaman; Ναύτης Α΄	Seaman; Ναύτης Β΄
Royal Hellenic Navy (1956–1968)									No insignia
Royal Hellenic Navy (1956–1968)		Warrant Officer; Ἀρχικελευστής		Chief Petty Officer; Κελευστής	Petty officer, 1st class Ὑποκελευστὴς Α΄	Petty officer, 2nd class Ὑποκελευστὴς Β΄	Leading Seaman; Δίοπος	Able Seaman; Ναύτης Α΄	Seaman; Ναύτης Β΄
Royal Hellenic Navy (1968–1973)									No insignia
Royal Hellenic Navy (1968–1973)		Warrant Officer; Ἀνθυπασπιστής		Master chief petty officer Ἀρχικελευστής	Senior Chief Petty Officer; Επικελευστής	Chief Petty Officer; Κελευστής	Leading Seaman; Δίοπος	Able Seaman; Ναύτης Α΄	Seaman; Ναύτης Β΄
NATO code	OR-9	OR-8	OR-7	OR-6	OR-5	OR-4	OR-3	OR-2	OR-1

=== Rank reform (1968) ===
In 1968 the rank structure was revamped:

Old rank	New rank
Archikeleustis	Anthypaspistis
Keleustis	Archikeleustis
Ypokeleustis 1i táxi	Epikeleustis
Ypokeleustis 2i táxi	Keleustis

=== Other NCOs ===
Reserve NCOs save for Αρχικελευστής wore their respective insignia. Starting in 1969, NCO schools graduates received the rank of Probationary Petty Officers (Δόκιμος Κελευστής) for a 20-month period.

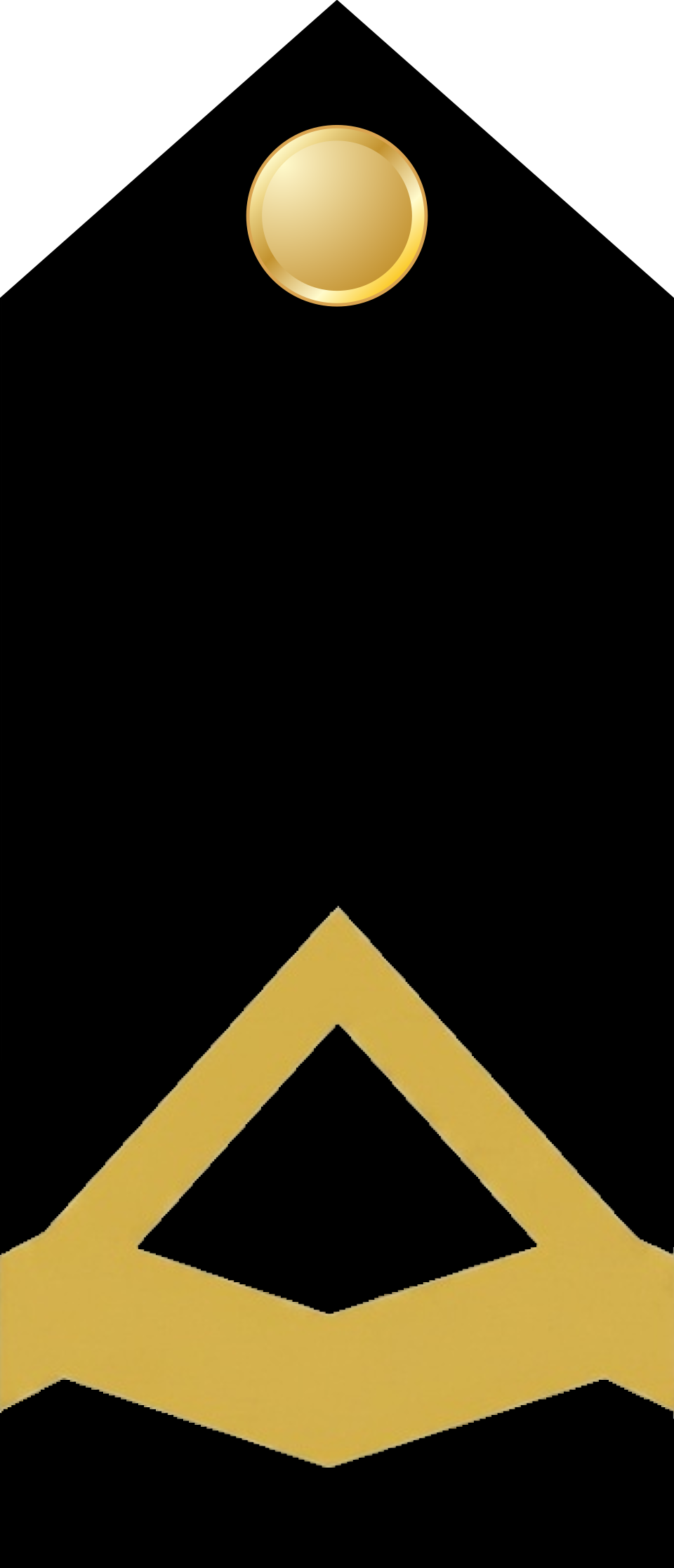
Auxiliary WO (Επίκουρος Αρχικελευστής) rank insignia

Probationary PO (Δόκιμος Κελευστής) insignia

== See also ==
- Hellenic Navy
- Greek military ranks
