= Royal Hellenic Air Force ranks =

This article contains the rank insignia of the Royal Hellenic Air Force (until 1973).

== Officer ranks ==
Rank group	General / flag officers					Senior officers			Junior officers
Royal Hellenic Air Force
Royal Hellenic Air Force	Ἀρχιπτέραρχος; Archiptérarchos	Πτέραρχος; Pterarchos	Αντιπτέραρχος; Antipterarchos	Υποπτέραρχος; Ypopterarchos	Ταξίαρχος; Taxiarchos	Σμήναρχος; Sminarchos	Αντισμήναρχος; Antisminarchos	Επισμηναγός; Episminagos	Σμηναγός; Sminagos	Υποσμηναγός; Yposminagos	Ανθυποσμηναγός; Anthyposminagos
Translation	Marshal of the Royal Hellenic Air Force (Note: The rank was instituted in the 20th century for King George II, and was held only by his successors, King Paul and King Constantine II.)	Air chief marshal	Air marshal	Air vice-marshal	Air commodore	Group captain	Wing commander	Squadron leader	Flight lieutenant	Flying officer	Pilot officer

== Other ranks ==
Rank group	Senior NCOs			Junior NCOs		Enlisted
Royal Hellenic Air Force				(Note: With 5 year contract)		No insignia
Royal Hellenic Air Force	Ανθυπασπιστής; Anthypaspistis	Επισμηνίας; Episminias	Σμηνίας; Sminias	Υποσμηνίας; Yposminias	Ἀνθυποσμηνίας; Anthyposminías	Σμηνίτης; Sminitis
Translation	Warrant officer	Master sergeant	Staff sergeant	Corporal	Lance corporal	Aircraftman

== See also ==
- Hellenic Air Force
- Greek military ranks
- Military of Greece
- Hellenic Army
  - Hellenic Army officer rank insignia
  - Hellenic Army enlisted rank insignia
- Hellenic Navy
- Comparative officer ranks of World War II
