= Ypotagmatarchis =

Hellenic Army rank

Ypotagmatarchis (Greek: υποταγματάρχης) was an army rank in the first table of organization of the Hellenic Army from the early part of the 19th century, from which it is first attested, to the mid-nineteenth century, when it was abolished. The ypotagmatarchis was the second-in-command of an under-strength battalion.

== Etymology ==
The word ypotagmatarchis comes from the preposition Greek: υπό, romanized: ipo + Greek: τάγμα, romanized: tagma (genitive τάγματος) + Greek: άρχω, romanized: arkho (to command). In current Greek military parlance, the related ταγματάρχης means major (literally "battalion commander").

In Anglophone armies, the most literal translation would be "Lieutenant-Major", which has only ever existed in fiction, viz. the rank of Lieutenant Major in the forces of the Galactic Republic in the Star Wars: The Old Republic video game. Another example is "Lieutenant Major Goose" in the television series Hey Arnold!, in the episode entitled New Teacher.

Outside the fictional realm, the ypotagmatarchis was similar in position to a regimental, battalion, or squadron adjutant in other militaries, except that the adjutant is an appointment, not a rank, with the occupant usually holding the rank of captain. Another comparison would be the aide-major of the ancien régime and revolutionary French Army, who assisted the major in charge of stores and expenses; except that both major and aide major were commisariat ranks, while the battalion was commanded by a capitaine-commandant. The difference here was that the ypotagmatarchis was a full deputy to the commandant, not restricted to matters of supply and pay, as the aide major was.

== History ==
The historic officer rank of ypotagmatarchis was between that of lochagos (captain) and tagmatarchis (major). The rank was in use from 1829 to 1863.

In July 1829, the then-Governor of the Hellenic State, Ioannis Kapodistrias, promoted the Deputy Chief of Staff of the Morea Expedition, Colonel Camille Alphonse Trézel to General and Commander of the regular army. Composed at that time of 2,688 men, General Trézel organized it "à la française", both for its administration and for its jurisdiction, for the training and for the advancement of the soldiers, and even for its uniforms which were the same than those of the French. In November 1829, General Trézel was replaced by General Gérard, who remained Commander of the regular Army until 1831.

After the Battle of Petra, Kapodistrias dispatched orders containing the first attempt at a harmonized framework for the Hellenic Army to the chiliarchs and published a listing of thirteen under-strength battalions to replace the previous chiliarch units. Areas of responsibility and competencies in these formations were defined as follows:

- Dioikitis (major, literally "commandant")
- Ipotagmatarchis (deputy commander of the battalion, literally "lieutenant major")
- Ypaspitis (with the rank of ypolochagos, literally "shield-bearer", i.e. "squire", hearkening back to hypaspists of Ancient Greece)
- Katalymatias (with the rank of ypolochagos, literally "quartermaster)
- Simaioforos (with the rank of anthypolochagos, literally "ensign"
- trumpeters and chaplain

For most of its existence, the rank of ypotagmatarchis co-existed with the rank of epilochagos (senior captain) which was introduced during the reign of Otto of Greece, although it had been proposed earlier. Epilochagos persisted until 1917, and became the next rank in line to tagmatarchis after the abolotion of ypotagmatarchis in 1863.
