= Taxiarches =

Taxiarches or its variant taxiarchos (from Greek: ταξιάρχης or ταξίαρχος), anglicized taxiarch, may refer to:

- Taxiarch, equivalent to brigadier in ancient and modern Greek military terminology
- Archangels Michael and Gabriel are called the Taxiarchs in Greek Orthodoxy because they lead the heavenly host

== Places ==
Several places in Greece are named after the archangels, either in singular, Taxiarchis, or in plural, Taxiarches (Ταξιάρχες):

- Taxiarches, Attica
- Taxiarchis, Aetolia-Acarnania
- Taxiarches, Achaea
- Taxiarchis, Grevena
- Taxiarchis, Chalkidiki
- Taxiarchis, Euboea
- Taxiarches, Drama
- Taxiarches, Elis
- Taxiarchis, Euboea
- Taxiarchis, Lesbos
- Taxiarches, Trikala
