= Tagmatarchis =

Greek military rank

Tagmatarchis, in more archaic context transliterated as Tagmatarches (Greek: Ταγματάρχης, abbreviated as Τχης), anglicized as Tagmatarch, is used in the Greek language to mean "Major". More precisely, it means "commander of a tagma" (τάγμα).

The rank dates to Antiquity and was also used in the Byzantine Empire. In the modern Hellenic Army, the rank is superior to a Lokhagos (Λοχαγός, captain) and inferior to an Antisyntagmatarchis (Αντισυνταγματάρχης, Lieutenant Colonel), and held either usually by battalion (tagma) executive officers (battalions are typically commanded by Lieutenant Colonels). In this case they are addressed as "Kyrie Ypodioikita" (Κύριε Υποδιοικητά), or simply as "Kyrie Tagmatarcha" (Κύριε Ταγματάρχα) in other cases.

Rank insignia of a Tagmatarchis, 1908–1936

Rank insignia of a Tagmatarchis, 1936–1970

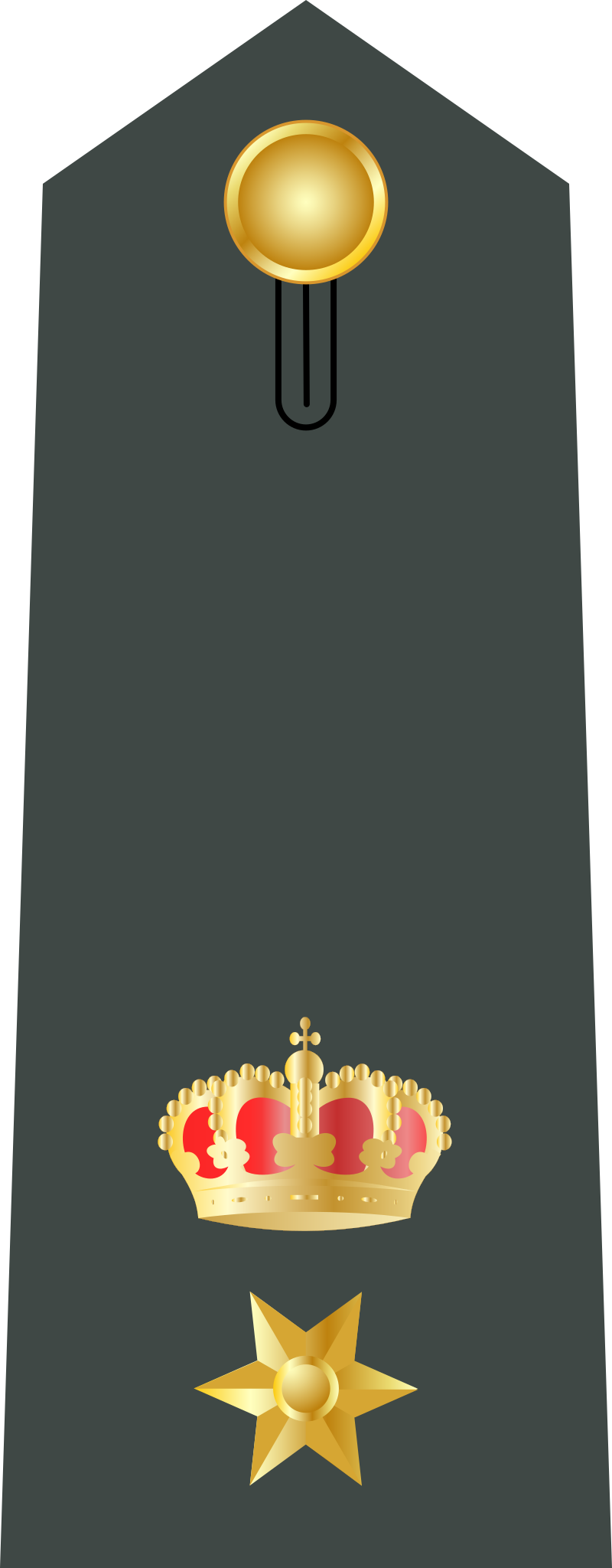
Rank insignia of a Tagmatarchis, 1970–1973

Current rank insignia of a Tagmatarchis, since 1975
