= Lochagos =

Greek term for a military captain

Lochagos (Greek: Λοχαγός; abbreviated Λγος) is used in the Greek language to mean "Captain". More precisely, it means "leader of a lochos". The equivalent term in the Hellenic Army Armour & Cavalry is ιλάρχος, ilarchos, 'leader of an ilē (cavalry troop)'.

== Ancient and Byzantine use ==
The term has been used since the times of Ancient Greece, where the place of the rank in the military hierarchy differed from city-state to city-state. For example, Xenophon reported that a lochagos of Sparta served under a polemarch. Aristotle reported that his counterpart in Athens served under a taxiarchos. In military manuals, the file is often called a lochos and as such its leader is also called a lochagos. Thus, the lochagos can also be the promachos protostates.

The rank of lochagos could also represent an officer roughly equivalent to that a Roman army centurion. The term was however also used by later writers to describe the civilian leader of a curia. The rank was still in use in the military of the Byzantine Empire, although more usually, the term hecatontarch was used, a calque of the Latin centurio. Certain early Byzantine units such as the infantry auxilia and the cavalry Scholae lacked centurions and decurions, but had centenarii and decenarii instead. These are mentioned both in the Strategikon of Maurice and by Jerome. Warren Treadgold interprets these to be a type of junior and senior centurion, a designation based on seniority and experience, not a distinction in rank.

== Modern use ==
In the modern Hellenic Army the rank is superior to an Ypolochagos (Lieutenant) and inferior to an Tagmatarchis (Major). The insignia consists of three silver stars.

=== Rank insignia ===
Rank insignia of a Lochagos, 1908–1936

Rank insignia of a Lochagos, 1937–1970

Current rank insignia of a Lochagos, since 1970
