= Ypolochagos =

Military rank

Current rank insignia of a Hellenic Army Ypolochagos.

Ypolochagos (Greek: Υπολοχαγός, abbreviated Υπλγος) is used in the modern Greek language to mean "First Lieutenant".

In the modern Hellenic Army the rank is superior to that of Anthypolochagos (Literally: 'In place of-Lieutenant', i.e. Second Lieutenant) and inferior to that of an Lochagos (Captain). The insignia consists of two silver stars. Officers holding this rank should be addressed as "Kyrie Ypolochage" (Κύριε Υπολοχαγέ) by their subordinates, or "Ypolochage + family name" by their superior officers.
