= Syntagmatarchis =

Syntagmatarchis Συνταγματάρχης
- Rank insignia
- Country: Greece
- Service branch: Hellenic Army; Hellenic Gendarmerie (till 1984)
- Abbreviation: Σχης
- NATO rank code: OF-5
- Next higher rank: Taxiarchos
- Next lower rank: Antisyntagmatarchis

Syntagmatarchis (Greek: Συνταγματάρχης; abbreviated Σχης), sometimes anglicised as Syntagmatarch, is used in modern Greek to denote the rank of colonel. It is translated as "leader of a regiment (syntagma)", and dates back to the Classical Age armies. However, the name is misleading in that the Hellenic Army retains very few regiments in its command structure. Thus, the typical responsibilities of Syntagmatarches are in staff positions, or as executive officers in brigades. Officers holding this rank should be addressed as Kyrie Syntagmatarcha (Κύριε Συνταγματάρχα).

In the modern Hellenic Army the rank is superior to an Antisyntagmatarchis (Lieutenant Colonel) and inferior to a Taxiarchos (Brigadier). The insignia consists of a flaming grenade and three golden stars.

The Greek junta, a military dictatorship which ruled the country from 1967 until 1974, is also known as "The Regime of the Colonels" because most of its chief leaders were of Colonel rank, including two of the three chief leaders, George Papadopoulos and Nikolaos Makarezos.

== Rank insignia ==
Rank insignia of a Syntagmatarchis, 1908–1936

Rank insignia of a Syntagmatarchis, 1937–1970

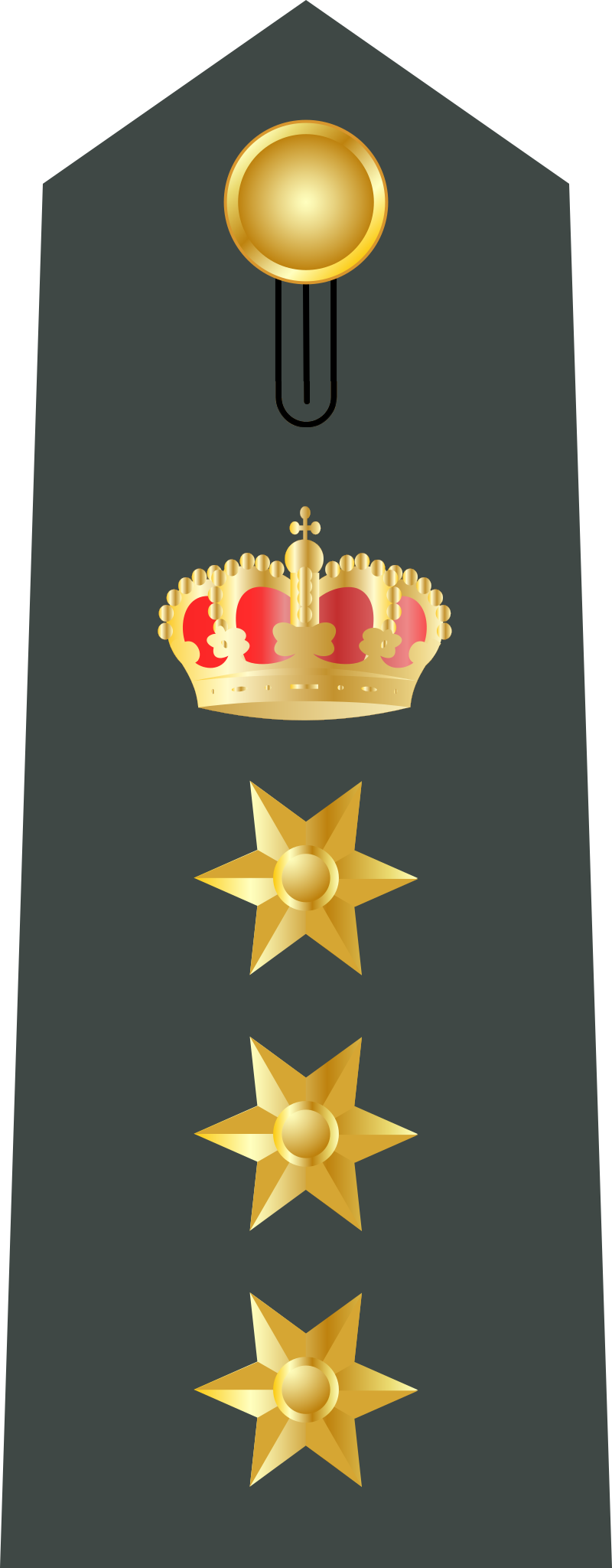
Rank insignia of a Syntagmatarchis, 1970–1973

Current rank insignia of a Syntagmatarchis, since 1975
