= Anthypolochagos =

Rank in the land forces of the Greek military

Anthypolochagos (Greek: Ανθυπολοχαγός, abbreviated Ανθλγός (Anthglos), equivalent to the NATO (OF-1), is the lowest commissioned officer rank in the Hellenic Army, except for the Armour-Cavalry Arm, and formerly, the Cavalry, in which it is called Anthypilarchos (Greek: Ανθυπίλαρχος, romanized: Anthypilarchos, abbrev. Ανθλχος (Anthlchos).

The equivalent rank is Simaiophoros (Ensign) in the Hellenic Navy, Anthyposminagos (Pilot Officer) in the Hellenic Air Force, and Ipastynomos (Inspector) in the Hellenic Police. The rank of anthypolochagos is also used in the Cypriot National Guard.

== Etymology ==
The word ανθυπολοχαγός is derived from the Greek words αντί, ύπο and λοχαγός. The preposition αντί, with the genitive or accusative case in noun phrases, or with the particle να in verb phrases, signifies "instead of". The preposition ύπο means "under" while the λοχαγός means "lochos leader", i.e. a captain, thus υπολοχαγός means "under-captain" — which can be compared to Captain lieutenant, and ανθυπολοχαγός means "replacement under-captain", compare sub-lieutenant.

Similarly, the term for cavalry captain, Greek: ίλαρχος, romanized: ilarchos, is derived from the Modern Greek word for a cavalry troop, Greek: ίλη, romanized: ili, later applied to armoured units after the conversion to Armoured cavalry. The ancestral Ancient Greek: ἴλη, romanized: ilē could mean a "band of men" or "cavalry troop", according to Arrian, properly numbering sixty-four men, especially when applied to the territorial squadrons of the Companion cavalry of the Ancient Macedonian army of Philip II. The Modern Greek word for a cavalry, armoured, or aerial squadron is moira, which also applies to Special forces, airborne and artillery battalions. The officer ranks subordinate to ilarchos derive their names in a similar process those subordinate to ypolochagos.

== Criteria for award of rank ==
Anthipolochagos or its equivalent is the lowest and highest rank, respectively, that can be obtained by graduates of the Hellenic Military Academy and the Corps Non-Commissioned Officers Academy, after four years of schooling for the former, and seventeen years later for the latter, at which time graduates are promoted anthipolochagos or anthipilarchos, depending on the rank borne by the arm in which they have been serving. Likewise, reserve officers are called anthipolochagi, as graduates of the Reserve Officers Academy, after a training period of four months duration, after which time they have been sufficiently educated in the tactics and leadership of their branches. During their probationary period, they are called Reserve Candidate Officers (Greek: Δόκιμος Έφεδρος Αξιωματικός, romanized: Dokimos Ephedros Anthypolochagos) and take the rank of Reserve Second Lieutenant (Greek: Έφεδρος Ανθυπολοχαγός, romanized: Ephedros Anthypolochagos) one-and-a-half months after their leaving the academy.

== Comparison to ranks in other armies ==
In Anglophone armies the rank is generally called Second lieutenant except in naval usage, where ensign or sub-lieutenant are used, and in a few cases where the archaic infantry rank of ensign is retained for historic reasons, viz. Canadian household regiments. In former times, the English-language equivalent rank to the cavalry anthipilarchos would have been cornet, which is still used as an internal form of address for a second lieutenant in the Household Cavalry and Queen's Royal Hussars.

== Rank insignia ==
Current rank insignia of a Hellenic Army Anthypolochagos

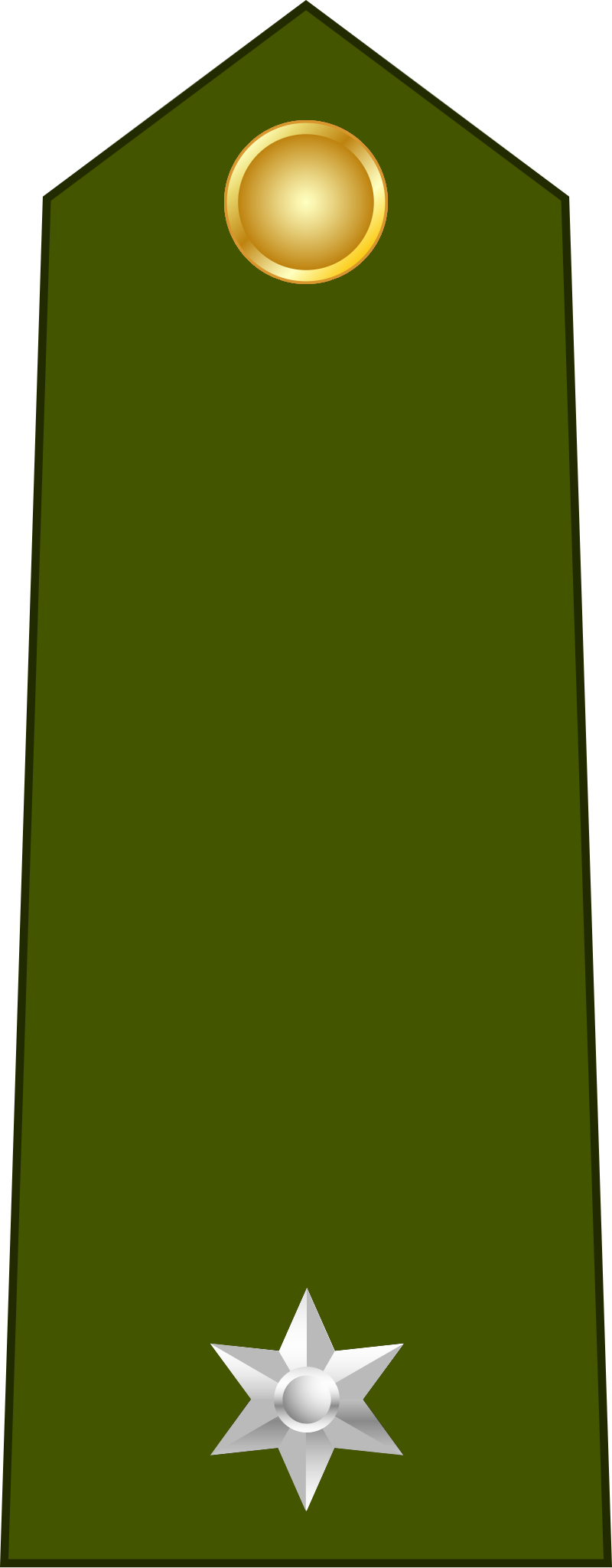
Current rank insignia of a Cypriot National Guard Anthypolochagos

== See also ==
- Ranks and insignia of NATO armies officers
- Ypotagmatarchis
