= Taxiarch =

Greek term for brigadier

The word taxiarch (Greek: ταξίαρχος, romanized: taxiarchos (masculine); ταξιάρχη, taxiarchē (feminine)) is used in the Greek language to mean "brigadier". The term derives from táxis 'order', in military context meaning 'an ordered formation'. It is cognate with the scientific term taxonomy. In turn, the rank has given rise to the Greek term for brigade, taxiarchia. In Greek Orthodox Church usage, the term is also applied to the archangels Michael and Gabriel, as leaders of the heavenly host, and several locations in Greece are named after them.

== Ancient use ==
In ancient Greece, the title or rank was held by a number of officers in the armies of several but not all city-states, with Sparta being a notable exception. In Classical Athens, there were ten taxiarchs, one for each of the city's tribes (phylai), a subordinate to the respective strategos.

== Byzantine use ==
The term first appears in use in the Byzantine army in the late 6th-century Strategikon of emperor Maurice, where it is reserved for the commander of the elite Optimatoi mercenary corps. In the 10th-century, the term was revived and refers to the commander of one of the new type of infantry brigade (taxiarchia), composed of 500 heavy infantry, 300 archers and 200 light infantry. On account of their numerical size, these units were also known as chiliarchia, and their commander correspondingly as chiliarchos, and are also equated to the thematic droungos under a droungarios. During the 11th century, with the demise of the thematic armies, the rank rose in importance, and eventually surpassed and replaced that of tourmarches, so that in the Komnenian-era army, the taxiarchia was the largest-scale permanent infantry formation.

== Modern use ==
In the modern Hellenic Army the rank of Taxiarchos (abbreviated Ταξχος) is equivalent to Brigadier General with a NATO Code OF-6. The rank was introduced in the Greek military by royal decree on 5 June 1946, and the insignia instituted later in the same year. It is superior to a Syntagmatarchis (Colonel) and inferior to an Ypostratigos (Major General). The rank's insignia consists of a flaming grenade (replacing the crown borne under the Greek monarchy), a crossed sword and baton device and a six-pointed star. A Taxiarchos typically serves as the commanding officer of a brigade or as the executive officer of a division.

In the Hellenic Air Force, which otherwise uses a unique system of ranks (that differ from those of the army), the equivalent rank is Taxiarchos tis Aeroporias or simply Taxiarchos. While Taxiarchos tis Aeroporias in English, is literally "Air Force Brigadier", due to historical links with the Royal Air Force (RAF), it is sometimes translated into English as Air Commodore – the RAF equivalent. Like other Hellenic Air Force ranks, the insignia are also based on those of its RAF equivalent.

The rank is also used by the Hellenic Police (and the Greek Gendarmerie before) and the Cypriot National Guard.

=== Gallery ===
Rank insignia of a Taxiarchos, 1946–1959

Rank insignia of a Taxiarchos, 1959–1970

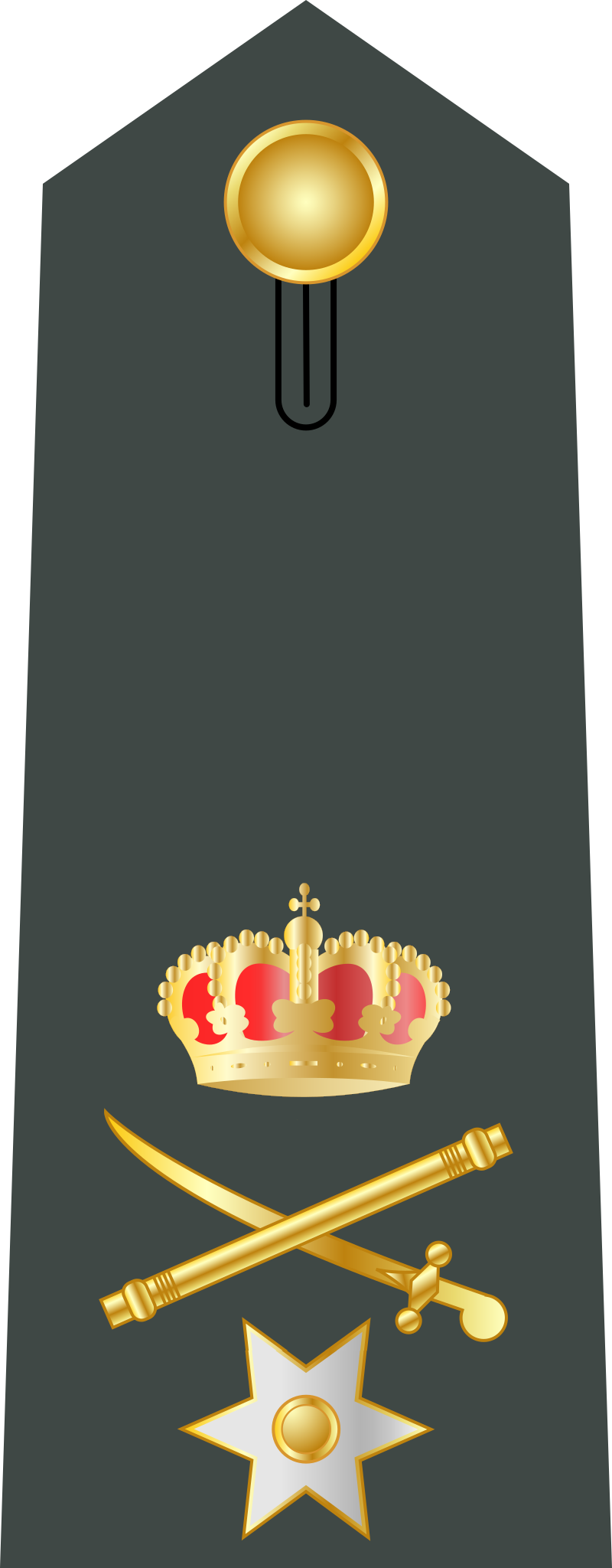
Rank insignia of a Taxiarchos, 1970–1973

Rank insignia of a Taxiarchos, 1975–today

Rank insignia of a Taxiarchos tis Aeroporias, 1946–today

Rank insignia of a Police Taxiarchos, 1986–today
