= Bibliography of Greece =

This bibliography of Greece is a list of books in the English language which reliable sources indicate relate to the general topic of Greece.

- Alexander, Caroline – The war that killed Achilles: the true story of Homer's Iliad.
- Alexander the Great: a new history.
- Alexander the Great: selected texts from Arrian, Curtius and Plutarch.
- Annas, Julia – Ancient philosophy: a very short introduction.
- Annas, Julia – Plato: a very short introduction.
- Aristotle – Politics.
- Armstrong, Karen – The great transformation: the beginning of our religious traditions.
- Atsaides, Susie – Greek generations: a medley of ethnic recipes, folklore, and village traditions.
- Bagnall, Nigel – The Peloponnesian War: Athens, Sparta and the struggle for Greece.
- Barnes, Jonathan – Aristotle: a very short introduction.
- Beard, Mary – The Parthenon.
- Beaton, Roderick – George Seferis: waiting for the angel: a biography.
- Barard, Claude – A city of images: iconography and society in ancient Greece.
- Bernal, Martin – Black Athena writes back: Martin Bernal responds to his critics.
- Bertman, Stephen – The genesis of science: the story of Greek imagination.
- Billows, Richard A. – Marathon: the battle that changed western civilization.
- Bowden, Hugh – Mystery cults of the ancient world.
- Bowlby, Linda S. – Renaissance woman: a study of women's roles throughout history with accompanying works of art.
- Bradford, Ernie – Thermopylae: the battle for the West.
- Brewer, David – Greece, the hidden centuries: Turkish rule from the fall of Constantinople to Greek independence.
- Broad, William J. – The oracle: ancient Delphi and the science behind its lost secrets.
- Budin, Stephanie Lynn – The ancient Greeks: an introduction.
- Burckhardt, Jacob – The Greeks and Greek civilization.
- Buxton, R. G. A. – The complete world of Greek mythology.
- Cahill, Thomas – Sailing the wine-dark sea: why the Greeks matter.
- Camp, John – The Athenian Agora: excavations in the heart of classical Athens.
- Camp, John – The world of the ancient Greeks.
- Cantor, Norman F. – Alexander the Great: journey to the end of the earth.
- Cantor, Norman F. – Antiquity: from the birth of Sumerian civilization to the fall of the Roman Empire.
- Capponi, Niccolo – The victory of the west: the great Christian-Muslim clash at the battle of Lepanto.
- Carroll, Michael – An island in Greece: on the shores of Skopelos.
- Cartledge, Paul – Alexander the Great: the hunt for a new past.
- Cartledge, Paul – Ancient Greece: a history in eleven cities.
- Cartledge, Paul – The Spartans: the world of the warrior-heroes of ancient Greece, from utopia to crisis and collapse.
- Cartledge, Paul – Thermopylae: the battle that changed the world.
- Castleden, Rodney – Minoans: life in Bronze Age Crete.
- Castleden, Rodney – Mycenaeans.
- Clark, Bruce – Twice A Stranger: How Mass Expulsion Forged Modern Greece and Turkey.
- Connelly, Joan Breton – Portrait of a priestess: women and ritual in ancient Greece.
- Connolly, Peter – Greece and Rome at war.
- Cottrell, Leonard – The bull of Minos: the great discoveries of ancient Greece.
- Crane, David – Lord Byron's jackal: a life of Edward John Trelawny.
- Crowley, Roger – Empires of the sea: the siege of Malta, the Battle of Lepanto, and the contest for the center of the world.
- Cunliffe, Barry W. – The extraordinary voyage of Pytheas the Greek.
- Curtis, Gregory – Disarmed: the story of the Venus de Milo.
- Dalby, Andrew – Rediscovering Homer: inside the origins of the epic.
- Davidson, James N. – Courtesans & fishcakes: the consuming passions of classical Athens.
- Davidson, James N. – The Greeks and Greek love: a bold new exploration of the ancient world.
- Davis, L. J. – Onassis: Aristotle and Christina.
- Dempster, Nigel – Heiress: the story of Christina Onassis.
- Dinsmoor, William Bell – The architecture of ancient Greece: an account of its historic development.
- Dodge, Theodore Ayrault – Alexander: a history of the origin and growth of the art of war from the earliest times to the Battle of Ipsus, 301 BC, with a detailed account of the campaigns of the great Macedonian.
- Doherty, P. C. – The death of Alexander the Great: what – or who --really killed the young conqueror of the known world?
- Durando, Furio – Ancient Greece: the dawn of the Western world.
- Durrell, Lawrence – Blue thirst.
- Durrell, Lawrence – The Greek Islands.
- Durrell, Lawrence – The Lawrence Durrell travel reader.
- Durrell, Lawrence – Prospero's cell: a guide to the landscape and manners of the island of Corcyra.
- Durrell, Lawrence – Reflections on a marine Venus: a companion to the landscape of Rhodes.
- Emerson, Mary – Greek sanctuaries: an introduction.
- Evans, Peter – Ari: the life and times of Aristotle Socrates Onassis.
- Evans, Peter – Nemesis: the true story of Aristotle Onassis, Jackie O, and the love triangle that brought down the Kennedys.
- Ferguson, Kitty – The music of Pythagoras: how an ancient brotherhood cracked the code of the universe and lit the path from antiquity to outer space.
- Fermor, Patrick Leigh – Mani: Travels in the Southern Peloponnese
- Fermor, Patrick Leigh – Roumeli: travels in northern Greece.
- Fields, Nic – Ancient Greek fortifications 500—300 BC.
- Fone, Byrne R. S. – Homophobia: A History.
- Foreman, Laura – Alexander the conqueror: the epic story of the warrior king.
- Fox, Robin Lane – Alexander the Great.
- Fox, Robin Lane – Travelling heroes: in the epic age of Homer.
- France, Peter – A place of healing for the soul: Patmos.
- Freely, John – Aladdin's lamp: how Greek science came to Europe through the Islamic world.
- Freeman, Charles – The Greek achievement: the foundation of the Western world.
- Freeman, Philip – The philosopher and the Druids: a journey among the ancient Celts.
- Freke, Timothy – The Jesus mysteries: Was the 'Original Jesus' a Pagan God?
- Fuller, J. F. C. – The generalship of Alexander the Great.
- Gage, Eleni N. – North of Ithaka: a journey home through a family's extraordinary past.
- Gage, Nicholas – Eleni.
- Gage, Nicholas – Greek fire: the story of Maria Callas and Aristotle Onassis.
- Gage, Nicholas – A place for us.
- Gere, Cathy – Knossos and the prophets of modernism.
- Gere, Cathy – The tomb of Agamemnon.
- Gerolymatos, Andre – Red acropolis, black terror: the Greek Civil War and the origins of Soviet-American rivalry.
- Glatt, John – Blind passion: a true story of seduction, obsession, and murder.
- Grainger, John D. – Alexander the great failure: the collapse of the Macedonian Empire.
- Grant, Michael – The founders of the western world: a history of Greece and Rome.
- Grant, Michael – The rise of the Greeks.
- Grant, Michael – The visible past: an archaeological reinterpretation of the ancient world.
- The great naturalists.
- Greece: temples, tombs, & treasures.
- Greece: true stories.
- Green, Peter – Alexander of Macedon, 356-323 B.C.: a historical biography.
- Green, Peter – Ancient Greece: an illustrated history.
- Green, Peter – The Hellenistic age: a history.
- Green, Roger – Hydra and the bananas of Leonard Cohen: a search for serenity in the sun.
- Hale, John R. – Lords of the sea: the epic story of the Athenian navy and the birth of democracy.
- Hamel, Debra – Trying Neaira: The True Story of a Courtesan's Scandalous Life in Ancient Greece.
- Hamilton, Edith – The Greek way.
- Hanson, Victor Davis – A War Like No Other: How the Athenians and Spartans Fought the Peloponnesian War.
- Hanson, Victor Davis – Ripples of Battle: How Wars Fought Long Ago Still Determine How We Fight, How We Live, and How We Think.
- Hanson, Victor Davis – The Wars of the Ancient Greeks: And the Invention of Western Military Culture.
- Hanson, Victor Davis – The Other Greeks: The Family Farm and the Agrarian Roots of Western Civilization
- Harrison, Thomas – Greek religion: belief and experience.
- Herodotus – The Histories.
- Herodotus – Snakes with wings and gold-digging ants.
- Higgins, Charlotte – It's All Greek to Me: from Homer to the Hippocratic Oath, how Ancient Greece has shaped our world.
- Hill, Maria – Diggers and Greeks: the Australian campaigns in Greece and Crete.
- Hillman, D. C. A. – The chemical muse: drug use and the roots of Western civilization.
- Hirshfeld, Alan – Eureka man: the life and legacy of Archimedes.
- Hitchens, Christopher – The Elgin marbles: should they be returned to Greece?
- Hoffman, Susanna – The olive and the caper: adventures in Greek cooking.
- Holland, Tom – Persian Fire: The First World Empire and the Battle for the West.
- Homer – The Odyssey.
- Hopkins, T. C. F. – Confrontation at Lepanto: Christendom vs. Islam.
- Hughes, Bettany – Helen of Troy: Goddess, Princess, Whore.
- Huler, Scott – No man's lands: one man's odyssey through The Odyssey.
- Kagan, Donald – The Peloponnesian War.
- Kagan, Donald – Pericles of Athens and the birth of democracy.
- Kagan, Donald – Thucydides: the reinvention of history.
- Kakis, Frederic J. – Legacy of courage: a Holocaust survival story in Greece.
- Keuls, Eva C. – The reign of the phallus: sexual politics in ancient Athens.
- Kidd, Sue Monk – Traveling with Pomegranates: a mother daughter story.
- Kirtsoglou, Elisabeth – For the love of women: gender, identity and same-sex relations in a Greek provincial town.
- Kulukundis, Elias – The feasts of memory: stories of a Greek family.
- Kurke, Lance B. – The wisdom of Alexander the Great: enduring leadership lessons from the man who created an empire.
- Lawrence, A. W. – Greek architecture.
- Leon, Vicki – How to mellify a corpse: and other human stories of ancient science & superstition.
- Lloyd, Alan – Marathon: the story of civilizations on collision course.
- Lundberg, David – Olympic wandering: time travel through Greece.
- MacKendrick, Paul Lachlan – The Greek Stones Speak: the story of archaeology in Greek lands.
- Marchand, Jo – Decoding the heavens: a 2,000-year-old computer – and the century-long search to discover its secrets.
- Martin, Thomas R. – Ancient Greece: from prehistoric to Hellenistic times.
- Mason, David – News from the Village: Aegean friends.
- Matyszak, Philip – The classical compendium: a miscellany of scandalous gossip, bawdy jokes, peculiar facts, and bad behavior from the ancient Greeks and Romans.
- Mazower, Mark – Salonica, City of Ghosts: Christians, Muslims, and Jews, 1430–1950.
- Mazur, Joseph – The Motion Paradox: The 2,500-Year-Old Puzzle Behind All the Mysteries of Time and Space.
- Michalopoulos, Dimitri, Homer's Odyssey beyond the myths, The Piraeus: Institute of Hellenic Maritime History, 2016. ISBN 978-618-80599-3-1
- Michas, Takis – Unholy Alliance: Greece and Milosevic's Serbia.
- Miller, Stephen G. – Ancient Greek athletics.
- Moore-Pastides, Patricia – Greek revival: cooking for life.
- Moorehead, Caroline – Lost and found: the 9,000 treasures of Troy: Heinrich Schliemann and the gold that got away.
- Moutsatsos, Kiki Feroudi – The Onassis women: an eyewitness account.
- Myer, Will – People of the storm god: travels in Macedonia.
- Navia, Luis E. – Socrates: a life examined.
- The New Acropolis Museum.
- O'Brien, John Maxwell – Alexander the Great: the invisible enemy: a biography.
- Osborne, Catherine – Presocratic philosophy: a very short introduction.
- Pellegrino, Charles R. – Unearthing Atlantis: an archaeological odyssey to the fabled lost civilization.
- Perrottet, Tony – The naked Olympics: the true story of the ancient games.
- Perrottet, Tony – Pagan holiday: on the trail of ancient Roman tourists.
- Phelps, Michael – No Limits: The Will to Succeed.
- Phillips, Graham – Alexander the Great: Murder in Babylon.
- Pickover, Clifford A. – Archimedes to Hawking: Laws of Science and the Great Minds Behind Them.
- Plutarch – Greek lives: a selection of nine Greek lives.
- Poirier-Bures, Simone – That shining place.
- Pomeroy, Sarah B. – The murder of Regilla: a case of domestic violence in antiquity.
- Prevas, John – Envy of the Gods: Alexander the Great's ill-fated journey across Asia.
- Raeburn, Nancy – Mykonos.
- Raphael, Frederic – Some Talk of Alexander: A Journey Through Space and Time in the Greek World.
- Renault, Mary – The Nature of Alexander.
- Rodgers, Nigel – The rise and fall of ancient Greece: the military and political History of the ancient Greeks from the fall of Troy, the Persian Wars and the Battle of Marathon to the campaigns of Alexan.
- Rogers, Guy MacLean – Alexander: the ambiguity of greatness.
- Sarrinikalaou, George – Facing Athens: encounters with the modern city.
- Saunders, Nicholas J. – Alexander's Tomb: the two thousand year obsession to find the lost conqueror.
- Scott, Michael – From democrats to kings: the brutal dawn of a new world from the downfall of Athens to the rise of Alexander the Great.
- Seferis, George – Six Nights on the Acropolis.
- Sidebottom, Harry – Ancient Warfare: a very short introduction.
- Silver, Vernon – The lost chalice: the epic hunt for a priceless masterpiece.
- Simon, Bennet – Mind and Madness in Ancient Greece: The Classical Roots of Modern Psychiatry
- Sissa, Giulia - Sex and sensuality in the ancient world.
- Spawforth, Antony - The complete Greek temples.
- Spivey, Nigel Jonathan – The Ancient Olympics: War minus the shooting.
- Stefano, Maggi – Greece: history and treasures of an ancient civilization.
- Stone, Tom – The summer of my Greek taverna.
- Stone, Tom – Zeus: a journey through Greece in the footsteps of a god.
- Stoneman, Richard – Alexander the Great: a life in legend.
- Strauss, Barry S. – The Battle of Salamis: the naval encounter that saved Greece — and Western civilization.
- Strauss, Barry S. – The Trojan War: a new history.
- Taylor, C. C. W. – Socrates: a very short introduction.
- Taylour, William – The Mycenaeans.
- Thompson, Michael – Granicus 334 BC: Alexander's first Persian victory.
- Thubron, Colin – The Ancient Mariners.
- Thucydides – History of the Peloponnesian War.
- Thucydides – The landmark Thucydides: a comprehensive guide to the Peloponnesian War.
- Thucydides – The Peloponnesian War: a new translation, backgrounds, interpretations.
- Treston, Hubert Joseph, Poine: a study in ancient Greek blood-vengeance. Published United Kingdom: Longmans, Green and Co., 1923
- Van der Kiste, John – Kings of the Hellenes: the Greek Kings, 1863–1974.
- Vandenberg, Philipp – Mysteries of the oracles: the last secrets of antiquity.
- Veyne, Paul – Bread and circuses: historical sociology and political pluralism.
- Vickers, Hugo – Alice: Princess Andrew of Greece.
- Vlanton, Elias – Who killed George Polk?: the press covers up a death in the family.
- von Däniken, Erich – Odyssey of the Gods — An Alien History of Ancient Greece.
- Vrettos, Theodore – The Elgin affair: the abduction of Antiquity's greatest treasures and the passions it aroused.
- Wallechinsky, David – The Complete Book of the Summer Olympics: Athens 2004.
- Warry, John Gibson – Warfare in the classical world: an illustrated encyclopedia of weapons, warriors, and warfare in the ancient civilizations of Greece and Rome.
- Wasson, R. Gordon – The Road to Eleusus: Unveiling the Secret of the mysteries.
- Waterfield, Robin – Athens: From Ancient Ideal to Modern City.
- Waterfield, Robin – Why Socrates Died: Dispelling the Myths.
- Watefield, Robin – Xenophon's Retreat: Greece, Persia, and the End of the Golden Age
- What life was like at the dawn of democracy: classical Athens, 525–322 BC.
- Wheatley, Nadia – The Life and Myth of Chairman Clift.
- Wood, Ellen Meiksins – Citizens to Lords: A Social History of Western Political Thought from Antiquity to the Middle Ages.
- Wood, Michael – In the Footsteps of Alexander the Great: a journey from Greece to Asia.
- Woodruff, Paul – First Democracy: The Challenge of an Ancient Idea.
- Wright, William – All the pain that money can buy: the life of Christina Onassis.
- Xenophon – The Expedition of Cyrus.
- Xenophon – The Landmark Xenophon's Hellenika: a new translation.
- Xenophon – The Persian Expedition.
- Zinovieff, Sofka – Eurydice Street: A Place in Athens.
