= Aspropyrgos =

Aspropyrgos Ασπρόπυργος
- Municipality
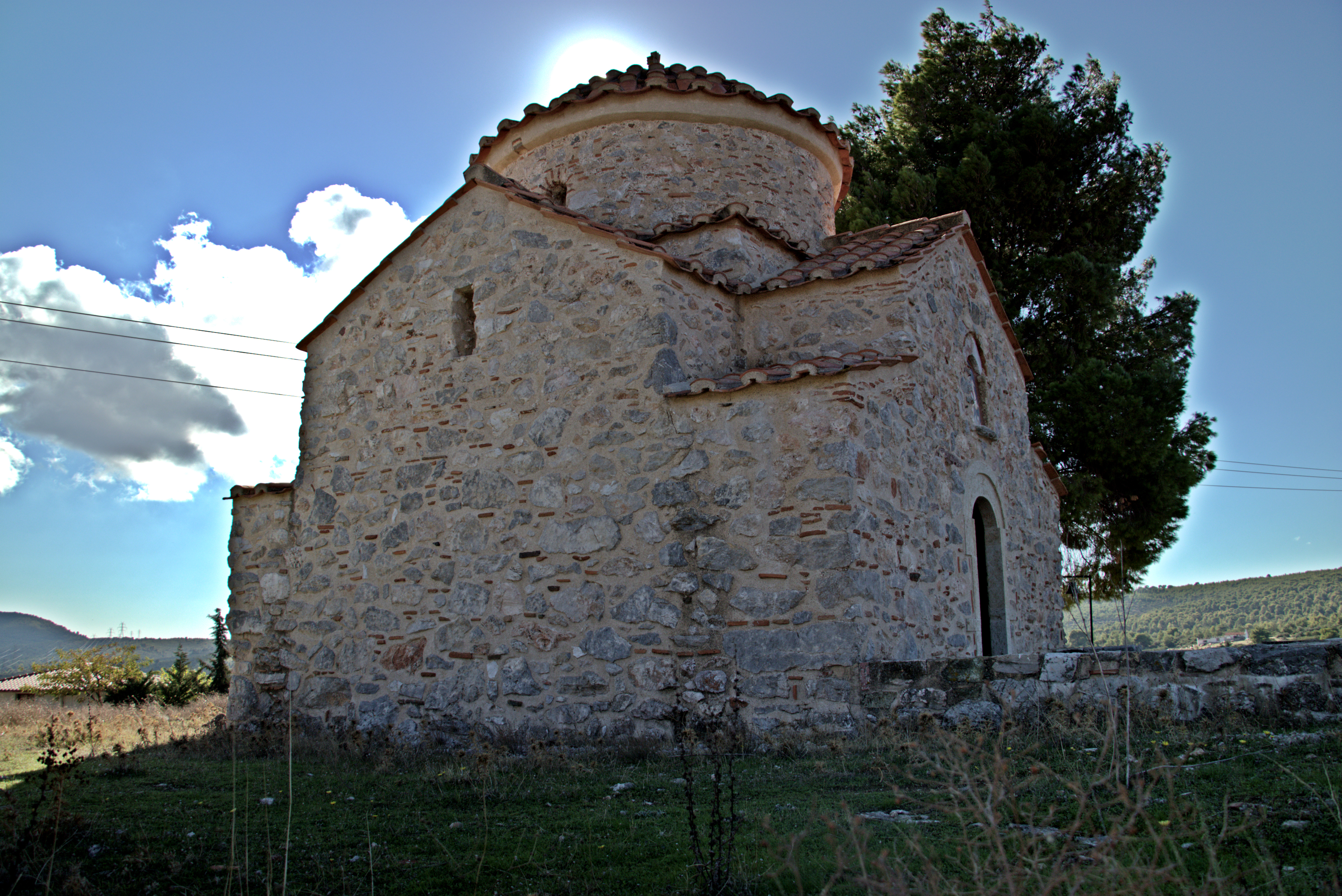

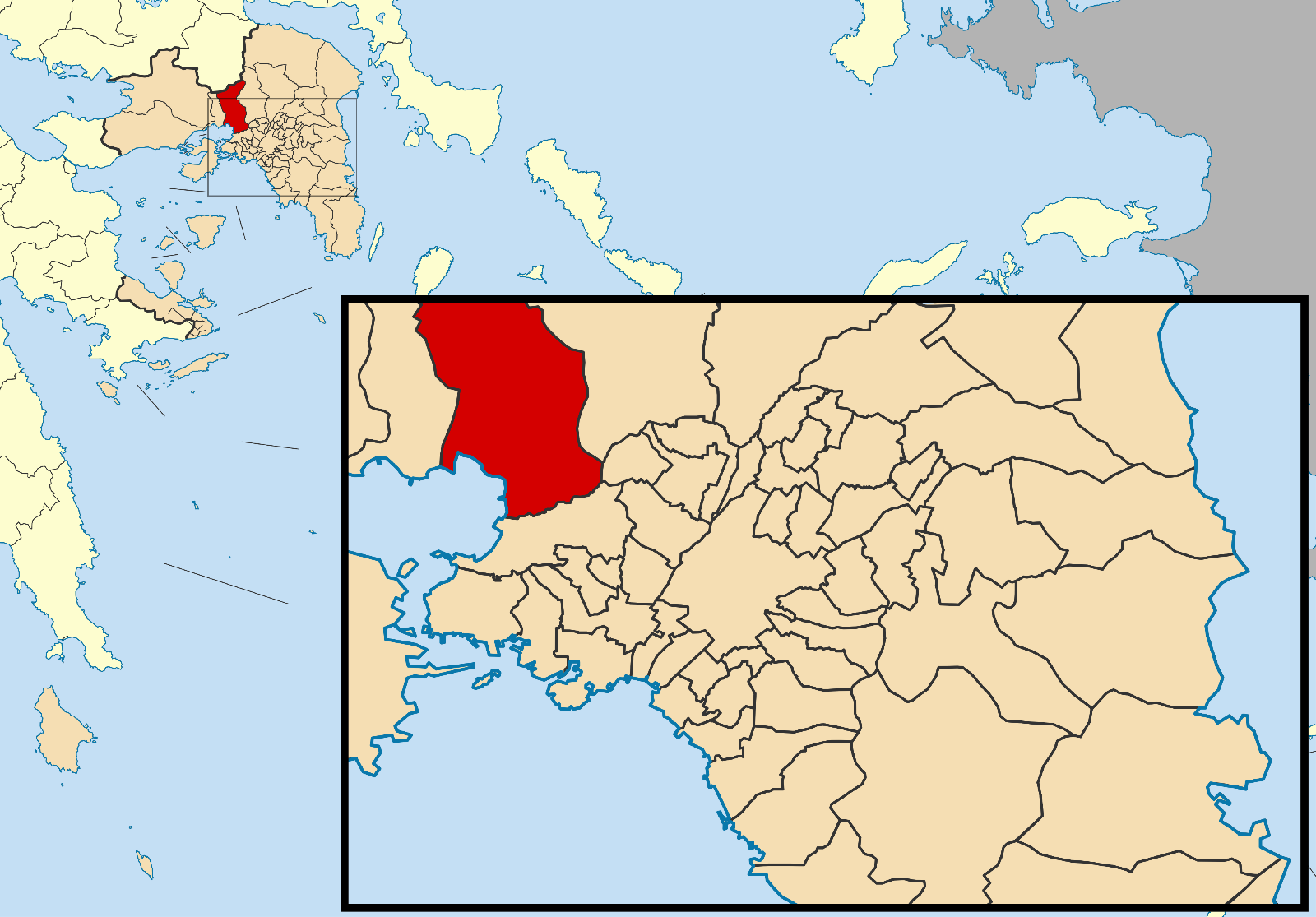

- Location within Greece
- Coordinates: 38°4′N 23°35′E
- Country: Greece
- Administrative region: Attica
- Regional unit: West Attica

Government
  - Mayor: Ioannis Ilias (since 2023)

Area
  - Municipality: 101.98 km^{2} (39.37 sq mi)
- Elevation: 9 m (30 ft)

Population (2021)
  - Municipality: 31,381
  - Density: 307.72/km^{2} (796.98/sq mi)
- Time zone: UTC+2 (EET)
  - Summer (DST): UTC+3 (EEST)
- Postal code: 193 00
- Area code: 210
- Vehicle registration: Z
- Website: www.aspropyrgos.gr

Aspropyrgos (Greek: Ασπρόπυργος, pronounced [aˈspropirɣos], before 1899: Καλύβια Χασιάς, Kalyvia Chasias) is a western suburb, in the Athens metropolitan area and a municipality in the West Attica regional unit in the Thriasio Plain, Attica, Greece. The municipality had a population of 31,381 at the 2021 census. It has an area of 101.983 km^{2}.

== Etymology ==
The name 'Aspropyrgos' is derived from the Greek words άσπρο, meaning 'white', and πύργος, meaning 'castle' or 'tower'.

== Geography ==
Aspropyrgos is located 15 km northwest of the city center of Athens in the Thriasio Plain. It is 5 km northeast of Elefsina, near the Saronic Gulf coast. Mount Parnitha forms its northern border, and the Aigaleo hills its southeastern border. The Elefsina Military Airbase lies to its west. The main street is Dimokratias ('Democracy') Avenue. Aspropyrgos can be accessed from the A6 motorway (Elefsina - Athens International Airport) and the A65 motorway (Ano Liosia - Aspropyrgos). It is also accessible through A6 exit 4. (The industrial area is in the southeastern part of Aspropyrgos. The Aspropyrgos railway station is served by Proastiakos trains from the Athens International Airport to Kiato (Peloponnese).

== Climate ==
Aspropyrgos has a hot semi-arid climate (Köppen climate classification: BSh) closely bordering a hot-summer mediterranean (Csa) climate, with mild winters and hot summers. Owing to its location in the Thriasio Plain the area is particularly vulnerable to high temperatures and has experienced some of the highest temperatures ever recorded in Greece and Continental Europe. In June 2007 the meteorological station of the Aspropyrgos Municipality located in the Germanika area of Aspropyrgos registered 47.5 °C which is Europe's highest June temperature to date. Also, in June 2017, July 2017 and August 2021, Aspropyrgos recorded temperatures of around 45 °C. In August 2025 a new meteorological station from the National Observatory of Athens was placed in the Aspropyrgos coast.

Climate data for Aspropyrgos 45 m a.s.l.
Month	Jan	Feb	Mar	Apr	May	Jun	Jul	Aug	Sep	Oct	Nov	Dec	Year
Record high °C (°F)	23.7 (74.7)	23.6 (74.5)	25.7 (78.3)	31.2 (88.2)	37.7 (99.9)	44.6 (112.3)	44.9 (112.8)	44.8 (112.6)	40.8 (105.4)	32.7 (90.9)	28.3 (82.9)	22.4 (72.3)	44.9 (112.8)
Mean daily maximum °C (°F)	13.6 (56.5)	15.2 (59.4)	17.7 (63.9)	21.9 (71.4)	26.5 (79.7)	31.8 (89.2)	34.9 (94.8)	34.1 (93.4)	29.9 (85.8)	24.6 (76.3)	20.1 (68.2)	15.7 (60.3)	23.8 (74.9)
Daily mean °C (°F)	9.9 (49.8)	11.4 (52.5)	13.6 (56.5)	17.2 (63.0)	21.7 (71.1)	26.9 (80.4)	30.1 (86.2)	29.7 (85.5)	25.6 (78.1)	20.6 (69.1)	16.4 (61.5)	12.2 (54.0)	19.6 (67.3)
Mean daily minimum °C (°F)	6.1 (43.0)	7.6 (45.7)	9.4 (48.9)	12.5 (54.5)	16.9 (62.4)	22.0 (71.6)	25.3 (77.5)	25.3 (77.5)	21.2 (70.2)	16.8 (62.2)	12.7 (54.9)	8.7 (47.7)	15.4 (59.7)
Record low °C (°F)	−2.5 (27.5)	−1.1 (30.0)	−0.1 (31.8)	4.3 (39.7)	11.5 (52.7)	14.3 (57.7)	18.2 (64.8)	19.9 (67.8)	13.9 (57.0)	8.2 (46.8)	4.4 (39.9)	0.3 (32.5)	−2.5 (27.5)
Average rainfall mm (inches)	52.3 (2.06)	40.6 (1.60)	28.9 (1.14)	20.2 (0.80)	14.3 (0.56)	18.3 (0.72)	5.5 (0.22)	7.9 (0.31)	31.0 (1.22)	32.7 (1.29)	54.4 (2.14)	71.8 (2.83)	377.9 (14.89)
Source: National Observatory of Athens Monthly Bulletins (Dec 2014-Jul 2025) and World Meteorological Organization

Climate data for Aspropyrgos Coast (7 m a.s.l.) Climate: Hot-summer Mediterranean climate (Csa) • USDA: 9b (-2.0°C)
Month	Jan	Feb	Mar	Apr	May	Jun	Jul	Aug	Sep	Oct	Nov	Dec	Year
Record high °C (°F)	20.6 (69.1)	20.6 (69.1)	20.3 (68.5)	27.6 (81.7)	32.1 (89.8)	38.1 (100.6)	38.4 (101.1)	39.6 (103.3)	38.6 (101.5)	28.4 (83.1)	24.7 (76.5)	19.4 (66.9)	39.6 (103.3)
Mean daily maximum °C (°F)	15.7 (60.3)	17.2 (63.0)	17.6 (63.7)	22.4 (72.3)	26.8 (80.2)	33.5 (92.3)	35.2 (95.4)	35.6 (96.1)	31.9 (89.4)	23.8 (74.8)	22.0 (71.6)	17.0 (62.6)	24.9 (76.8)
Daily mean °C (°F)	11.3 (52.3)	12.7 (54.9)	12.2 (54.0)	17.0 (62.6)	20.8 (69.4)	27.5 (81.5)	29.2 (84.6)	30.1 (86.2)	26.2 (79.2)	19.1 (66.4)	18.1 (64.6)	12.4 (54.3)	19.7 (67.5)
Mean daily minimum °C (°F)	6.9 (44.4)	8.1 (46.6)	6.8 (44.2)	11.6 (52.9)	14.7 (58.5)	21.5 (70.7)	23.2 (73.8)	24.6 (76.3)	20.5 (68.9)	14.3 (57.7)	14.1 (57.4)	7.7 (45.9)	14.5 (58.1)
Record low °C (°F)	−2.0 (28.4)	3.4 (38.1)	2.9 (37.2)	8.0 (46.4)	5.2 (41.4)	16.9 (62.4)	17.0 (62.6)	19.7 (67.5)	15.9 (60.6)	9.9 (49.8)	8.3 (46.9)	2.9 (37.2)	−2.0 (28.4)
Average rainfall mm (inches)	130.6 (5.14)	104.6 (4.12)	21.6 (0.85)	64.0 (2.52)	25.4 (1.00)	0.4 (0.02)	26.2 (1.03)	0.0 (0.0)	6.0 (0.24)	50.6 (1.99)	70.6 (2.78)	169.8 (6.69)	669.8 (26.38)
Source: National Observatory of Athens Monthly Bulletins (Aug 2025-Aug 2026) and World Meteorological Organization

Climate data for Aspropyrgos Oil Refinery 15 m a.s.l.
Month	Jan	Feb	Mar	Apr	May	Jun	Jul	Aug	Sep	Oct	Nov	Dec	Year
Record high °C (°F)	20.8 (69.4)	18.4 (65.1)	25.7 (78.3)	30.6 (87.1)	30.8 (87.4)	42.2 (108.0)	44.0 (111.2)	42.4 (108.3)	38.1 (100.6)	31.0 (87.8)	23.4 (74.1)	20.8 (69.4)	44.0 (111.2)
Mean daily maximum °C (°F)	16.9 (62.4)	13.4 (56.1)	19.7 (67.5)	21.3 (70.3)	27.5 (81.5)	35.2 (95.4)	37.6 (99.7)	35.9 (96.6)	31.2 (88.2)	26.0 (78.8)	18.3 (64.9)	16.8 (62.2)	25.0 (77.0)
Daily mean °C (°F)	11.6 (52.9)	9.1 (48.4)	13.8 (56.8)	15.5 (59.9)	21.4 (70.5)	28.0 (82.4)	31.1 (88.0)	30.1 (86.2)	25.4 (77.7)	20.5 (68.9)	14.6 (58.3)	12.2 (54.0)	19.4 (67.0)
Mean daily minimum °C (°F)	6.2 (43.2)	4.8 (40.6)	7.9 (46.2)	9.7 (49.5)	15.2 (59.4)	20.8 (69.4)	24.6 (76.3)	24.2 (75.6)	19.5 (67.1)	15.0 (59.0)	10.9 (51.6)	7.5 (45.5)	13.9 (57.0)
Record low °C (°F)	2.3 (36.1)	−1.9 (28.6)	0.1 (32.2)	1.1 (34.0)	11.5 (52.7)	14.7 (58.5)	19.3 (66.7)	19.0 (66.2)	14.0 (57.2)	10.4 (50.7)	1.1 (34.0)	2.7 (36.9)	−1.9 (28.6)
Average rainfall mm (inches)	62.5 (2.46)	40.5 (1.59)	6.8 (0.27)	22.8 (0.90)	9.1 (0.36)	0.0 (0.0)	11.6 (0.46)	4.1 (0.16)	20.2 (0.80)	29.8 (1.17)	10.5 (0.41)	89.7 (3.53)	307.6 (12.11)
Source: AGENSO (Jul 2024- Sep 2025)

== Industry ==
Aspropyrgos consists of a residential downtown area and an industrial area where a number of storage warehouses, metal recycling facilities, logistics handlers, wholesalers, small construction companies and other industrial businesses operate. The Aspropyrgos Refinery, south of the city and next to the sea, has been producing oil for many years. It is the largest in Greece (together with the Eleusis refinery), with an annual capacity of 135,000 bbl/d (21,500 m^{3}/d). As a consequence, pollution has been a problem for years. The refinery includes depots in the southern and eastern parts, and some in the western part and at a dock to the southwest.

== Population ==
Year	Population
1981	12,541
1991	15,715
2001	27,741
2011	30,251
2021	31,381

== Politics ==
Parliamentary election results since 2000
6/2023	5/2023	2019	9/2015	1/2015	6/2012
1. ND 32.00%; 2. KKE 19.61%; 3. Spartans 12.68%; 4. SYRIZA 11.86%; 5. EL 8.30%; 6. PASOK 4.78%; 7. Victory 2.47%; 8. PE 2.35%; 9. MERA25 1.21%; 10. Others 4.74%	1. ND 36.58%; 2. KKE 16.01%; 3. SYRIZA 14.54%; 4. EL 12.30%; 5. PASOK 5.19%; 6. PE 2.86%; 7. Victory 1.75%; 8. MERA25 1.41%; 9. SA 1.07%; 10. Others 8.29%	1. SYRIZA 37.58%; 2. ND 32.37%; 3. EL 7.22%; 4. KKE 6.18%; 5. XA 5.95%; 6. PASOK 3.29%; 7. MERA25 2.41%; 8. PE 1.32%; 9. ESY 1.15%; 10. Others 2.53%	1. SYRIZA 43.38%; 2. ND 18.97%; 3. XA 15.16%; 4. KKE 7.01%; 5. ANEL 3.27%; 6. LAE 2.58%; 7. PASOK 2.34%; 8. EK 2.29%; 9. River 1.63%; 10. Others 3.37%	1. SYRIZA 36.73%; 2. ND 21.39%; 3. XA 14.54%; 4. KKE 8.51%; 5. ANEL 6.06%; 6. River 2.84%; 7. Teleia 2.49%; 8. PASOK 2.10%; 9. LAOS 1.93%; 10. EK 1.04%; 11. KIDISO 1.00%; 12. Others 1.37%	1. SYRIZA 26.29%; 2. ND 19.16%; 3. ANEL 17.04%; 4. XA 16.75%; 5. KKE 6.60%; 6. PASOK 5.55%; 7. DIMAR 2.34%; 8. LAOS 2.29%; 9. Others 3.98%
5/2012	2009	2007	2004	2000	
1. ANEL 25.62%; 2. KKE 14.47%; 3. XA 13.08%; 4. SYRIZA 11.93%; 5. ND 11.40%; 6. PASOK 6.02%; 7. LAOS 4.28%; 8. DIMAR 2.39%; 9. OP 2.31%; 10. DISY 1.18%; 11. DIXA 1.09%; 12. KOISY 1.02%; 13. Others 5.21%	1. PASOK 50.67%; 2. ND 23.62%; 3. LAOS 9.53%; 4. KKE 9.03%; 5. SYRIZA 2.77%; 6. OP 1.85%; 7. Others 2.53%	1. PASOK 44.64%; 2. ND 32.78%; 3. KKE 9.90%; 4. LAOS 7.29%; 5. SYRIZA 2.57%; 6. Others 2.82%	1. PASOK 46.17%; 2. ND 37.00%; 3. KKE 7.61%; 4. LAOS 4.53%; 5. SYRIZA 1.66%; 6. DIKKI 1.44%; 7. Others 1.59%	1. PASOK 38.02%; 2. ND 36.18%; 3. DIKKI 12.15%; 4. KKE 7.19%; 5. Coalition 2.09%; 6. DPE 1.60%; 7. Others 2.77%	

European Parliament election results since 1999
2024	2019	2014	2009	2004	1999
1. ND 22.93%; 2. KKE 22.88%; 3. EL 16.37%; 4. SYRIZA 9.13%; 5. PASOK 6.19%; 6. FL 3.75%; 7. PE 2.75%; 8. Victory 2.31%; 9. Patriots 2.23%; 10. LAOS 2.13%; 11. MERA25 1.50%; 12. Others 7.83%	1. ND 21.64%; 2. SYRIZA 21.63%; 3. XA 11.66%; 4. KKE 7.89%; 5. EL 7.24%; 6. PASOK 3.05%; 7. MERA25 2.29%; 8. ANEL 1.99%; 9. PE 1.98%; 10. LAOS 1.97%; 11. ENYPEKK 1.62%; 12. EK 1.62%; 13. ESY 1.54%; 14. Citizens 1.49%; 15. River 1.25%; 16. M-L KKE 1.06%; 17. Others 10.08%	1. SYRIZA 23.39%; 2. XA 19.49%; 3. ND 15.57%; 4. KKE 9.99%; 5. ANEL 5.30%; 6. PASOK 4.50%; 7. LAOS 4.00%; 8. River 3.90%; 9. EPAL 3.85%; 10. Others 10.01%	1. PASOK 37.90%; 2. ND 25.80%; 3. KKE 11.97%; 4. LAOS 9.90%; 5. SYRIZA 3.23%; 6. OP 2.00%; 7. KEK 1.63%; 8. Others 7.57%	1. PASOK 32.94%; 2. ND 31.97%; 3. KKE 12.08%; 4. DPE 9.39%; 5. LAOS 5.46%; 6. Coalition 2.50%; 7. M-L KKE 1.12%; 8. Others 4.54%	1. PASOK 30.23%; 2. ND 29.53%; 3. KKE 15.22%; 4. DIKKI 7.20%; 5. Coalition 3.55%; 6. EK 1.99%; 7. POLAN 1.77%; 8. KEK 1.71%; 9. PG 1.05%; 10. M-L KKE 1.02%; 11. Others 6.73%

== Notable people ==
- Anastasios Karamanos
- Klavdia
- George Koskotas
- Evangelos Liakos
- Pavlos Mamalos
- Kyriakos Michas

== See also ==
- List of cities in Greece
