= List of extreme temperatures in Greece =

The following is a list of the most extreme temperatures ever recorded in Greece.

Greece has recorded a high temperature of 48.0 °C in Elefsina and Tatoi (both located in the Athens metropolitan area). In June 2007, Monemvasia in mainland Greece recorded a minimum temperature of 35.9 °C.

The lowest temperature ever recorded was -27.8 °C in Ptolemaida on the 27th of January 1963 (a sinkhole in Kechroti recorded -35.3 °C in January 2012).

According to the national press of the time, on the 10th of July 1977 the Hellenic National Meteorological Service station in Almyros recorded 49.0 °C, the second station in Tatoi (belonging to the National Observatory of Athens) recorded 48.7 °C and the stations in Volos, Velestino and Messara registered 48.0 °C (these readings have not been confirmed).

On the night between 25 and 26 of June 2007 the temperature did not drop below 38.0 °C in the Palaiochora National Observatory of Athens station. On the night of the 11th of January 2021 the National Observatory of Athens station in Falasarna recorded a temperature of 28.3 °C due to strong Föhn winds while the minimum temperature for that day was 22.6 °C marking both the highest January temperature during a night and the highest January minimum temperature ever recorded in Greece.

== Highest temperatures ==
Locations where temperature has reached or surpassed 46.0 °C (114.8 °F)

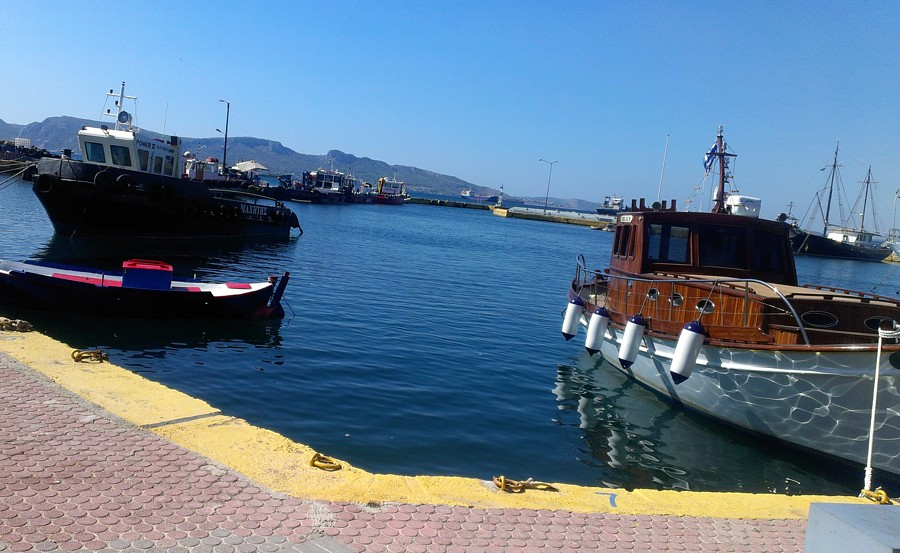
Elefsina holds the record for the highest temperature recorded in Greece and Continental Europe at 48.0 °C (118.4 °F)

Temperature	Location	Date Recorded
48.0 °C (118.4 °F)	Elefsina (Athens)	July 10, 1977
48.0 °C (118.4 °F)	Tatoi (Athens)	July 10, 1977
47.5 °C (117.5 °F)	Aspropyrgos (Athens)	June 26, 2007
47.5 °C (117.5 °F)	Nea Filadelfeia (Athens)	June 26, 2007
47.2 °C (117.0 °F)	Trikala (Thessaly)	August 23, 1958
47.1 °C (116.8 °F) (Note: The Lagkadas record has been removed for unknown reasons from the meteosearch database of the National Observatory of Athens .)	Lagkadas (Macedonia)	August 3, 2021
46.5 °C (115.7 °F)	Lamia (Central Greece)	July 19, 1973
46.4 °C (115.5 °F)	Argos (Peloponnese)	June 26, 2007
46.4 °C (115.5 °F)	Elefsina (Athens)	July 19, 1973
46.4 °C (115.5 °F)	Gytheio (Peloponnese)	July 23, 2023
46.3 °C (115.3 °F)	Argos (Peloponnese)	August 3, 2021
46.3 °C (115.3 °F)	Makrakomi (Central Greece)	August 2, 2021
46.2 °C (115.2 °F)	Avlonas (Attica)	July 26, 2023
46.2 °C (115.2 °F)	Nea Anchialos (Thessaly)	July 19, 1973
46.2 °C (115.2 °F)	Nea Filadelfeia (Athens)	June 26, 2007
46.2 °C (115.2 °F)	Makrakomi (Central Greece)	August 3, 2021
46.2 °C (115.2 °F)	Nea Filadelfeia (Athens)	July 25, 2007
46.2 °C (115.2 °F)	Palaiochora (Crete)	Unknown date
46.1 °C (115.0 °F)	Agia Triada, Phthiotis (Central Greece)	July 26, 2023
46.1 °C (115.0 °F)	Arfara (Peloponnese)	August 3, 2021
46.1 °C (115.0 °F)	Filothei (Athens)	August 3, 2021
46.0 °C (114.8 °F)	Tanagra (Central Greece)	July 19, 1973
46.0 °C (114.8 °F)	Argos (Peloponnese)	July 25, 2007
46.0 °C (114.8 °F)	Astros (Peloponnese)	June 26, 2007
46.0 °C (114.8 °F)	Sparta (Peloponnese)	August 24, 1924
45.9 °C (114.6 °F)	Magoula (Athens)	August 3, 2021
45.9 °C (114.6 °F)	Stylida (Central Greece)	August 3, 2021
45.9 °C (114.6 °F)	Moires (Crete)	July 1, 2017
45.9 °C (114.6 °F)	Ilion (Athens)	June 26, 2007
45.9 °C (114.6 °F)	Amfissa (Central Greece)	July 23, 2023
45.9 °C (114.6 °F)	Kranidi (Peloponnese)	July 23, 2023
45.8 °C (114.4 °F)	Kranidi (Peloponnese)	August 3, 2021
45.8 °C (114.4 °F)	Elefsina (Athens)	June 24, 2007
45.8 °C (114.4 °F)	Skala, Messenia (Peloponnese)	July 25, 2025

== Highest temperatures per month ==
Month
Month	Location	Temperature	Date Recorded
January	Vryses	30.4 °C (87 °F)	January 1, 2010
February	Vryses	32.1 °C (90 °F)	February 20, 2010
March	Fodele	34.9 °C (95 °F)	March 16, 2025
April	Heraklion	37.5 °C (100 °F)	April 22, 2008
May	Plora	41.8 °C (107 °F)	May 16, 2020
June	Nea Filadelfeia and Aspropyrgos	47.5 °C (117 °F)	June 26, 2007
July	Elefsina and Tatoi	48.0 °C (118 °F)	July 10, 1977
August	Trikala	47.2 °C (117 °F)	August 23, 1958
September	Larissa and Sivas	41.9 °C (107 °F)	September 5 and 7, 2015 respectively
October	Souda	40.0 °C (104 °F)	October 19, 1979
November	Fodele (Note: Also 35.1 °C (95 °F) in Sisi on the same day widely sourced as a record ,)	35.2 °C (95 °F)	November 4, 2023
December	Vryses and Heraklion	29.6 °C (85 °F)	December 1 and 2, 2010 respectively

== Highest minimum temperatures ==
Temperature	Location	Date Recorded
37.0 °C (98.6 °F)	Kythira	July 4, 1998
36.2 °C (97.2 °F)	Kythira	June 26, 2007
36.0 °C (96.8 °F)	Kythira	June 27, 2007
35.9 °C (96.6 °F)	Monemvasia	June 27, 2007
35.8 °C (96.4 °F)	Palaiochora	June 27, 2007
35.8 °C (96.4 °F)	Tympaki	August 4, 2021
35.2 °C (95.4 °F)	Plakias	August 3, 2021
35.2 °C (95.4 °F)	Palaiochora	August 4, 2021

== Lowest temperatures ==
Some locations where temperature fell at or under −21.0 °C (−5.8 °F)

Temperature	Location	Date Recorded
−27.8 °C (−18.0 °F)	Ptolemaida (Macedonia)	January 27, 1963
−25.1 °C (−13.2 °F)	Florina (Macedonia)	January 18, 2012
−25.1 °C (−13.2 °F)	Florina (Macedonia)	January 17, 2012
−25.1 °C (−13.2 °F)	Neos Kafkasos (Macedonia)	February 16, 2021
−25.0 °C (−13.0 °F)	Kavala (Macedonia)	January 27, 1954
−24.5 °C (−12.1 °F)	Florina (Macedonia)	January 16, 2012
−23.0 °C (−9.4 °F)	Florina (Macedonia)	February 4, 1929
−23.0 °C (−9.4 °F)	Florina (Macedonia)	January 8, 2019
−23.0 °C (−9.4 °F)	Serres (Macedonia)	January 27, 1963
−23.0 °C (−9.4 °F)	Kastoria (Macedonia)	December 19, 2001
−22.7 °C (−8.9 °F)	Florina (Macedonia)	January 16, 2012
−22.4 °C (−8.3 °F)	Kastoria (Macedonia)	January 6, 1993
−22.4 °C (−8.3 °F)	Neos Kafkasos (Macedonia)	January 6, 2019
−22.2 °C (−8.0 °F)	Florina (Macedonia)	January 16, 2012
−22.0 °C (−7.6 °F)	Florina (Macedonia)	January 6, 1993
−21.6 °C (−6.9 °F)	Larissa (Thessaly)	January 15, 1968
−21.4 °C (−6.5 °F)	Florina (Macedonia)	January 9, 1990
−21.4 °C (−6.5 °F)	Florina (Macedonia)	January 6, 2019
−21.3 °C (−6.3 °F)	Florina (Macedonia)	January 8, 2017
−21.1 °C (−6.0 °F)	Florina (Macedonia)	January 20, 1967
−21.0 °C (−5.8 °F)	Trikala (Thessaly)	December 19, 2001

== Lowest temperatures per month ==
Month
Month	Location	Temperature	Date Recorded
January	Ptolemaida (Macedonia)	−27.8 °C (−18.0 °F)	27 January 1963
February	Neos Kafkasos (Macedonia)	−25.1 °C (−13.2 °F)	16 February 2021
March	Kajmakčalan (Macedonia)	−19.1 °C (−2 °F)	11 March 2022
April	Kastoria (Macedonia)	−14.0 °C (7 °F)	8 April 2003
May	Kajmakčalan (Macedonia)	−4.6 °C (24 °F)	6 May 2011
June	Kajmakčalan (Macedonia)	−0.6 °C (31 °F)	1 June 2021
July	Kajmakčalan (Macedonia)	2.6 °C (37 °F)	8 July 2010
August	Kajmakčalan (Macedonia)	1.7 °C (35 °F)	23 August 2017
September	Kajmakčalan (Macedonia)	−4.5 °C (24 °F)	27 September 2018
October	Kajmakčalan (Macedonia)	−10.0 °C (14 °F)	16 October 2011
November	Seli (Macedonia)	−13.2 °C (8 °F)	30 November 2016
December	Kastoria (Macedonia)	−-23.0 °C (73 °F)	19 December 2001

== Sinkholes ==
=== Sinkholes lowest temperatures ===
Temperature	Location	Date Recorded
−35.3 °C (−31.5 °F)	Mainalo (Kechroti sinkhole)	17 January 2012
−33.1 °C (−27.6 °F)	Mount Parnassus (Sesi sinkhole)	17 January 2012
−32.9 °C (−27.2 °F)	Mainalo (Kechroti sinkhole)	8 January 2015
−32.8 °C (−27.0 °F)	Mainalo (Kechroti sinkhole)	9 January 2017
−32.5 °C (−26.5 °F)	Mainalo (Kechroti sinkhole)	26 January 2011
−31.6 °C (−24.9 °F)	Mount Parnassus (Sesi sinkhole)	15 February 2015

=== Sinkholes lowest temperatures per month ===
Month
Month	Location	Temperature	Date Recorded
January	Mainalo (Kechroti sinkhole)	−35.3 °C (−32 °F)	17 January 2012
February	Mount Parnassus (Sesi sinkhole)	−31.6 °C (−25 °F)	15 February 2015
March	Mount Parnassus (Vathistalos sinkhole)	−28.1 °C (−19 °F)	13 March 2022
April	Mount Parnassus (Sesi sinkhole)	−15.3 °C (4 °F)	7 April 2023
May	Mount Parnassus (Iraklis site)	−10.1 °C (14 °F)	9 May 2015
June	Mount Parnassus (Vathistalos sinkhole)	−5.8 °C (22 °F)	3 June 2021
July	Mainalo (Kechroti sinkhole)	−4.4 °C (24 °F)	4 July 2012
August	Mount Parnassus (Vathistalos sinkhole)	−3.8 °C (25 °F)	29 August 2025
September	Mount Parnassus (Vathistalos sinkhole)	−11.3 °C (12 °F)	25 September 2022
October	Mount Parnassus (Sesi sinkhole)	−18.3 °C (−1 °F)	20 October 2011
November	Mainalo (Kechroti sinkhole)	−17.9 °C (0 °F)	21 November 2011
December	Mount Parnassus (Vathistalos sinkhole)	−27.9 °C (−18 °F)	23 December 2021
