= Micha =

Micha is a unisex given name, nickname and surname which may refer to:

== Given name or nickname ==
- Micah (prophet), sometimes spelled Micha, a prophet in the biblical Book of Micah
- Micha Bar-Am (born 1930), German-born Israeli photographer
- Micha Josef Berdyczewski (1865–1921), Russian-born Jewish writer of Hebrew, journalist and scholar
- Micha Brumlik (1947–2025), Swiss-German professor of education
- Micha Cárdenas (born 1977), American visual and performance artist and academic
- Micha Djorkaeff (born 1974), French former footballer
- Micha Fehre (born 1997), German politician
- Michel Micha Gaillard (1957–2010), Haitian politician and university professor
- Micha Goldman (born 1948), Israeli former politician
- Micha Hancock (born 1992), American volleyball player
- Mikael Micha Kaufman (sport shooter) (born 1946), Israeli sport shooter
- Micha Kaufman, co-founder of Fiverr, an Israeli multinational online marketplace
- Micha Kirshner (1947–2017), Israeli photographer and photojournalist
- Micha Liberman (fl. 1997–present), American music editor and composer
- Micha Lindenstrauss (1937–2019), Israeli judge and State Comptroller of Israel between 2005 and 2012
- Micha Marah (born 1953), Belgian singer and actress
- Micha Østergaard (born 1987), Danish former swimmer
- Micha Peled (fl. 1993−present), Israeli film maker
- Micha Perles, Israeli mathematician
- Micha Powell (born 1995), Canadian sprinter
- Micha Ram (1942–2018), Israeli soldier and commander of the Israeli Navy
- Micha Shagrir (1937–2015), Israeli film director, producer, radio presenter and journalist
- Micha Sharir (born 1950), Israeli mathematician and computer scientist
- Micha Tomkiewicz (born 1939), Polish physicist, professor and writer
- Micha Ullman (born 1939), Israeli sculptor and professor of art
- Micha Wald (born 1974), Belgian film director and screenwriter
- Micha Wertheim (born 1972), Dutch comedian

== Surname ==
- Adela Micha (born 1963), Mexican journalist
- Dor Micha (born 1992), Israeli footballer
- Emiliano Esono Michá, imprisoned political activist in Equatorial Guinea
- José Fabio Micha (born 1994), footballer in and from Equatorial Guinea
- José Sacal Micha (1944–2018), Mexican sculptor and ceramist
- Juan Micha (born 1975), football manager and former player from Equatorial Guinea

== See also ==
- Sdot Micha Airbase, an Israeli Air Force missile base and depot, whose existence Israel neither confirms nor denies
- Mischa (disambiguation)
- Michas, a list of people with the given name or surname
- Michéa, a list of people with the surname Michéa or Michea
