= Jean-Loup Amselle =

French anthropologist

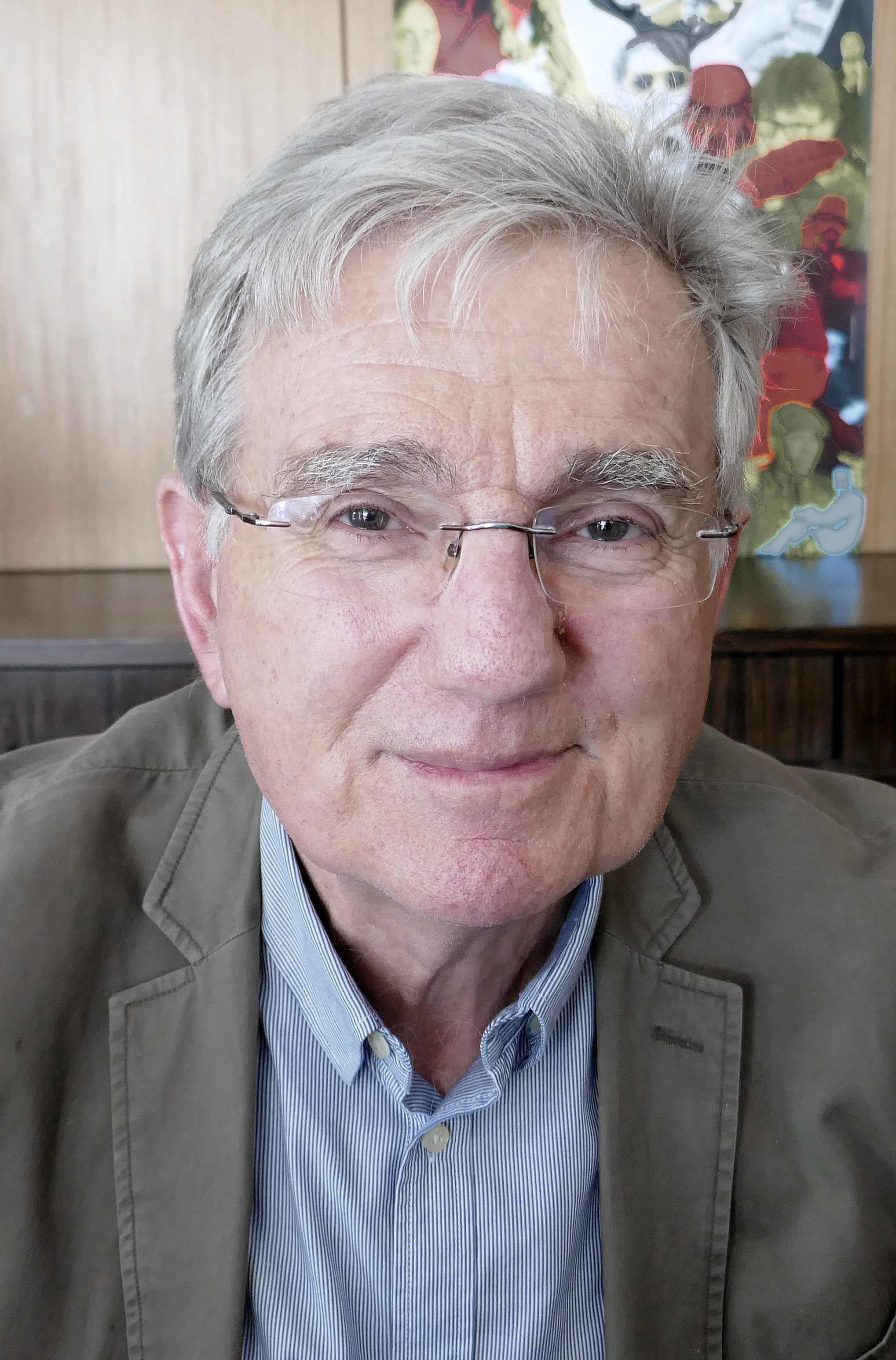
- Born: 1942 (age 83–84); Marseille (France)
- Occupation: Anthropologist

Jean-Loup Amselle is a French anthropologist and ethnologist. He is director of studies emeritus at EHESS and former editor-in-chief of the Cahiers d'études africaines.

== Biography ==
Trained in social anthropology and in ethnology, Jean-Loup Amselle had realized several works in the field in Mali, in Ivory Coast and in Guinea. He is the inventor of an 'anthropology of connections' (the way that a society feeds off different influences) and pursues research about themes like ethnicity, identity (Logiques métisses, 1990), interbreeding, but also about contemporary African art, and about multiculturalism (Vers un multiculturalisme français, 1996), postcolonialism (L'Occident décroché: enquête sur les postcolonialismes, 2008) and subordinatism. In 1998, he led, with Emmanuelle Sibeud, a work dealing with Maurice Delafosse, one of the pioneers of French Africanist ethnology.

In his 2011 work, L'Ethnicisation de la France (The Ethnicization of France), Amselle, described as a "Marxist anthropologist," criticizes the "postcolonial and multicultural left," which he holds responsible for the ethnicization of France. He challenges concepts like negritude by Aimé Césaire or creolization by Édouard Glissant.

In 2014, he published Les nouveaux rouges-bruns. Le racisme qui vient (The New Red-Browns: The Racism to Come), where he criticizes philosopher Jean-Claude Michéa. He also mentions other figures under this label, including Élisabeth Badinter, Jacques Julliard, Laurent Bouvet, Georges Bensoussan, Caroline Fourest, Natacha Polony, or Régis Debray.

Amselle suggests in 2015 that "the French state should facilitate the construction of mosques as well as finance Muslim education" to combat what he terms the "racialization of political discourse."

In 2016, regarding nationality revocation, he suggests considering "the elimination of the principle of nationality in the Constitution, regardless of the category of French citizens involved."

His 2019 essay À chacun son Marx ou les mésaventures de la dialectique (To Each Their Marx or the Dialectic's Misadventures) constitutes an "intellectual autobiography" where he continues his critique of intellectual "red-browning."

== Distinctions ==
- Knight of the Legion of Honour in 2015
- Carical Foundation Prize (Italy), Humanities section

== Selected works ==
- Amselle, Jean-Loup, and Elikia M'BOKOLO, eds. Au cœur de l'ethnie: ethnies, tribalisme et État en Afrique. La découverte, 2017.
- Amselle, Jean-Loup. "Logiques métisses: anthropologie de l'identité en Afrique et ailleurs." (1990).
- Amselle, Jean-Loup. L'Occident décroché. Stock, 2008.
- Amselle, Jean-Loup, and Emmanuelle Sibeud. "Maurice Delafosse." Entre orientalisme et ethnographie: l’itinéraire d’un africaniste (1870–1926)(Paris: Maisonneuve et Larose) (1998).
