= Michéa =

Michéa or Michea is a surname. Notable people with the surname include:

- Claude-François Michéa (1815–1882), French psychiatrist
- Francisco Michea (born 1978), Chilean football coach and former player
- Jean-Claude Michéa (born 1950), French philosopher

== See also ==
- Micha, a given name and surname
