= The Realm of Lesser Evil =

2007 book by Jean-Claude Michéa

- Author: Jean-Claude Michéa
- Original title: L'Empire du moindre mal
- Language: French
- Subject: liberalism
- Publisher: Flammarion
- Publication date: 10 September 2007
- Publication place: France
- English publication date: June 2009
- Pages: 209
- ISBN: 9782081207059

The Realm of Lesser Evil: An Essay on Liberal Civilization (French: L'Empire du moindre mal – essai sur la civilisation libérale) is a 2007 book by the French philosopher Jean-Claude Michéa.

== Summary ==
Jean-Claude Michéa outlines a history of liberalism, which he traces to the era of the European wars of religion in the 16th and 17th centuries. He analyzes liberalism as a single current with two facets: one that is cultural and political, and one that is economical. Michéa argues that the liberal project amounts to rejecting any standards for what a good life should consist of, and thereby rejecting moral standards. Statecraft under liberalism is therefore about trying to create the least bad society and a neutral state. As a consequence, it becomes difficult for the state to morally refuse demands from minorities, and limitations in general become hard to justify philosophically. Since moral values are restricted to civil society, they become entangled with monetary power, linking economic, political and cultural liberalism.

== Reception ==
Florence Delmotte wrote in La Revue nouvelle that Michéa does not attack liberalism as a system, but follows it as a logic. She wrote that his clear distinction between the defense of liberalism and actually existing liberalism (French: libéralisme réel) emphasises his questioning of the ideology's success, which may consist primarily of success at convincing people of its merits. Émilien Halard of Contrepoints wrote that Michéa comes off as modest as he mainly seeks to show how all facets of liberalism have roots in the reaction to the wars of religion. Halard was convinced by much in The Realm of Lesser Evil, but not by its thesis that the state's role in the economy diminishes with free-trade policies, as increased economic liberalism has concurred with increased tax burden and numbers of civil servants, and the French state actively promotes and subsidises cultural liberalism, rejecting neutrality as a part of its liberalism.

Polity published an English translation in 2009.

== Sequel ==
In 2008, Michéa published a sequel titled La double pensée – retour sur la question libérale (lit. 'Doublethink: Back to the Liberal Question'.
