= Strategos =

Greek military leader

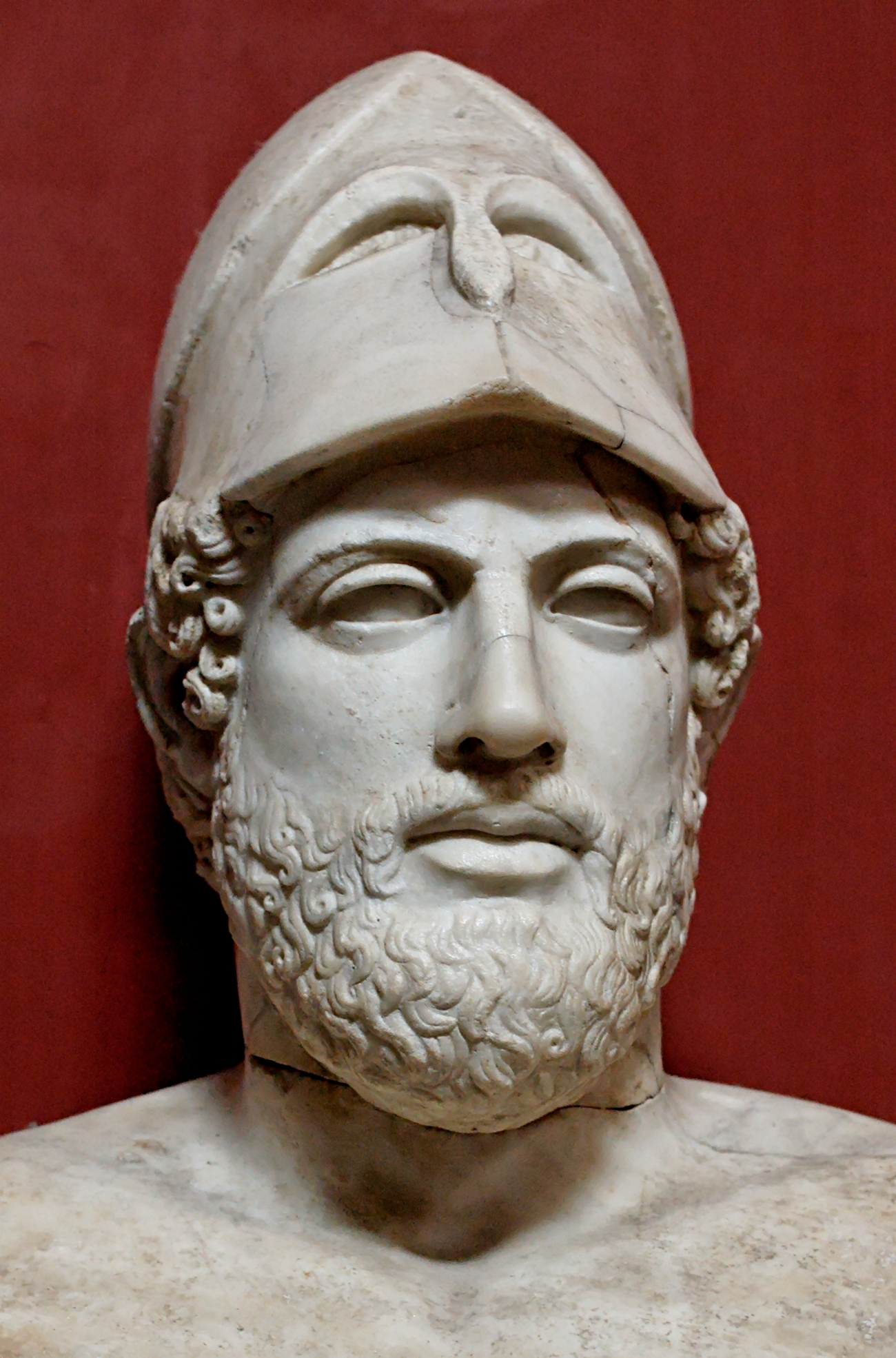
Bust of Pericles, statesman and general during the Golden Age of Athens; Hadrianic Roman copy of a Greek sculpture of c. 400 BC

Strategos (Note: Greek: στρατηγός [stɾatiˈɣos̠]; Doric Greek: στραταγός, stratagós; lit. 'army leader') (pl. strategoi), (Note: Greek: στρατηγοί [stɾatiˈʝi]) also known by its Latinised form strategus, is a Greek term meaning 'military general'. In the Hellenistic world and in the Byzantine Empire, the term also described a military governor. In the modern Hellenic Army, it is the highest officer rank.

== Etymology ==
Strategos is a compound of two Greek words: stratos and agos. Stratos (στρατός) means 'army', literally 'that which is spread out', coming from the proto-Indo-European root *stere-, 'to spread'. Agos (ἀγός) means 'leader', from agein (ἄγειν), 'to lead', from the pelasgic root *ag-, 'to drive, draw out or forth, move'.

== Classical Greece ==
=== Athens ===
In its most famous attestation, in Classical Athens, the office of strategos existed already in the 6th century BC, but it was only with the reforms of Cleisthenes in 501 BC that it assumed its most recognisable form: Cleisthenes instituted a board of ten strategoi who were elected annually, one from each tribe (phyle). The ten were of equal status, and replaced the polemarchos, who had hitherto been the senior military commander. At the Battle of Marathon in 490 BC (according to Herodotus) they decided strategy by majority vote, and each held the presidency in daily rotation. At this date the polemarchos had a casting vote, and one view among modern scholars is that he was the commander-in-chief; but from 486 onwards the polemarchos, like the other archontes, was appointed by lot. The annual election of the strategoi was held in the spring, and their term of office coincided with the ordinary Athenian year, from midsummer to midsummer. If a strategos died or was dismissed from office, a by-election might be held to replace him.

The strict adherence to the principle of a strategos from each tribe lasted until c. 440 BC, after which two strategoi could be selected from the same tribe and another tribe be left without its own strategos, perhaps because no suitable candidate might be available. This system continued at least until c. 356/7 BC, but by the time Aristotle wrote his Constitution of the Athenians in c. 330 BC, the appointments were made without any reference to tribal affiliation. Hence, during the Hellenistic period, although the number of the tribes was increased, the number of strategoi remained constant at ten.

In the early part of the 5th century, many strategoi combined their military office with a political role, with Themistocles, Aristides, Cimon, Pericles, Cleon among the most notable; nevertheless their power derived not from their office, but from their own personal political charisma. As political power passed to the civilian rhetores in the later 5th century, the strategoi were limited to their military duties. Originally, the strategoi were appointed ad hoc to various assignments. On campaign, several—usually up to three—strategoi might be placed jointly in command. Unlike other Greek states, where the nauarchos commanded the navy, the Athenian strategoi held command both at sea and on land. From the middle of the 4th century, the strategoi increasingly were given specific assignments, such as the strategos epi ten choran (στρατηγὸς ἐπὶ τὴν χώραν) for the defence of Attica; the strategos epi tous hoplitas (στρατηγὸς ἐπὶ τοὺς ὁπλίτας), in charge of expeditions abroad; the two strategoi epi ton Peiraia (στρατηγοὶ ἐπὶ τὸν Πειραιᾶ), responsible for the war harbour of Piraeus; and the strategos epi tas symmorias (στρατηγὸς ἐπὶ τὰς συμμορίας), responsible for the equipment of the warships. This was generalised in Hellenistic times, when each strategos was given specific duties. In the Roman Imperial period, the strategos epi ta hopla (στρατηγὸς ἐπὶ τὰ ὅπλα) became the most prominent magistrate in Athens. The other generals had disappeared by the end of the first century BC.

The Athenian people kept a close eye on their strategoi. Like other magistrates, at the end of their term of office they were subject to euthyna and in addition there was a vote in the ekklesia during every prytany on the question whether they were performing their duties well. If the vote went against anyone, he was deposed and as a rule tried by jury. Pericles himself in 430 was removed from office as strategos and fined, and in 406 six of the eight strategoi who commanded the fleet at the Battle of Arginusae were all removed from office and condemned to death.

=== Hellenic League ===
The title of strategos autokrator was also used for generals with broad powers, but the extent and nature of these powers was granted on an ad hoc basis. Thus Philip II of Macedon was elected as strategos autokrator (commander-in-chief with full powers) of the Hellenic League. His son Alexander the Great succeeded him both as king of Macedon and as strategos autokrator of Greece.

=== Other Greek states ===
The title of strategos appears for a number of other Greek states in the Classical period, but it is often unclear whether this refers to an actual office, or is used as a generic term for military commander. The strategos as an office is attested at least for Syracuse from the late 5th century BC, Erythrae, and in the koinon of the Arcadians in the 360s BC.

== Hellenistic and Roman use ==
Under Philip II of Macedon, the title of strategos was used for commanders on detached assignments as the quasi-representatives of the king, often with a title indicating their area of responsibility, e.g. strategos tes Europes ('general of Europe').

In several Greek city leagues the title strategos was reserved for the head of state. In the Aetolian League and the Achaean League, where the strategos was annually elected, he was the eponymous chief of civil government and the supreme military commander at the same time. Two of the most prominent leaders re-elected many times to the office in the Achaean League, were Aratus of Sicyon and Philopoemen of Megalopolis. Strategoi are also reported in the Arcadian League, in the Epirote League and in the Acarnanian League, whereas the leaders of the Boeotian League and the Thessalian League had different titles, Boeotarch and Tagus respectively.

In the Hellenistic empires of the Diadochi, notably Lagid Egypt, for which most details are known, strategos became a gubernatorial office combining civil with military duties. In Egypt, the strategoi were originally responsible for the Greek military colonists (klerouchoi) established in the country. Quickly, they assumed a role in the administration alongside the nomarches, the governor of each of the country's nomes, and the oikonomos, in charge of fiscal affairs. Already by the time of Ptolemy II Philadelphus (r. 283–246 BC), the strategos was the head of the provincial administration, while conversely his military role declined, as the klerouchoi were progressively demilitarised. Ptolemy V Epiphanes (r. 204–181 BC) established the office of epistrategos (ἐπιστράτηγος, lit. 'over-general') to oversee the individual strategoi. The latter had become solely civilian officials, combining the role of the nomarches and the oikonomos, while the epistrategos retained powers of military command. In addition, hypostrategoi (sing.: hypostrategos, ὐποστράτηγος, 'under-general') could be appointed as subordinates. The Ptolemaic administrative system survived into the Roman period, where the epistrategos was subdivided in three to four smaller offices, and the procurator ad epistrategiam was placed in charge of the strategoi. The office largely retained its Ptolemaic functions and continued to be staffed by the Greek population of the country.

The Odrysian kingdom of Thrace was also divided into strategiai ('generalships'), each headed by a strategos, based on the various Thracian tribes and subtribes. At the time of the kingdom's annexation into the Roman Empire in 46 AD, there were 50 such districts, which were initially retained in the new Roman province, and only gradually fell out of use. It was not until c. 136 that the last of them were abolished.

Under the Roman Republic and later through the Principate, Greek historians often used the term strategos when referring to the Roman political/military office of praetor. Such a use can be found in the New Testament: Acts of the Apostles 16:20 refers to the magistrates of Philippi as strategoi. Correspondingly, antistrategos (ἀντιστράτηγος, 'vice-general') was used to refer to the office of propraetor.

=== Byzantine use ===
The term continued in use in the Greek-speaking Byzantine Empire. Initially, the term was used along with stratelates and, less often, stratopedarches, to render the supreme military office of magister militum (the general in command of a field army), but could also be employed for the regional duces. In the 7th century, with the creation of the Theme system, their role changed: as the field armies were resettled and became the basis for the territorial themes, their generals too assumed new responsibilities, combining their military duties with the civil governance of the theme. The first themes were few and very large, and in the 8th century, the provincial strategoi were in constant antagonism with the emperor at Constantinople, rising often in rebellion against him. In response, the themes were progressively split up and the number of strategoi increased, diluting their power. This process was furthered by the conquests of the 10th century, which saw the establishment of several new and smaller frontier themes: while in c. 842 the Taktikon Uspensky lists 18 strategoi, the Escorial Taktikon, written c. 971–975, lists almost 90.

Throughout the middle Byzantine period (7th–12th centuries), the strategos of the Anatolic theme enjoyed precedence over the others and constituted one of the highest offices of the state, and one of the few from which eunuchs were specifically barred. At the same time, the Eastern (Anatolian) themes were senior to the Western (European) ones. This distinction was especially marked in the pay of their presiding strategoi: while those of the Eastern themes received their salary directly from the state treasury, their counterparts in the West had to raise their—markedly lower—pay from the proceeds of their provinces. During the 11th century, the strategoi were gradually confined to their military duties, their fiscal and administrative responsibilities being taken over by the civil kritai ('judges'). Senior military leadership also devolved on the hands of a new class of officers titled doukes or katepano, who were placed in control of regional commands combining several themes. By the 13th century, the term strategos had reverted to the generic sense of "general", devoid of any specific technical meaning.

The Byzantines also used a number of variations of the title strategos: strategetes (στρατηγέτης, 'army leader') was an infrequently used alternative term; the term monostrategos (μονοστράτηγος, 'single-general') designated a general placed in command over other strategoi or over the forces of more than one theme; the terms strategos autokrator, archistrategos (ἀρχιστράτηγος, 'chief-general') and protostrategos (πρωτοστράτηγος, 'first-general') designated commanders vested with supreme authority; and the term hypostrategos (ὐποστράτηγος, 'under-general') denoted a second-in-command, effectively a lieutenant general.

== Kingdom of Sicily ==
Strategus or stratigotus was the title of certain local officials in the Kingdom of Sicily and its predecessor, the Duchy of Apulia. They were governors with command of the local militia and perhaps originally also local justiciars. Appointed by the king, they answered to the royal dīwān. Duke Roger Borsa refers to his stratigoti in a charter of 1092. Before his rise to prominence in the 1130s, George of Antioch served as stratigotus in Iato. In 1167, the chancellor Stephen of Perche had the stratigotus of Messina removed for oppressive behaviour. The office is also attested in the Val Demone and in Syracuse.

== Modern use ==
In the modern Hellenic Army, a stratigós (the spelling remains στρατηγός) is the highest officer rank. The superior rank of stratárchis (Field Marshal) existed under the monarchy, but has not been retained by the current Third Hellenic Republic. Under the monarchy, the rank of full stratigós in active service was reserved for the King and a few other members of the royal family, with very few retired career officers promoted to the rank as an honorary rank. Since c. 1970, in accordance with NATO practice for the member nations' chiefs of defence, the rank is held in active service by the Chief of the General Staff of National Defence, when he is an Army officer, and is granted to the retiring Chief of the Hellenic Army General Staff.

All but one of the other Greek general officer ranks are derivations of this word: antistrátigos (Antistrategos) and ypostrátigos (Hypostrategos), for Lieutenant General and Major General, respectively. A Brigadier General however is called taxíarchos, after a táxis (in modern usage taxiarchía), which means brigade. The ranks of antistrátigos and ypostrátigos are also used by the Hellenic Police (and the Greek Gendarmerie before), the Greek Fire Service and the Cypriot National Guard, which lack the grade of full stratigós.

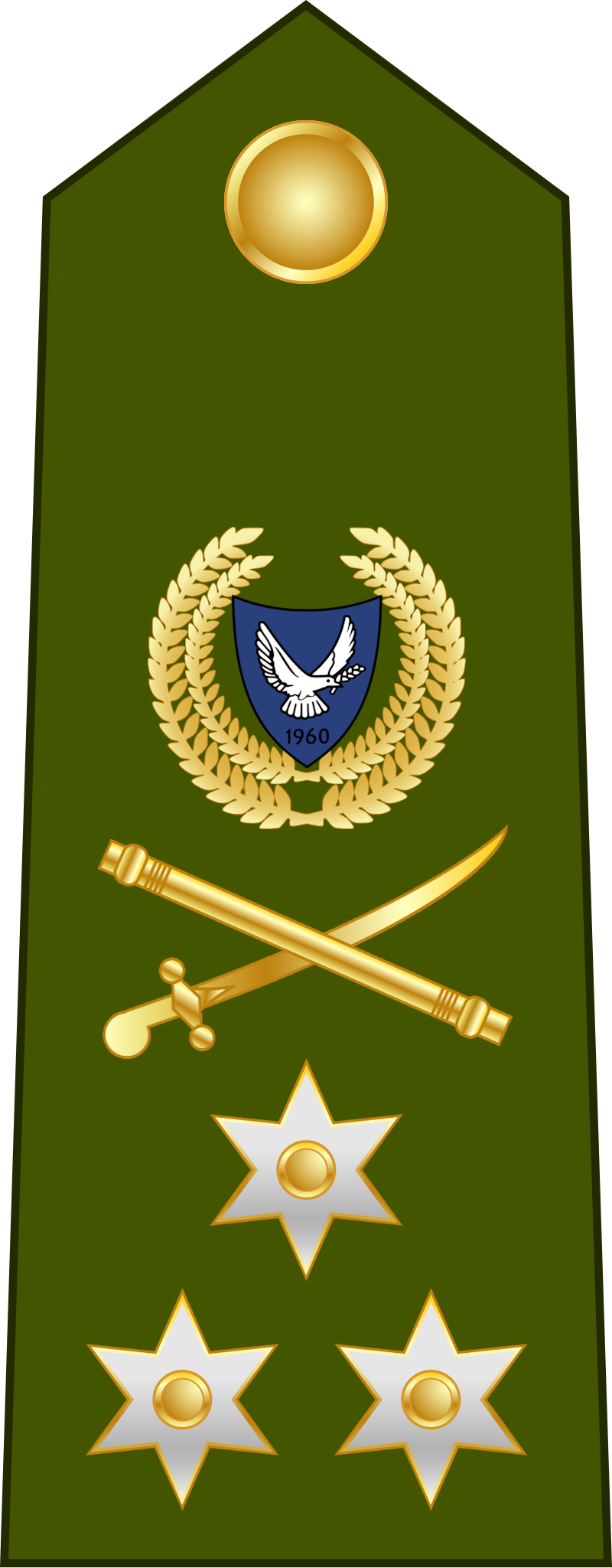
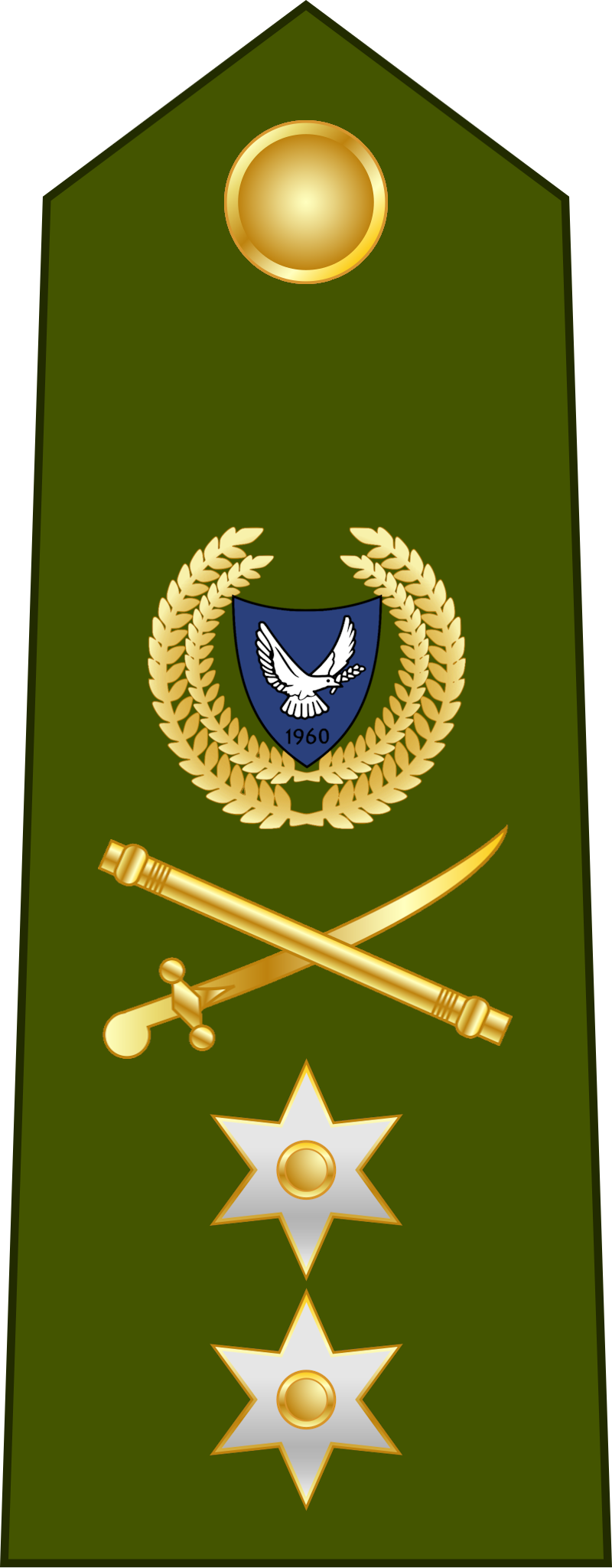
Cypriot Ground Forces (1964–today)
Αντιστράτηγος; Antistrátigos	Υποστράτηγος; Ypostrátigos
Hellenic Army (1975–today)
Στρατηγός; Stratigos	Αντιστράτηγος; Antistratigos	Υποστράτηγος; Ypostratigos
Hellenic Army (1909–1937)
Στρατηγός; Stratigos	Αντιστράτηγος; Antistratigos	Υποστράτηγος; Ypostratigos
Hellenic Police (1984–today)
Αντιστράτηγος; Antistratigos	Υποστράτηγος; Ypostratigos
Hellenic Fire Service
Αντιστράτηγος; Antistratigos	Υποστράτηγος; Ypostratigos

Flag of Greece Greek commissioned officer ranks
NATO code:	OF-1	OF-2	OF-3	OF-4	OF-5	OF-6	OF-7	OF-8	OF-9
Navy:	Simaioforos & Anthypoploiarchos	Ypoploiarchos	Plotarchis	Antiploiarchos	Ploiarchos	Archiploiarchos	Yponavarchos	Antinavarchos	Navarchos
Army:	Anthypolochagos & Ypolochagos; Ypilarchos & Anthypilarchos (Armoured)	Lochagos; Ilarchos (Armoured)	Tagmatarchis	Antisyntagmatarchis	Syntagmatarchis	Taxiarchos	Ypostratigos	Antistratigos	Stratigos
Air Force:	Anthyposminagos & Yposminagos	Sminagos	Episminagos	Antisminarchos	Sminarchos	Taxiarchos Aeroporias	Ypopterarchos	Antipterarchos	Pterarchos

== General sources ==
- Hamel, Debra (1998). Athenian Generals: Military Authority in the Classical Period. Leiden.
- Hansen, M. H. (1987). The Athenian Democracy in the Age of Demosthenes. Oxford.
- Krsmanović, Bojana (2008). The Byzantine Province in Change: On the Threshold Between the 10th and the 11th Century. Belgrade: Institute for Byzantine Studies. ISBN 9789603710608.
- Oxford Classical Dictionary, 2nd edition. (1996). "strategoi".
- Roberts, John (2005). Dictionary of the Classical World. Oxford.
