= Evangelos Liakos =

Greek politician (born 1989)

- Βαγγέλης Λιάκος
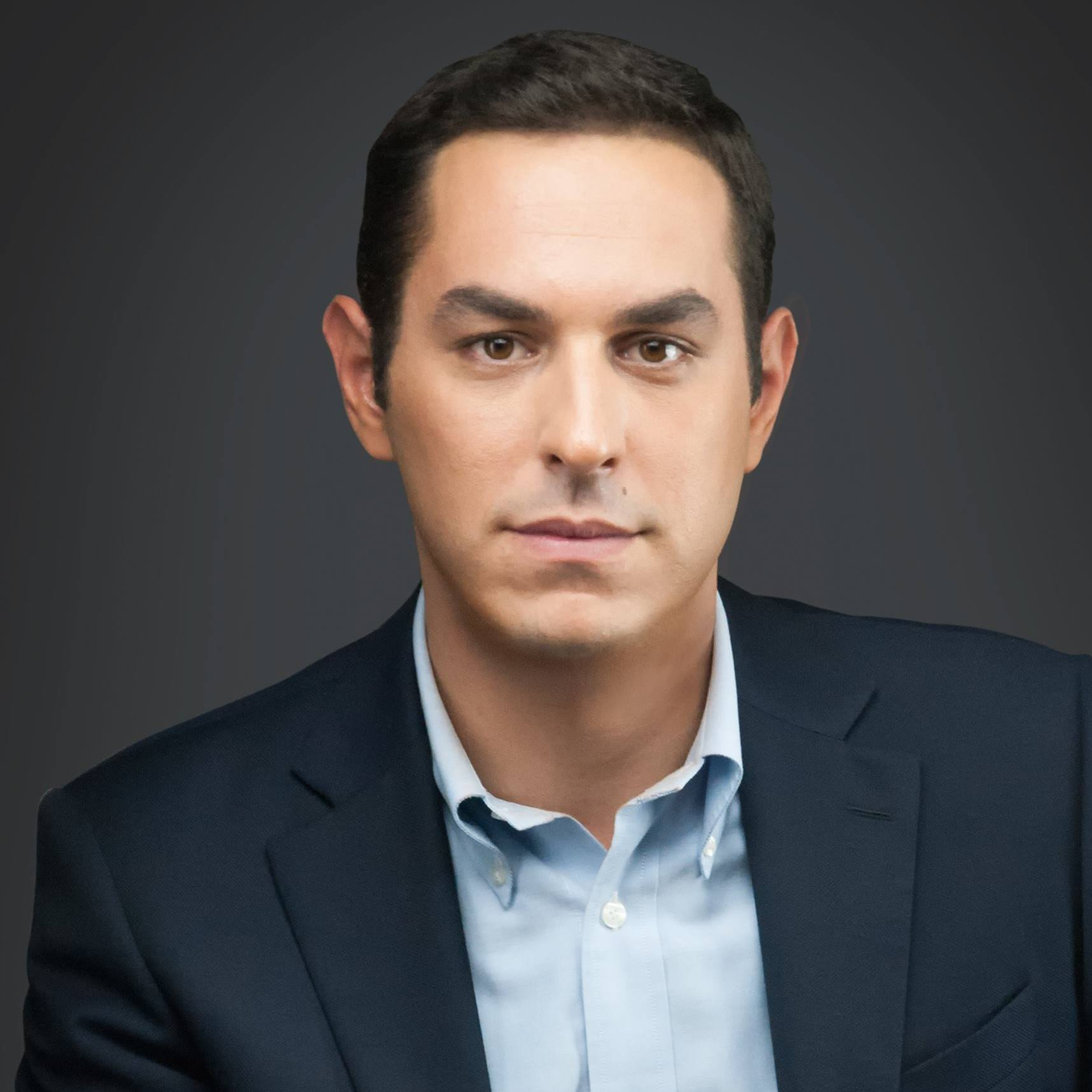
- Born: February 11, 1989 (age 36); Athens, Greece
- Education: National Technical University of Athens; Athens University of Economics and Business

Evangelos Liakos (born February 11, 1989) is a Greek mechanical engineer, politician, and Member of Parliament for New Democracy.

== Biography ==
He was born on February 11, 1989, in Athens and grew up and resides in Aspropyrgos, Attica. He studied at the National Technical University of Athens, where he obtained his degree in Mechanical Engineering with a specialization in Production Organization and Business Administration. He holds a postgraduate degree from the Athens University of Economics and Business in Applied Economics and Finance. He has worked in the private sector as a business consultant, and he maintains his own Technical Office in Aspropyrgos.

== Political career ==
During his student years, he was actively involved with DAP-NDFK. In 2016, he founded the Political Academy of ONNED, where he also served as director. In 2015, he participated in the national elections as a New Democracy candidate for the Attica Region. At the age of 29, he was elected Member of Parliament for West Attica with New Democracy in the 2019 elections, being the youngest member of this composition of the Greek Parliament. On July 18, 2019, he was elected Secretary of the Parliament.
