= Stephen G. Miller =

American archaeologist

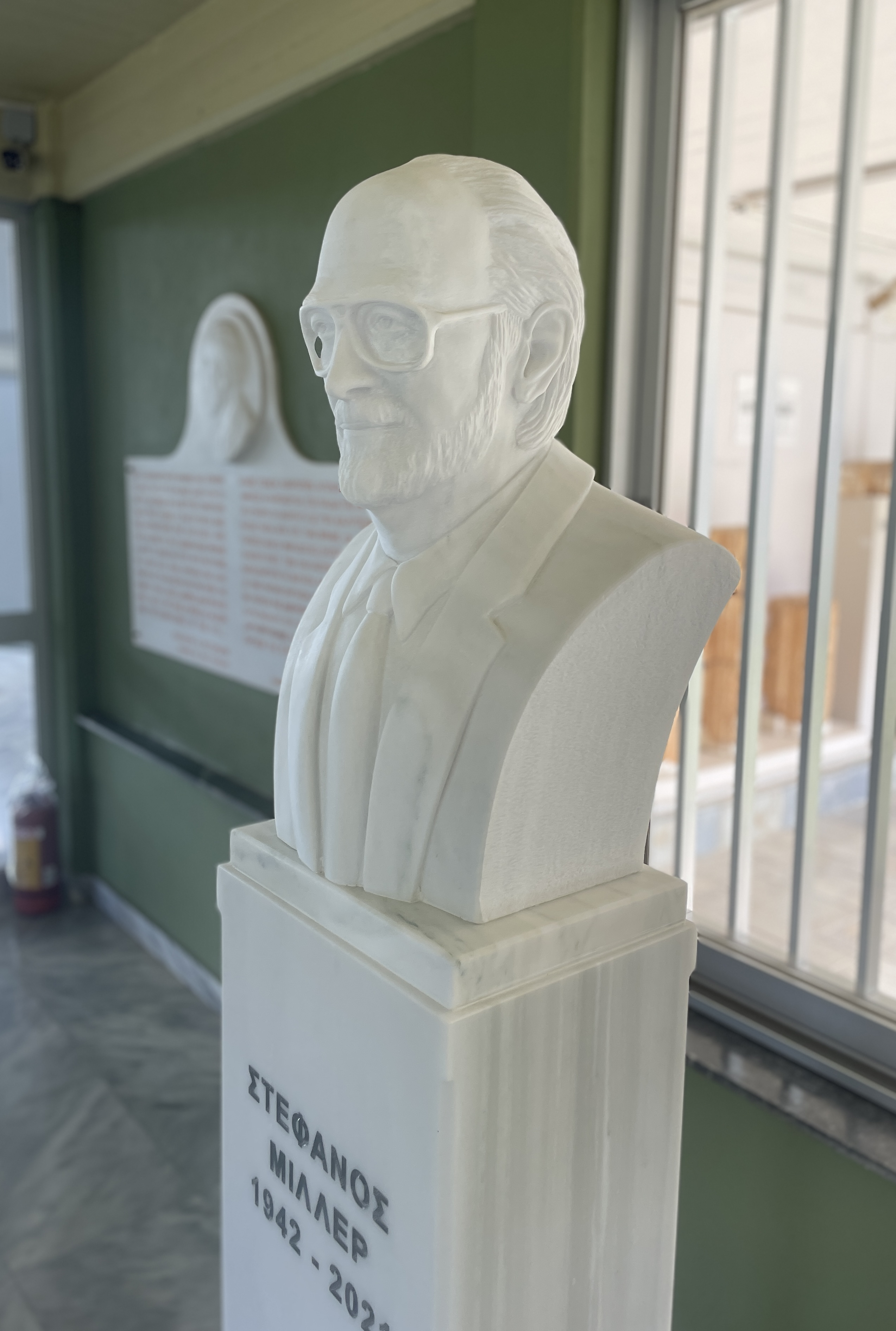
- Bust of Miller at the Archaeological Museum of Nemea
- Born: June 22, 1942; Goshen, US
- Died: August 11, 2021 (aged 78–79); Athens, Greece
- Known for: Excavation of Nemea
- Scientific career
- Fields: Archaeology

Stephen Gaylord Miller (June 22, 1942 – August 11, 2021) was an American historian and archaeologist who devoted over three decades of his career to the excavation and promotion of the archaeological site of Ancient Nemea in the Peloponnese, Greece.

== Early life ==
Miller was born in Goshen, Indiana to a Methodist family. In 1960 he enrolled in Wabash College with the intent to study law. However, upon attending two lectures by the visiting Greek scholar George Mylonas, he changed his mind and decided to become an archaeologist.

== Career ==
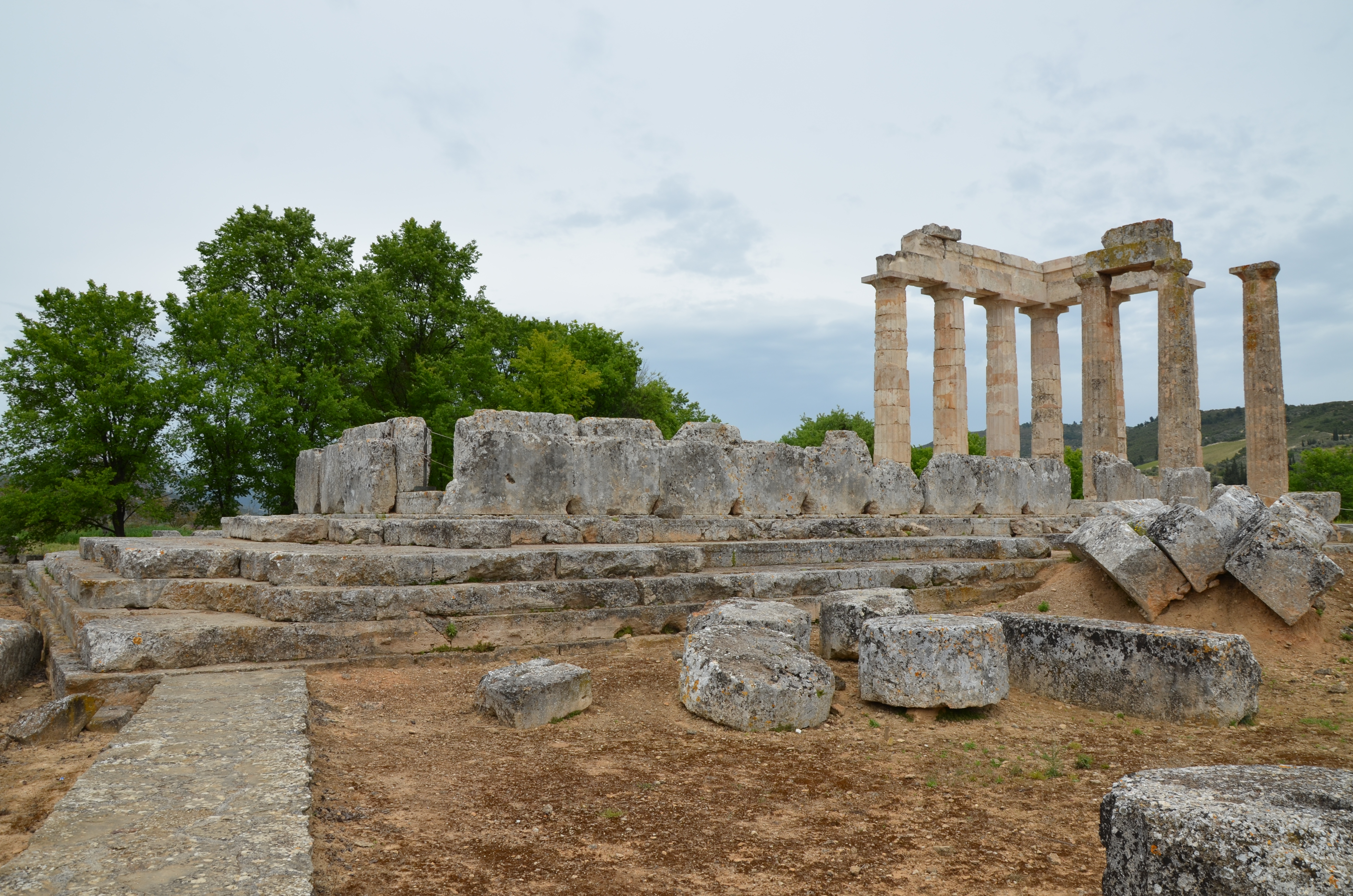
Temple of Zeus, Nemea

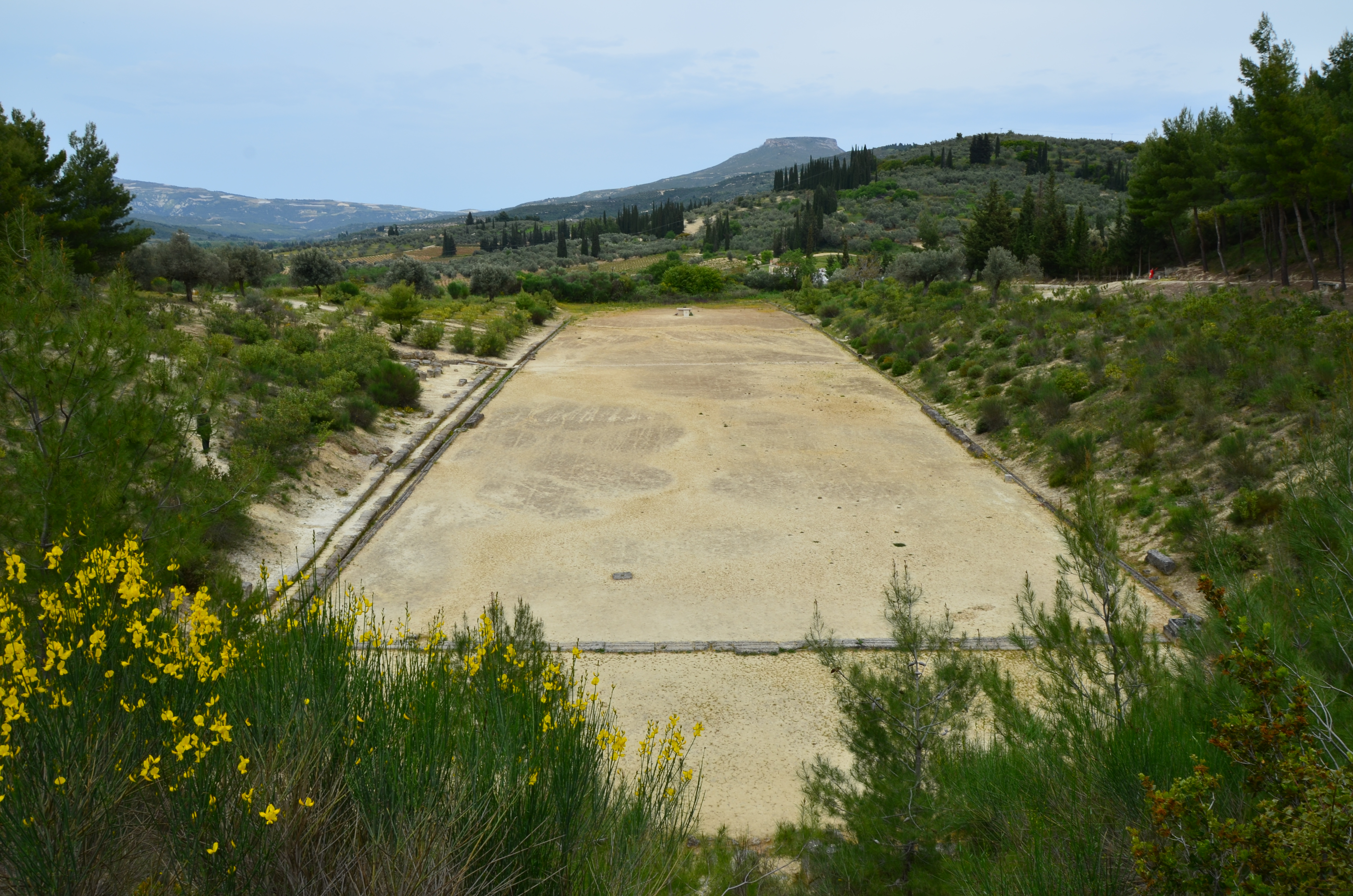
Ancient Stadium, Nemea

Stephen Miller obtained a bachelor's degree in Ancient Greek from Wabash College in 1964. He then pursued graduate studies, earning a master's degree and a PhD in Classical Archaeology from Princeton University in 1967 and 1970. Miller participated in excavations in Morgantina, Olympia, Athenian Agora and Amphipolis. In 1971, he was elected Assistant Professor at the Department of Classics, University of California, Berkeley and appointed director of excavations at Nemea. There, he and his team unearthed the Sanctuary of Zeus and the ancient stadium, constructed around 330 BC. This stadium hosted the Nemean Games, athletic competitions like those at Olympia, Delphi, and Isthmia. The games at the four sites constituted the Panhellenic Games and their victors were the most famous athletes of classical antiquity.

In parallel with his field work in Nemea, Miller continued to teach at Berkeley, being promoted to Associate Professor in 1975 and full Professor in 1981. During 1982–87, he served as the Director of the American School of Classical Studies at Athens.

Miller amassed donations for the construction of the Nemea museum, created an archaeological park, oversaw the restoration of the Temple of Zeus, founded the Society for the Revival of the Nemean Games and promoted Nemea and its heritage as a tourist destination. He published extensively on his archaeological discoveries, including "Nemea II: The Early Hellenistic Stadium” (University of California Press 2001).

In 2005, Miller was bestowed the Greek title of Grand Commander (Greek: Ταξιάρχης) of the Order of Honor and was made an honorary Greek citizen by decree of the President of the Hellenic Republic under the name Stephanos G. Miller (Greek: Στέφανος Γ. Μίλλερ_. He was also awarded honorary doctorates by the University of Athens (1996) and Wabash College (2012).

== Personal life ==
Stephen Miller was married to Greek-American Effie Davlantes. After his retirement from Berkeley in 2004, he settled permanently in Nemea.

== See also ==
- Nemea
- Archaeological Museum of Nemea
