= Democratic Regional Union =

Democratic Regional Union Δημοκρατική Περιφερειακή Ένωση
- Leader: Mihalis Haralambidis
- Founded: March 13, 2000
- Dissolved: 2006
- Split from: Panhellenic Socialist Movement
- Ideology: Regionalism; Green politics Socialism; Green municipalism
- Political position: Centre-left

The Democratic Regional Union (Greek: Δημοκρατική Περιφερειακή Ένωση, Dimokratiki Periferiaki Enosi) was a Greek political party. It is led by Mihalis Haralambidis.

The party was founded in March 2000 as a split from the Panhellenic Socialist Movement.

== Electoral results ==
Results since 2000 (year links to election page)
Year	Type of Election	Votes	%	Mandates
2000	Parliament	32,068	0.47	0
2004	European	44,541	0.73	0
