= Debra Hamel =

American historian

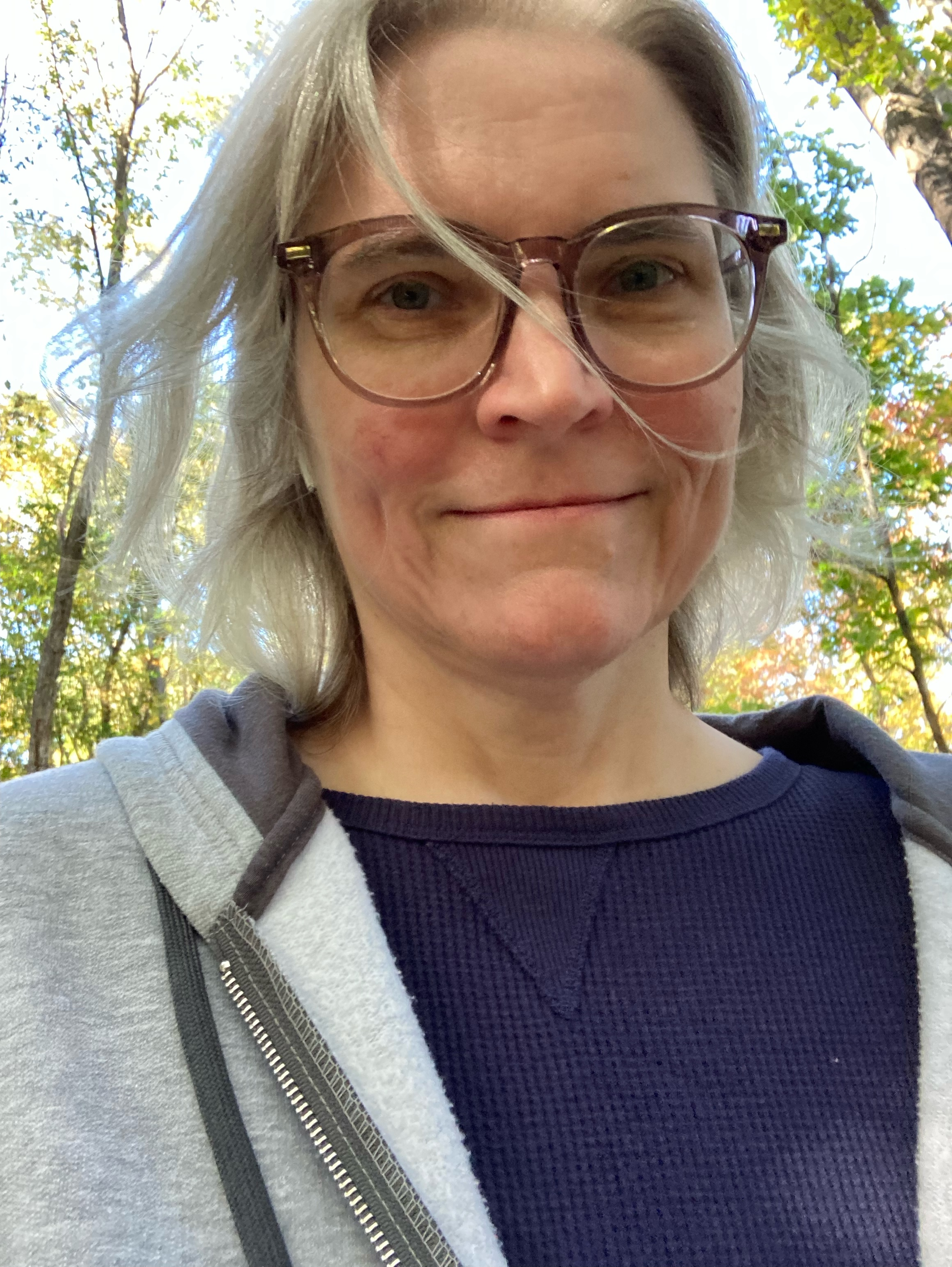

Debra Hamel is an American historian specializing in ancient Greece.

== Life and career ==
Hamel was born in 1964 in New Haven, Connecticut. She graduated from Johns Hopkins University in 1989 with a Bachelor of Arts degree in classics with departmental and general honors. Hamel studied at Yale University and graduated with an M.A. and M.Phil. in classical languages and literatures in 1993. She received her Ph.D. in 1996, with the dissertation Athenian Strategoi: The Extent and Exercise of Authority in the Military Sphere, 501/0-322/1 three years later. From 1998 to 2001 Hamel was Visiting Assistant Professor at Wesleyan University.

Debra Hamel's main topics are ancient Greek law and Greek military history. She has written several articles for the journal Military History Quarterly.

Hamel lives with her husband and her two daughters in North Haven.

== Works ==
- Athenian Generals. Military Authority in the Classical Period., Brill, Leiden a.o. 1998 (Mnemosyne Supplementum 182) ISBN 90-04-10900-5
- Trying Neaira. The True Story of a Courtesan's Scandalous Life in Ancient Greece. Yale University Press, New Haven and London 2003. ISBN 0-300-10763-3
- Reading Herodotus: A Guided Tour through the Wild Boars, Dancing Suitors and Crazy Tyrants of The History. Johns Hopkins University Press, Baltimore 2012 ISBN 978-1-4214-0655-8
- The Battle of Arginusae: Victory at Sea and Its Tragic Aftermath in the Final Years of the Peloponnesian War. Johns Hopkins University Press, Baltimore 2015 ISBN 978-1-4214-1681-6
- The Mutilation of the Herms Amazon Digital Services. 2012 ISBN 1-4750-5193-X
- Killing Eratosthenes: A True Crime Story From Ancient Athens. Amazon Digital Services. 2016 ISBN 978-1523995691
