= Kyriakos Michas =

Greek football manager

Personal information
- Date of birth: 15 June 1966 (age 60)
- Place of birth: Aspropyrgos, Greece

Managerial career
- Years: Team
- 2009: Aspropyrgos
- 2010: Aspropyrgos
- 2013: Mandraikos
- 2013–2014: Glyfada
- 2014: Vyzas
- 2015: Vyzas
- 2015–2016: Atromitos Piraeus
- 2018: Aspropyrgos
- 2015–2016: Proodeftiki

Kyriakos Michas (Greek: Κυριάκος Μίχας; born 15 June 1966) is a Greek football manager.
