= Archaeological Museum of Nemea =

Coordinates: 37.80767°N 22.71112°E

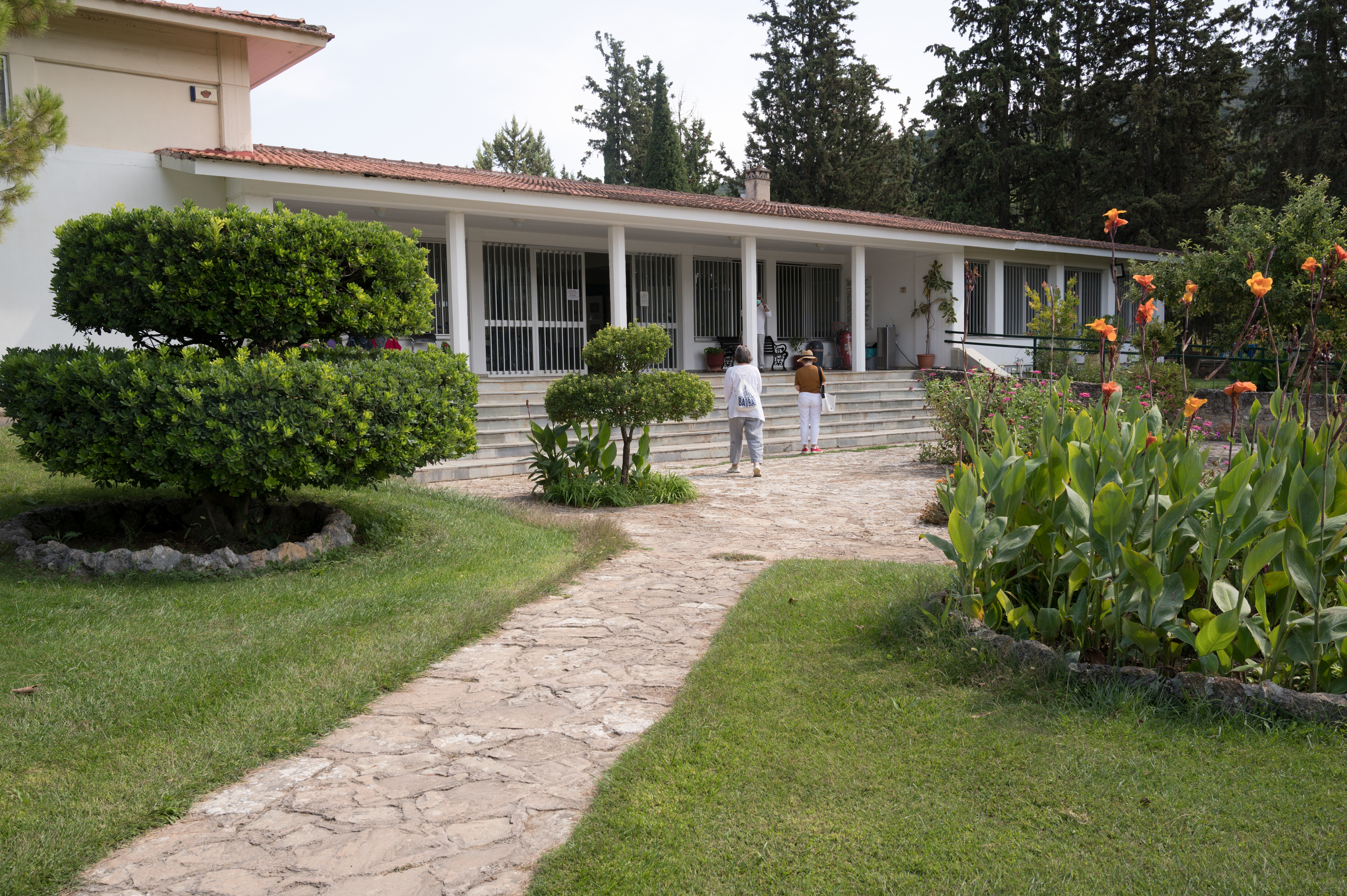
- Established: 1984
- Type: Archaeological Museum
- Website: http://odysseus.culture.gr/h/1/eh151.jsp?obj_id=3399

The Archaeological Museum of Nemea is a museum in Nemea, Corinthia, Greece. It was constructed by the University of California and given to the Greek State in 1984. The museum is located at the entrance to the Archaeological site of Nemea. Exhibits finds from this site and the surrounding areas, from Cooper Age (Chalcolithic) to early Byzantine era.

== Collections ==
The museum contains a collection of pictures of Nemea by travellers of the 18th and 20th centuries, coins of ancient visitors to Nemea, items related to the athletic activity on the site, prehistoric finds (pottery, tools, weapons etc.) from sites in the district of Nemea, pottery and jewellery from the Mycenaean cemetery at Aidonia and the settlement of Aghia Eirene, architectural parts from monuments at Nemea and other sites, and a collection of inscriptions from Nemea, Phlius and Petri.

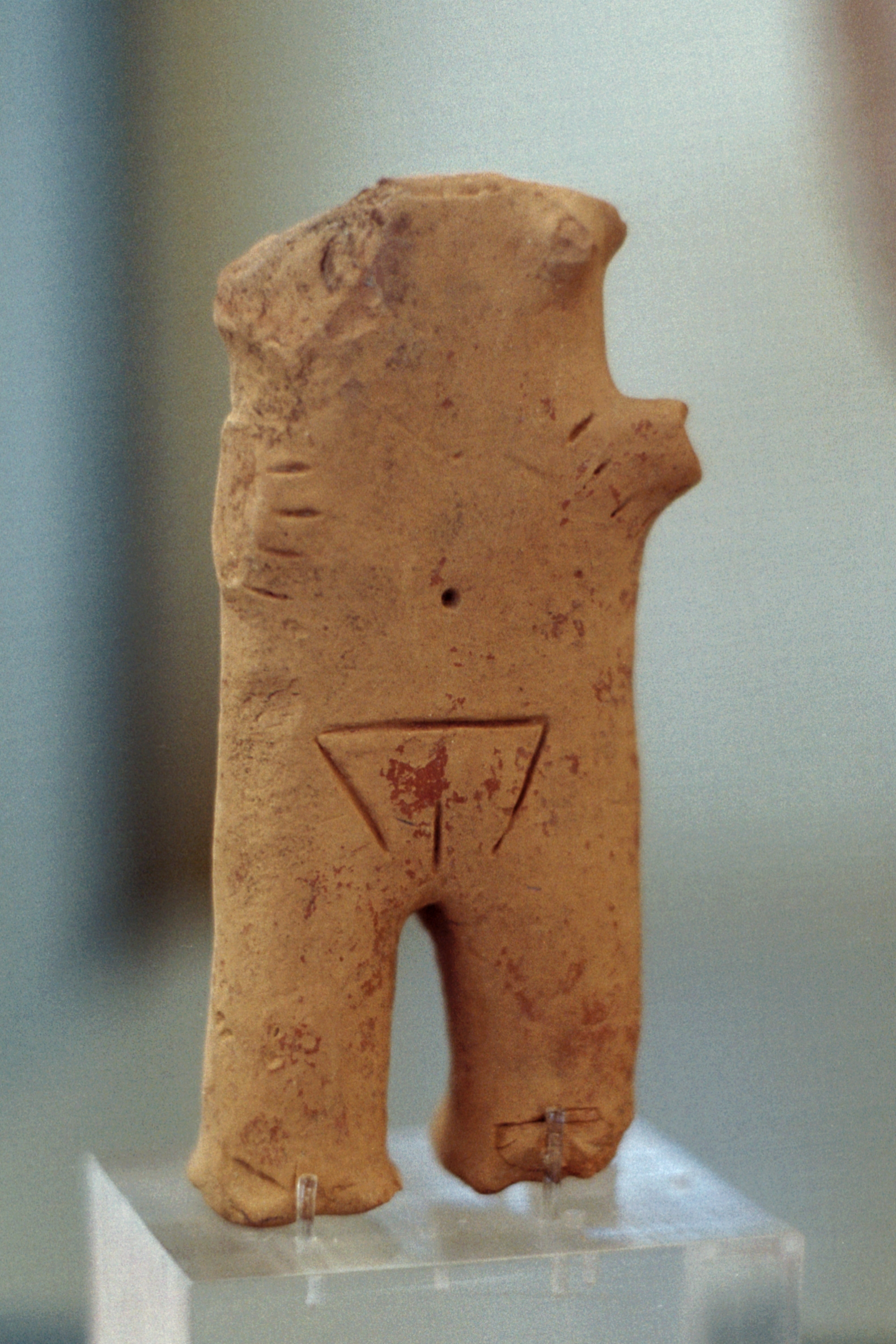
Fragment of a female figurine, Phlius (Flious), 4500-3200 BC

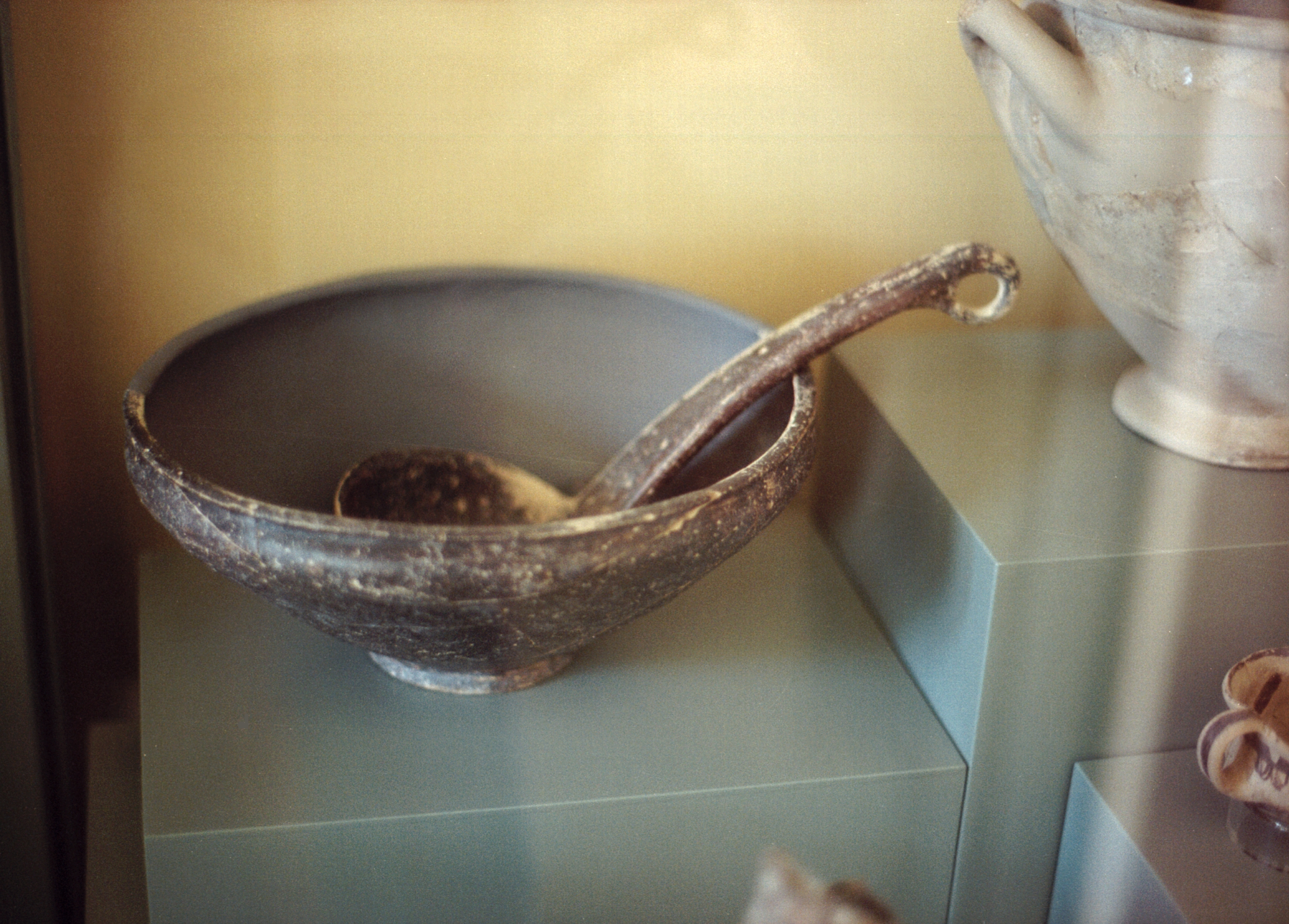
Early Helladic pottery, 2700-2200 BC

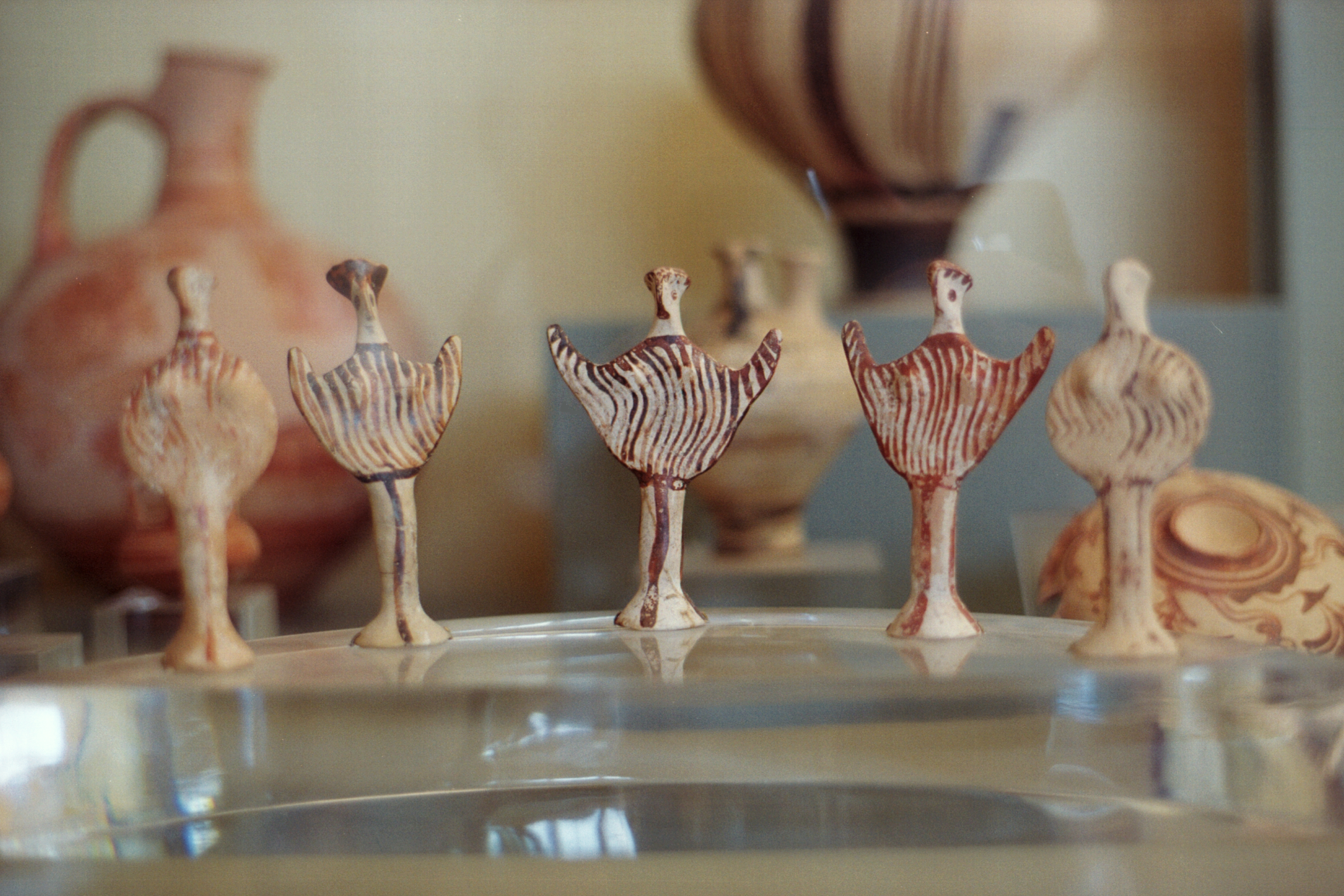
Mycenaean figurines, so called Bird goddesses, 1400-1200 BC

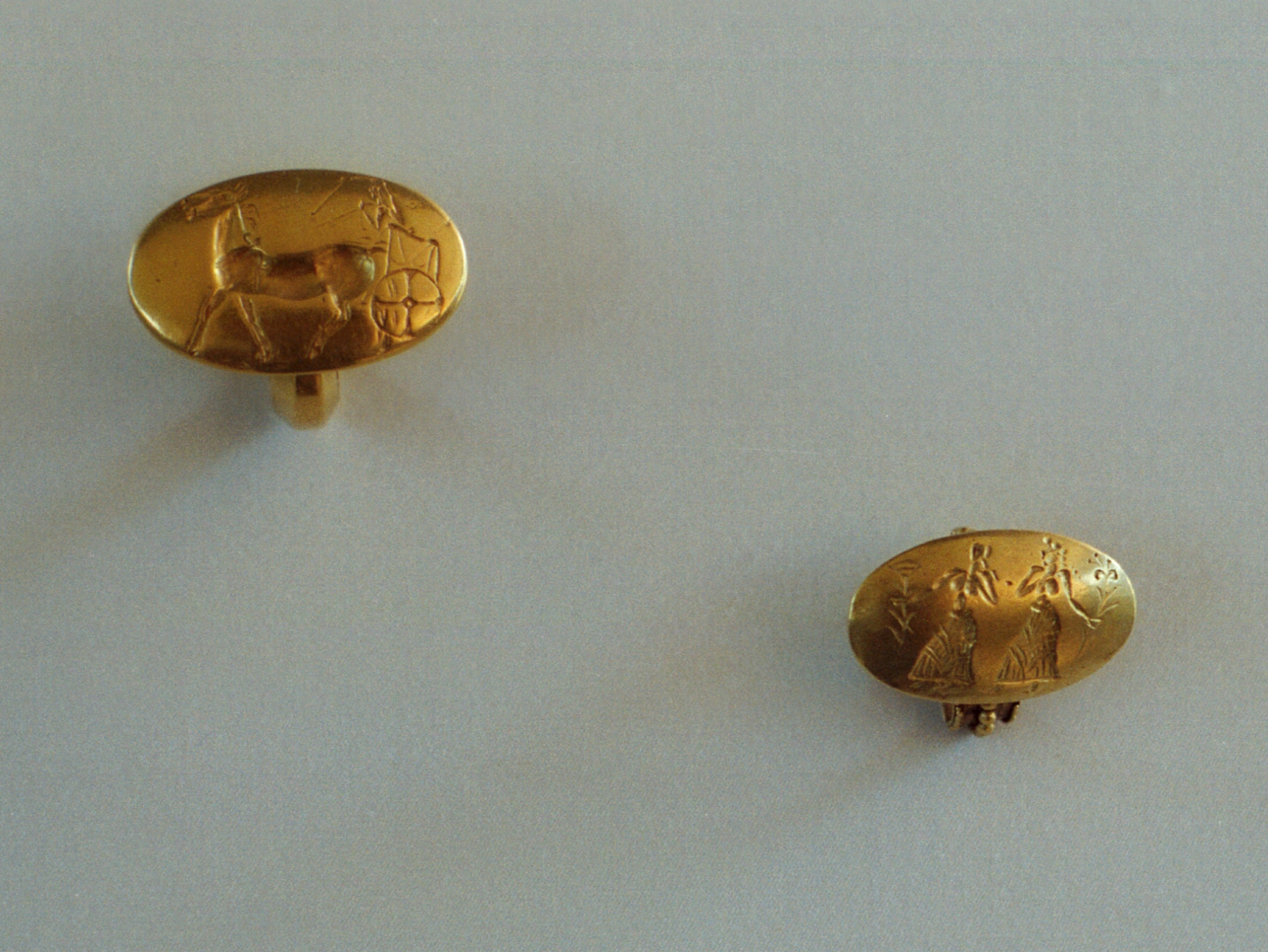
Gold rings with reliefs, Late Helladic (Mycenaean)

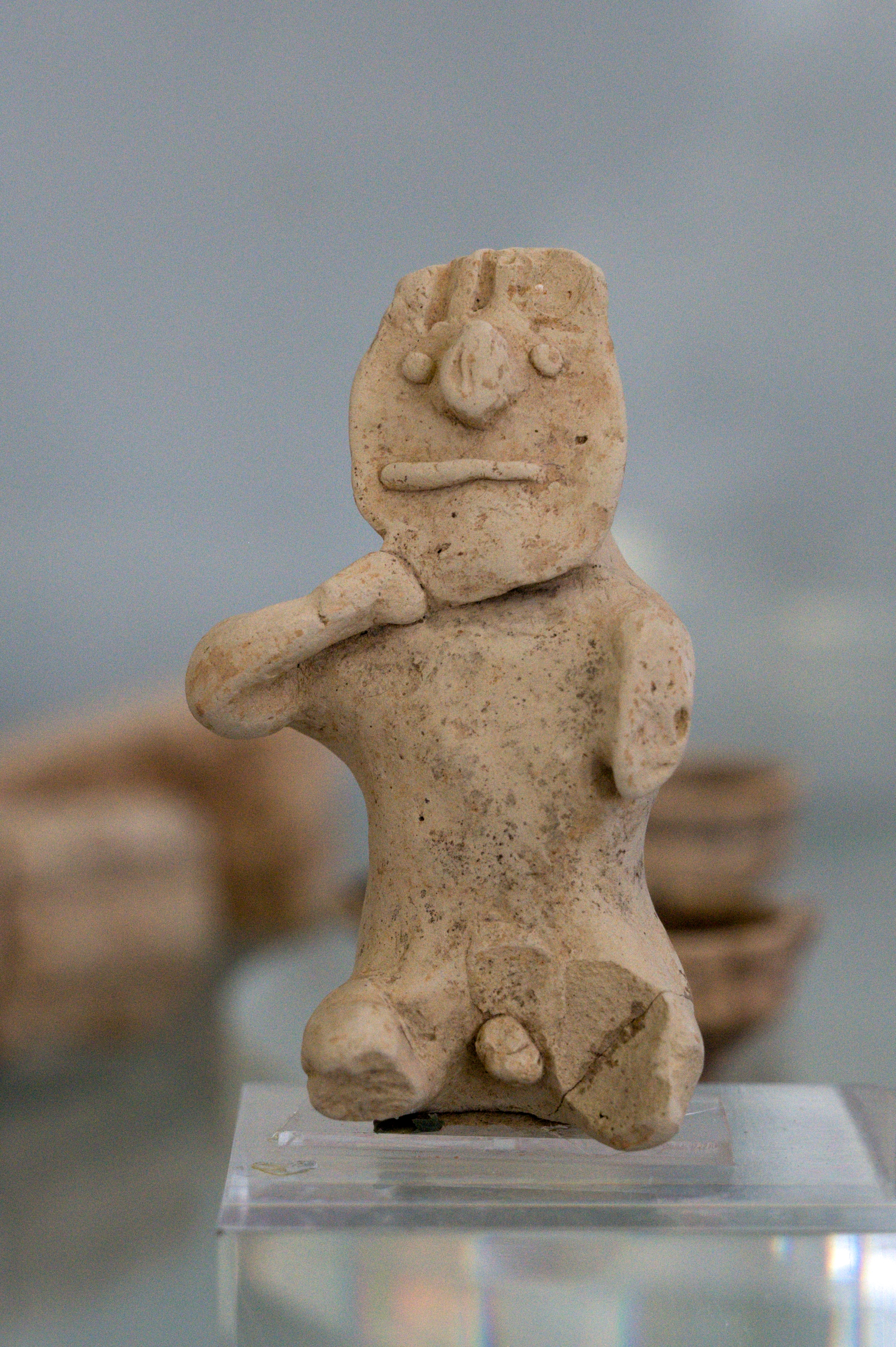
Small child, probably Opheltes, Sanctuary of Opheltes in Nemea. See Pausanias II, 15, 3.

The museum puts on display a collection of discoveries from the Early Helladic era until the Early Christian period. These finds were excavated at ancient Nemea, Kleones, Fliountas, and the Mycenaean cemetery of Aidonia. The most significant finds are the pieces of gold jewelry dating back to the 15th century BC.
