= Mind and Madness in Ancient Greece =

1978 book by Bennett Simon

- First edition
- Author: Bennet Simon
- Language: English
- Genre: Non-fiction
- Publisher: Cornell University Press
- Publication date: 1978
- Publication place: United States
- ISBN: 9780801492020

Mind and Madness in Ancient Greece: The Classical Roots of Modern Psychiatry is a medical book by Bennett Simon. It was published by Cornell University Press in 1978 and reprinted on August 31, 1980.

== Bibliography ==
- Mind and madness in ancient Greece: the classical roots of modern psychiatry Cornell University Press, 1980, ISBN 9780801492020
