= Michas =

Michas is a surname and masculine given name which may refer to:

- Christos Michas (1933–2010), Greek football referee banned for life following an investigation
- Ireneusz Michaś (1938–2023), Polish politician
- Kyriakos Michas (born 1966), Greek football manager
- Takis Michas, Greek journalist and author
- Michaś Čarot (1896–1937), Belarusian poet, playwright and novelist
- Michaš Kukabaka (born 1936), Soviet Belarusian dissident
- Michaś Naŭmovič (1922–2004), a prominent figure of the Belarusian diaspora in France and artist
