= Neos Kafkasos =

Village in Macedonia, Greece

Neos Kafkasos Νέος Καύκασος
- Community
- Location within Greece
- Coordinates: 40°53′26″N 21°28′23″E
- Country: Greece
- Geographic region: Macedonia
- Administrative region: Western Macedonia
- Regional unit: Florina
- Municipality: Florina
- Municipal unit: Kato Kleines

Population (2021)
  - Community: 192
- Time zone: UTC+2 (EET)
  - Summer (DST): UTC+3 (EEST)

Neos Kafkasos (Greek: Νέος Καύκασος) is a village in the Florina Regional Unit of Macedonia, Greece.

Following the Greek–Turkish population exchange, the Greek state organised the resettlement of Greek refugees and in the Florina area a new border village was built for them called Neos Kafkasos. In 1926 there were 155 refugee families from the Caucasus in the village. The refugee families had come from the province of Kars Oblast (later ceded to Turkey) where under Russian rule (1878–1918) they arrived from Pontus and were resettled by the imperial government, serving as border guards on the Ottoman–Russian frontier. The 1928 Greek census recorded 604 village inhabitants in Neos Kafkasos. In 1928, the refugee families numbered 154 (534 people).

Neos Kafkasos had 348 inhabitants in 1981. In fieldwork done by anthropologist Riki Van Boeschoten in late 1993, Neos Kafkasos was populated by a Greek population descended from Anatolian Greek refugees who arrived during the population exchange. Pontic Greek was spoken by people over 60, mainly in private.
