= Jean-Claude Michéa =

French philosopher (born 1950)

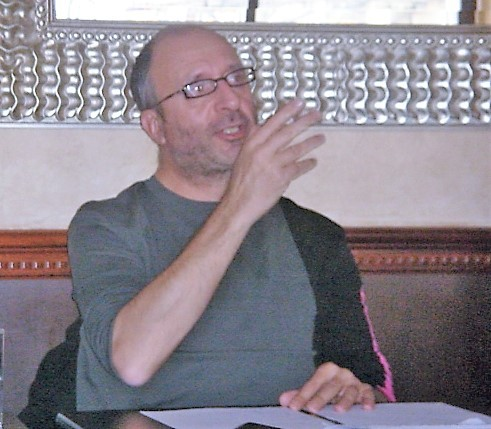
- Michéa in 2008
- Born: 1950 (age 75–76); Paris, France

Education
- Education: Lycée Paul Valéry; Paris-Sorbonne University

Philosophical work
- Era: 21st-century philosophy
- Region: Western philosophy
- School: Continental philosophy Libertarian socialism
- Notable ideas: Liberalism justifying itself as the empire of the lesser evil

Jean-Claude Michéa (French: [ʒɑ̃klod miʃea]; born 1950) is a French philosopher, author of several essays devoted in particular to the thought and work of George Orwell.

A libertarian socialist, he is known for his committed positions against the dominant currents of the left which, according to him, has lost all spirits of anti-capitalist struggle to make way for the "religion of progress". Advocating several moral values near the socialism of Orwell, Michéa excoriates the leftist intelligentsia that has, in his view, gotten away from the proletarian and popular world.

He champions collective moral values at odds with an increasingly individualistic and liberal world, which uses only the law and the economy to justify itself. He "considers that the liberal bourgeois models have prevailed upon socialism, in swallowing it up" and "regrets that socialism has accepted the political liberalism's theories".

== Bibliography ==
- Climats, ed. (1995). Orwell, anarchiste tory (in French). Climats. ISBN 978-2-84158-000-2.
- Climats, ed. (1998). Les Intellectuels, le peuple et le ballon rond (in French). Climats. ISBN 978-2-84158-093-4.
- Climats, ed. (1999). L'Enseignement de l'ignorance et ses conditions modernes (in French). Climats. ISBN 978-2-84158-121-4.
- Éditions du Tricorne, ed. (2001). Les Valeurs de l'homme contemporain (in French). Tricorne. ISBN 978-2-8293-0223-7. (with Alain Finkielkraut and Pascal Bruckner)
- Climats, ed. (2002). Impasse Adam Smith, brèves remarques sur l'impossibilité de dépasser le capitalisme sur sa gauche (in French)., republication Champs-Flammarion, 2006
- Climats, ed. (2003). Orwell éducateur (in French). Climats. ISBN 978-2-84158-233-4.
- Climats, ed. (2007). L'Empire du moindre mal : essai sur la civilisation libérale (in French). Paris. ISBN 978-2-08-122043-0., rep. Champs-Flammarion, 2010
- Champs-Flammarion, ed. (2008). La Double Pensée, retour sur la question libérale (in French). Paris. ISBN 978-2-08-121839-0.
- Climats, ed. (2011). Le Complexe d'Orphée : la gauche, les gens ordinaires et la religion du progrès (in French). Climats. ISBN 978-2-08-126047-4.
- L'Âme de l'homme sous le capitalisme (in French), postscript of La Culture de l’égoïsme - Discussion entre C. Lasch et C.Castoriadis, Climats, 2012 ISBN 2081284634
- Climats, ed. (2013). Les Mystères de la gauche : de l'idéal des Lumières au triomphe du capitalisme absolu (in French). Climats. ISBN 978-2-08-129789-0.
- Flammarion, Climats, ed. (2014). Le plus beau but est une passe (in French). Paris. ISBN 978-2-08-131314-9.
- Flammarion, ed. (2014). La Gauche et le Peuple : lettres croisées (in French). Paris. ISBN 978-2-08-131313-2. ; with Jacques Julliard
- Flammarion, Climats, ed. (2016). Notre ennemi, le capital (in French). Paris. ISBN 978-2-08-139560-2.
- Flammarion, Climats, ed. (2018). Le loup dans la bergerie (in French). Paris. ISBN 978-2-08-143334-2.
- Vauban, ed. (2025). Towards a Conservative Left: Selected Writings of Jean-Claude Michéa. Blowing Rock. ISBN 979-8988739982.
