= Oberleutnant =

Officer's rank in the German, Swiss and Austrian armed forces

Oberleutnant (English: First Lieutenant) is a senior lieutenant officer rank in the German-speaking armed forces of Germany (Bundeswehr), the Austrian Armed Forces, and the Swiss Armed Forces. In Austria, Oberleutnant is also a designation for certain positions in the federal police and prison guards. In the former West Germany, it was also a rank in the Federal Border Protection (Bundesgrenzschutz).

== Austria ==
First lieutenant Oberleutnant
- Peaked cap

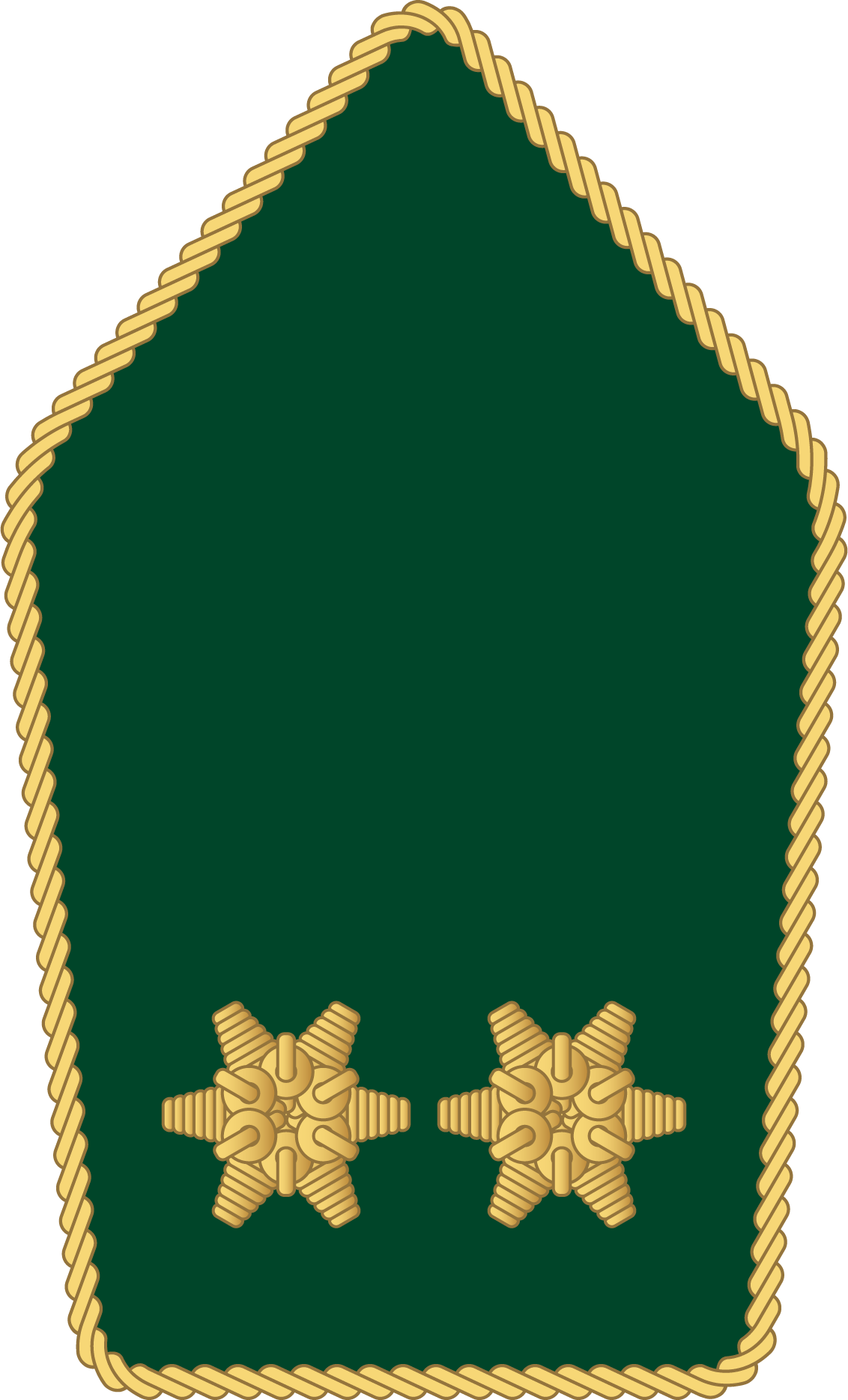
- Field uniform | service uniform
- Country: Austria
- Service branch: Austrian Armed Forces
- Abbreviation: Olt
- Rank group: Junior officer
- Non-NATO rank: OF-1
- Next higher rank: Hauptmann
- Next lower rank: Leutnant

== Germany ==
First lieutenant Oberleutnant
- Army and Air Force insignia
- Country: Germany
- Service branch: German Army; German Air Force
- Abbreviation: OLt
- NATO rank code: OF-1
- Formation: 1871
- Next higher rank: Hauptmann
- Next lower rank: Leutnant
- Equivalent ranks: Oberleutnant zur See

In the German Army, it dates from the early 19th century. Translated as "first lieutenant", the rank is typically bestowed upon commissioned officers after five to six years of active-duty service.

Oberleutnant is used by both the German Army and the German Air Force. In the NATO military comparison system, a German Oberleutnant is the equivalent of a first lieutenant in the Army/Air Forces of Allied nations.

Other uses

The equivalent naval rank is Oberleutnant zur See.

In Nazi Germany, within the SS, SA and Waffen-SS, the rank of Obersturmführer was considered the equivalent of an Oberleutnant in the German Army.

Rank insignias Oberleutnant/Oberleutnant zur See (OF-1)
Service uniform (basic form) (Armored corps)	Field uniform (Armored infantry)	San OA	Service uniform (basic form)	Field uniform	San OA	Shoulder strap	Sleeve insignia	Mountain loop	San OA

=== National People's Army ===
In the GDR National People's Army (NPA) the rank was the highest lieutenant rank, until 1990. This was in reference to Soviet military doctrine and in line with other armed forces of the Warsaw pact.

The equivalent rank in the Volksmarine (en: GDR Navy) was Oberleutnant zur See. Later it was shortened to simply Oberleutnant; however, internally Oberleutnant zur See continued to be used. With reference to the Soviet armed forces and to other armed forces of the Warsaw pact Oberleutnant was the second lowest officer rank until 1990.

Rank insignia
Land forces	Air Force	GDR Border troops	Volksmarine
	N/A		
Oberleutnant			Oberleutnant zur See

== See also ==
- Comparative army officer ranks of Europe
- Rank insignia of the German Bundeswehr
- Yliluutnantti

== Bibliography ==
- Flaherty, T. H. (2004) [1988]. The Third Reich: The SS. Time-Life Books, Inc. ISBN 1-84447-073-3.
- McNab, Chris (2009). The Third Reich. Amber Books Ltd. ISBN 978-1-906626-51-8.
