= Comparative army officer ranks of Europe =

Rank comparison chart of all armies and land forces of European states.

== Officers (OF 1–10) ==
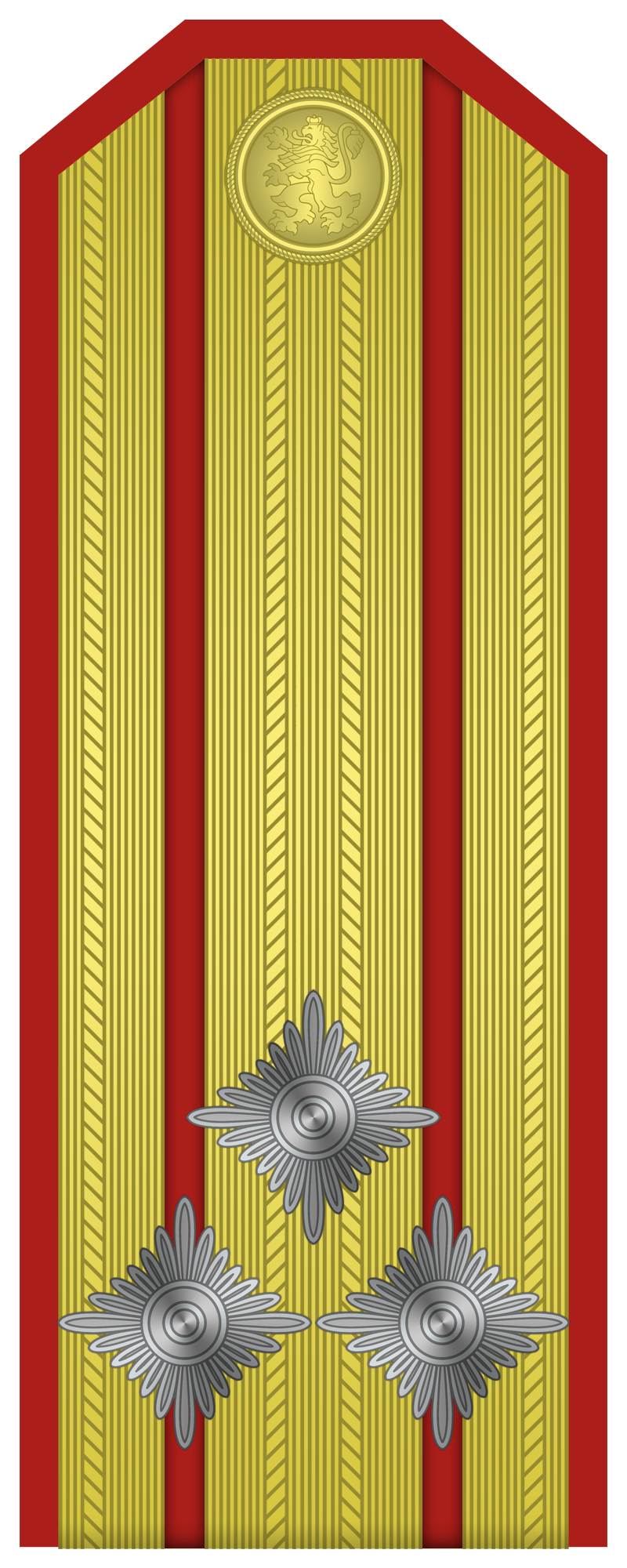
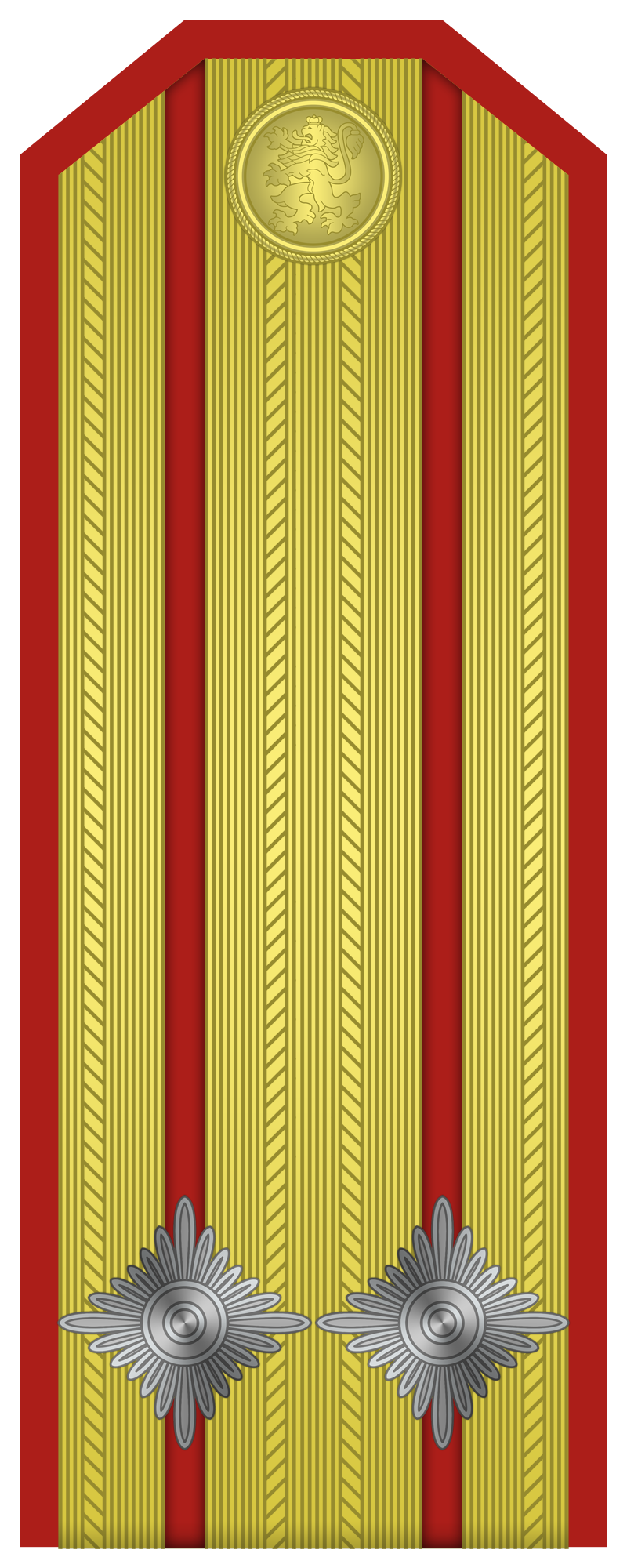
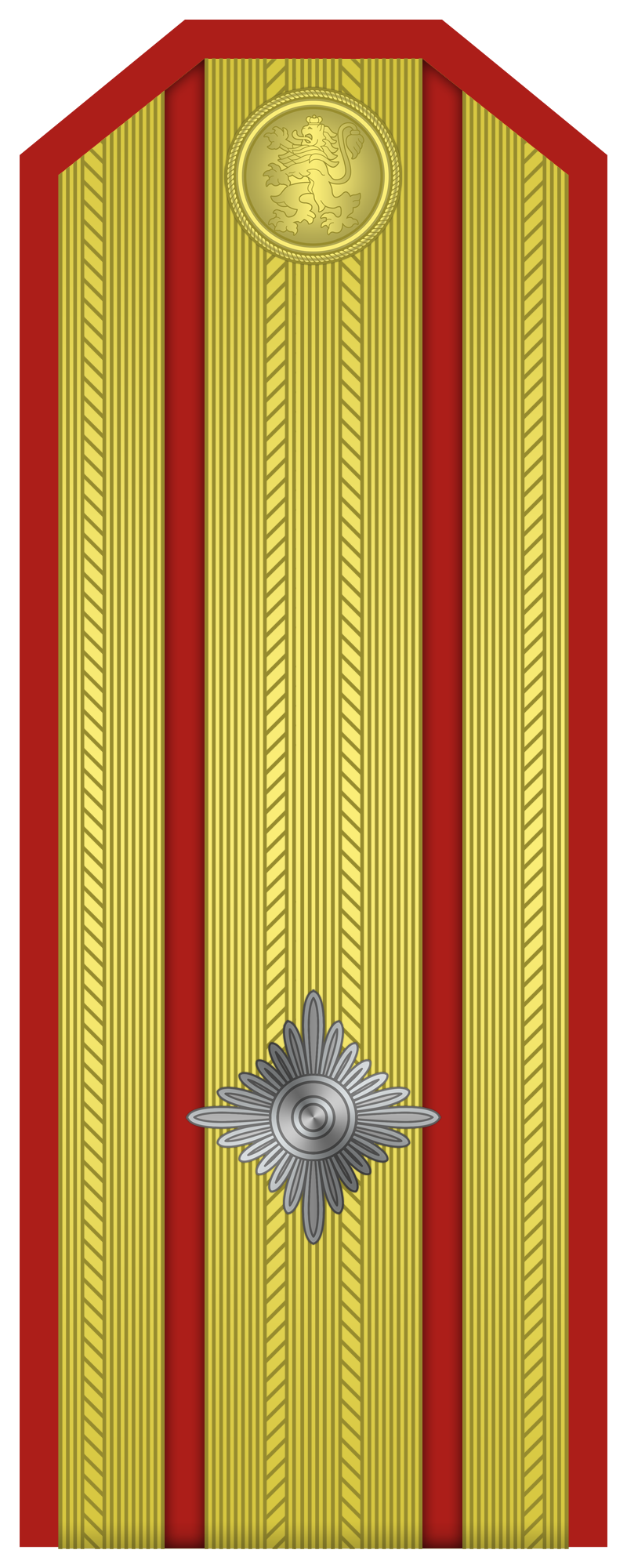
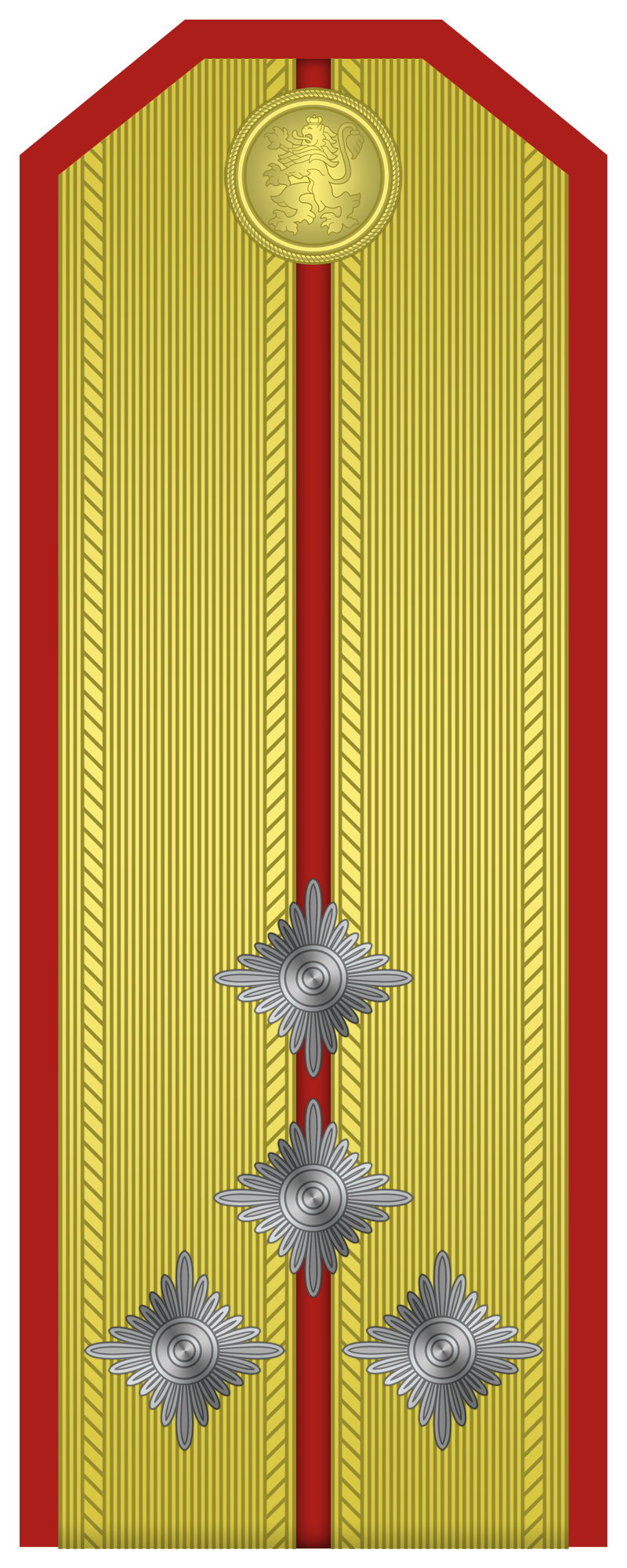
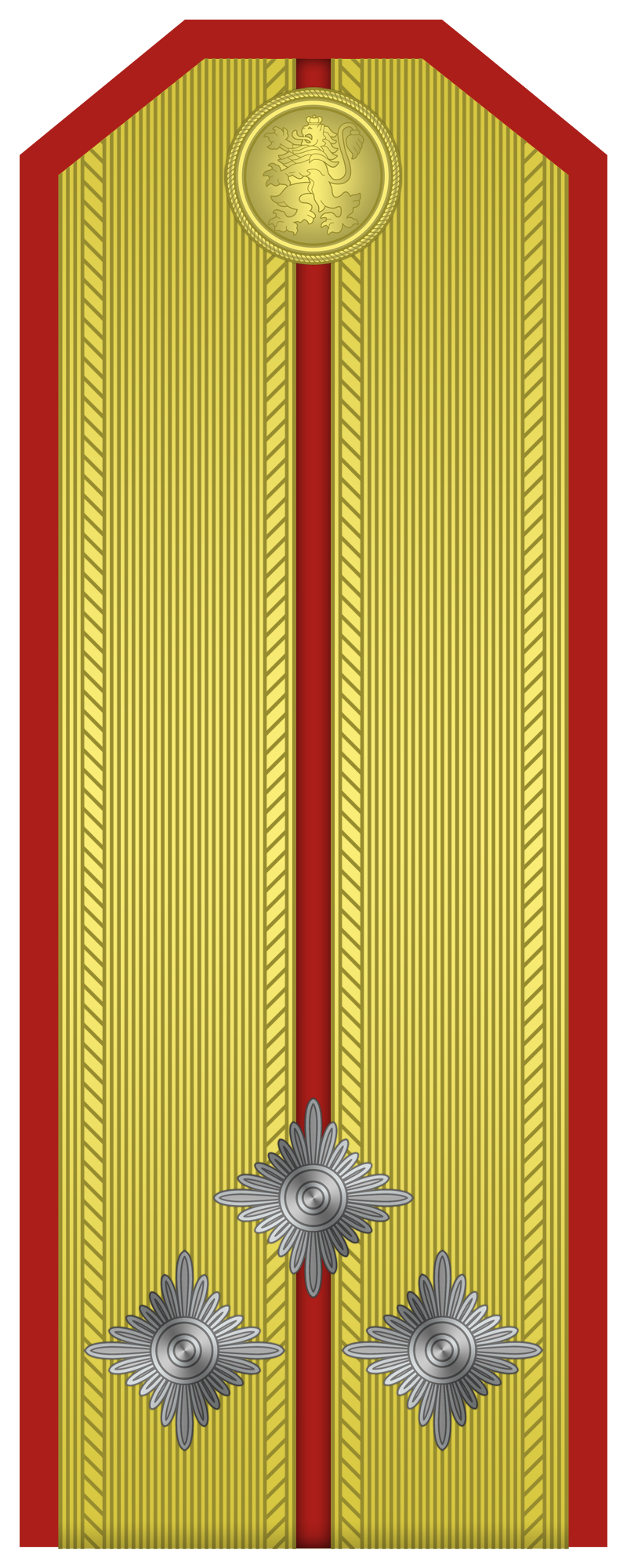
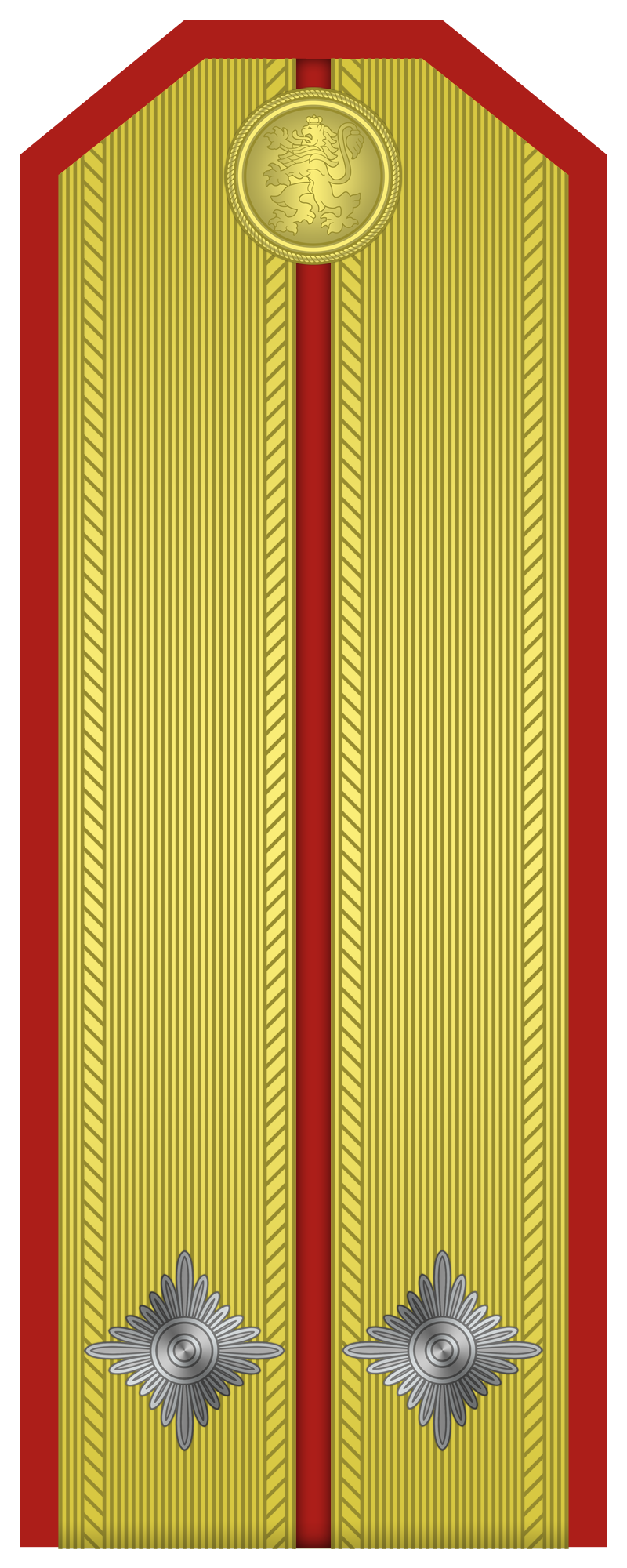
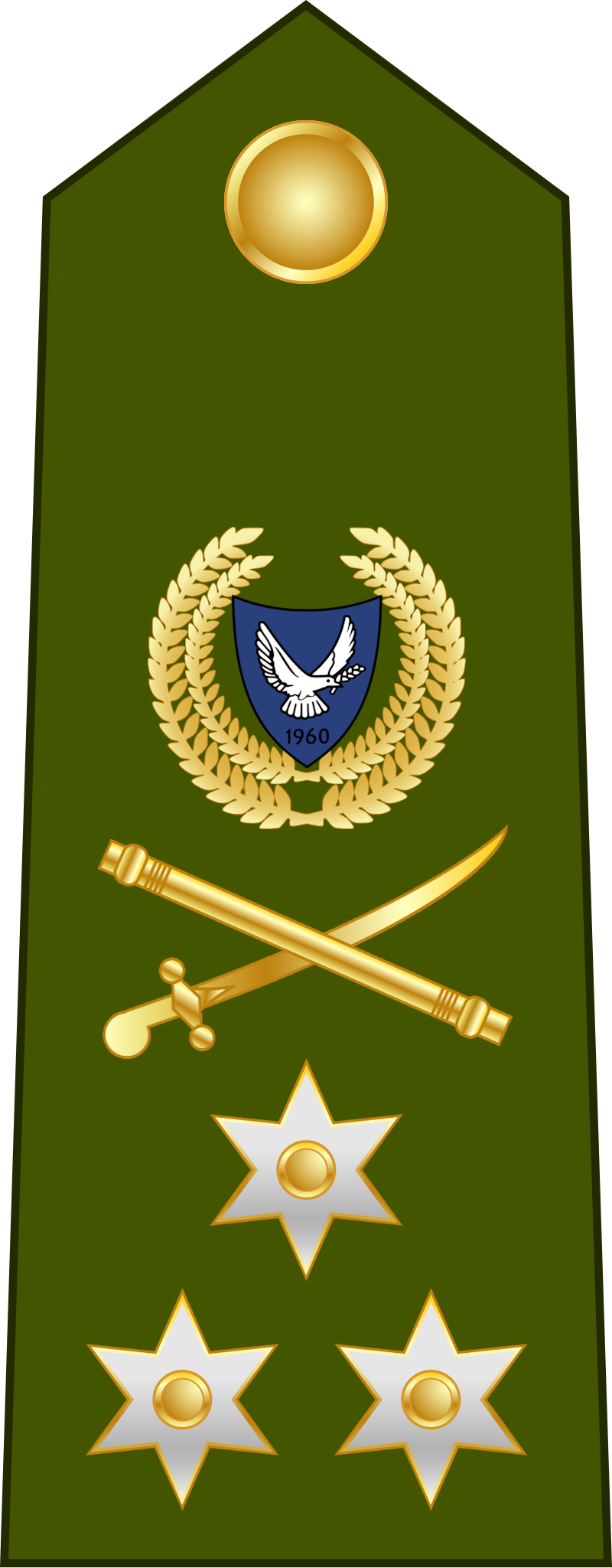
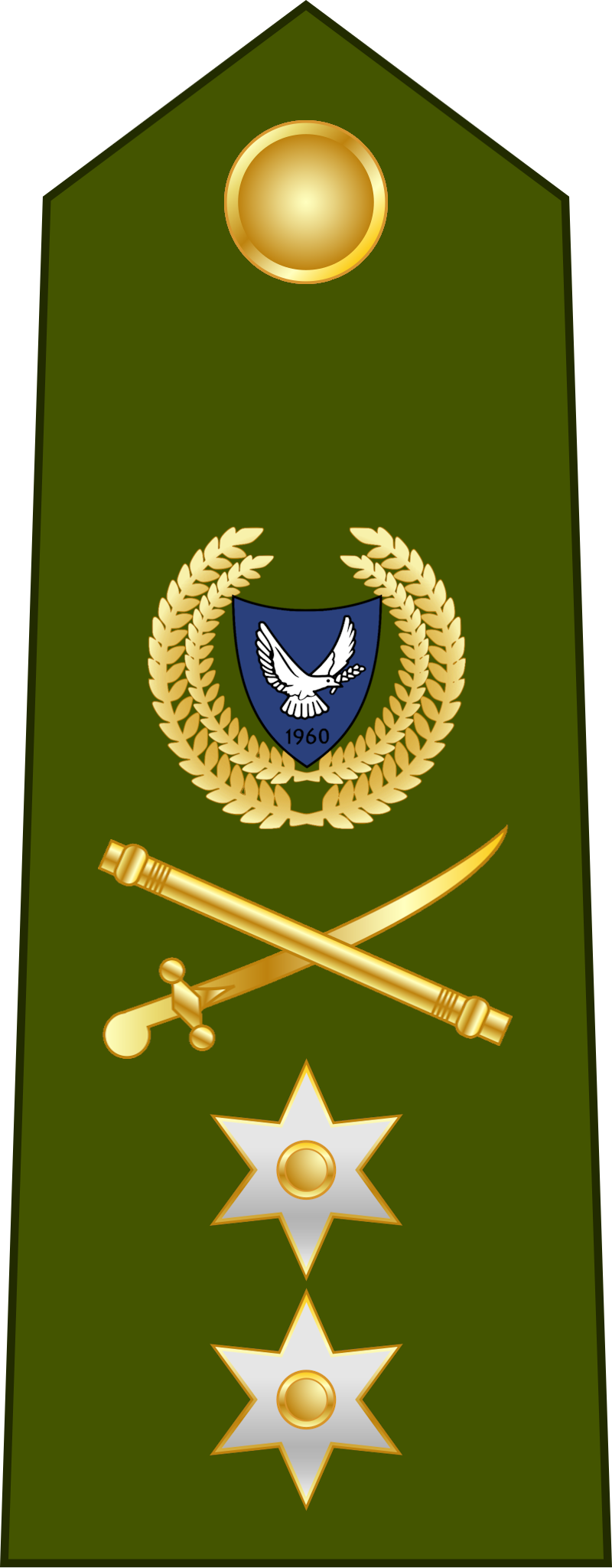
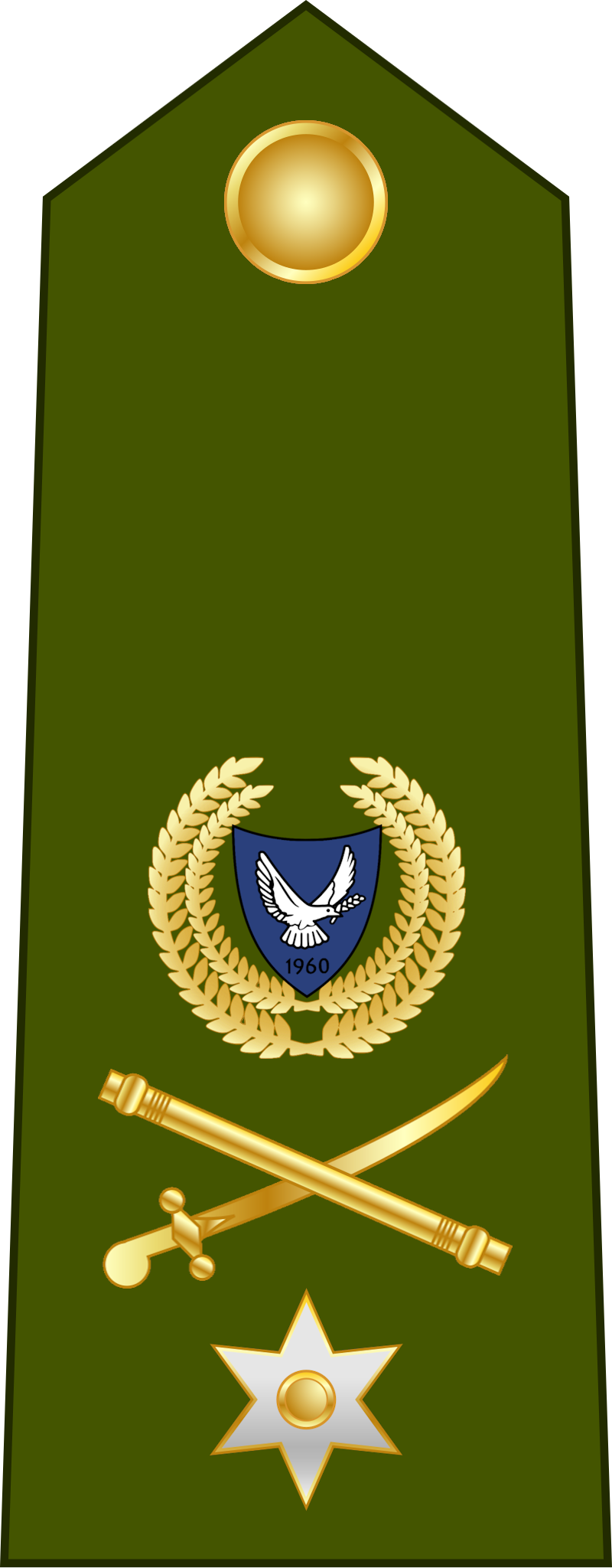
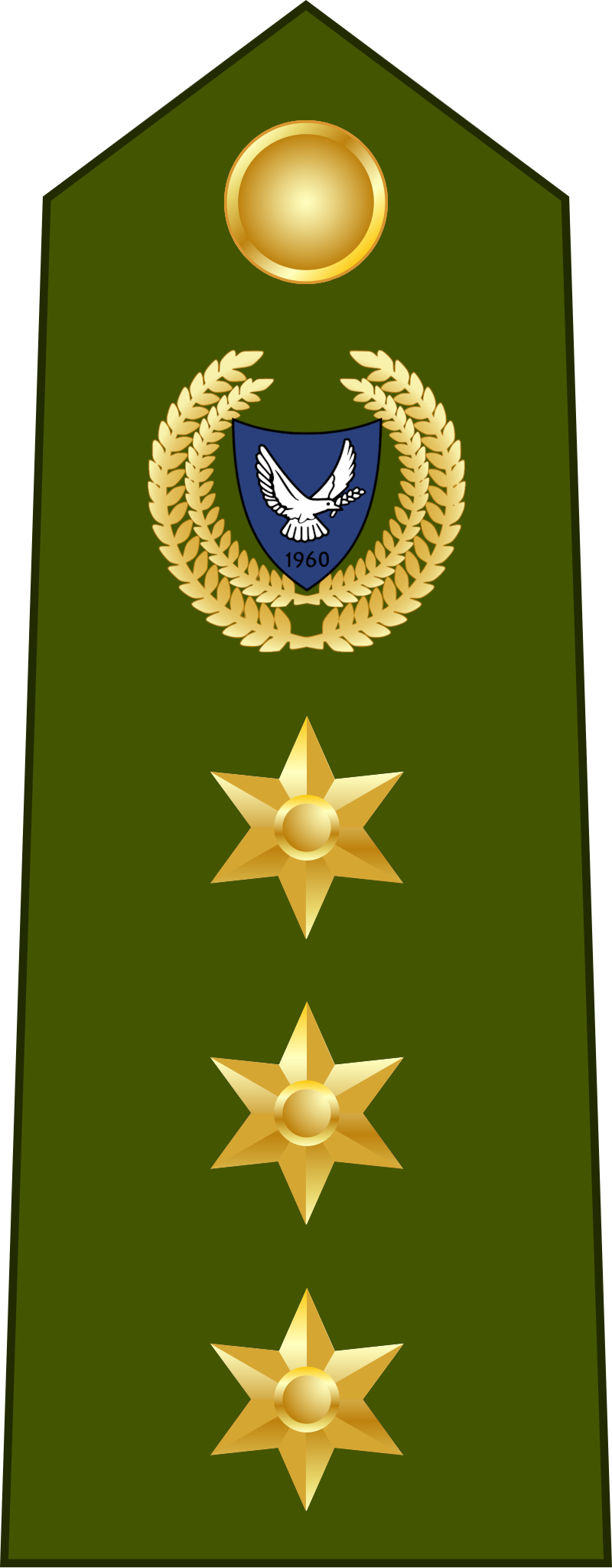
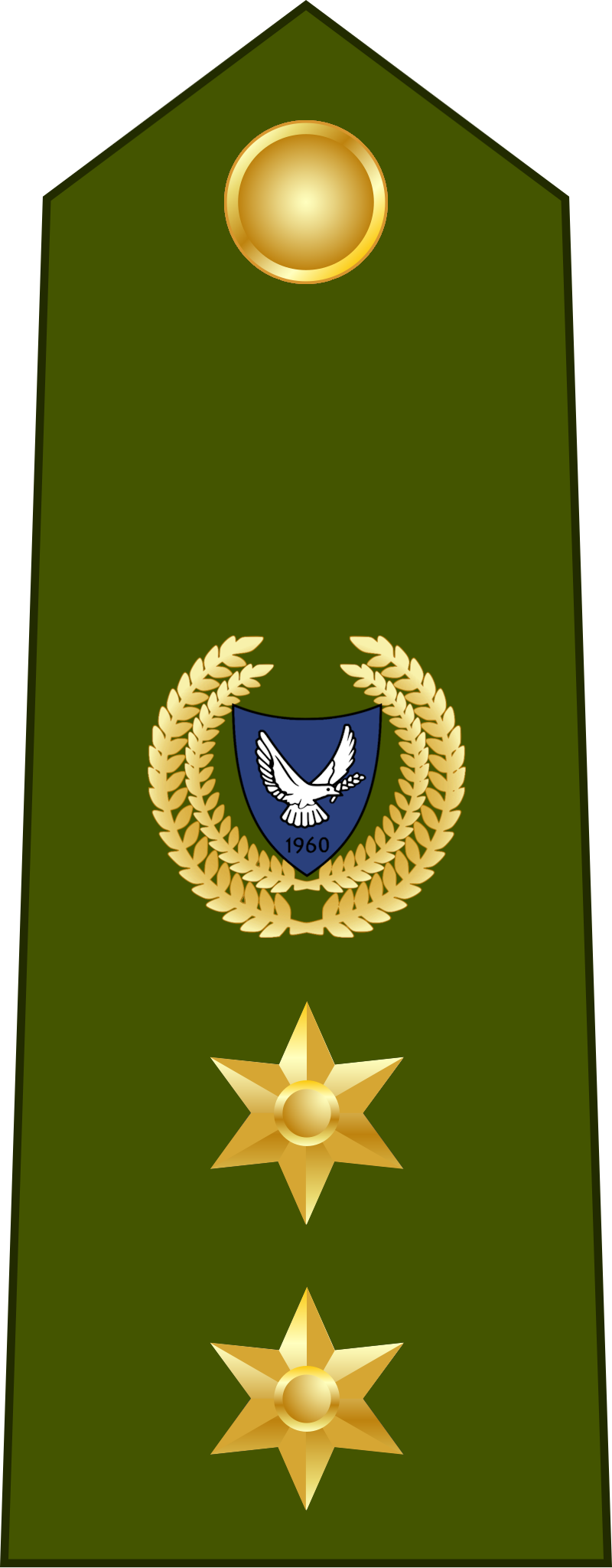
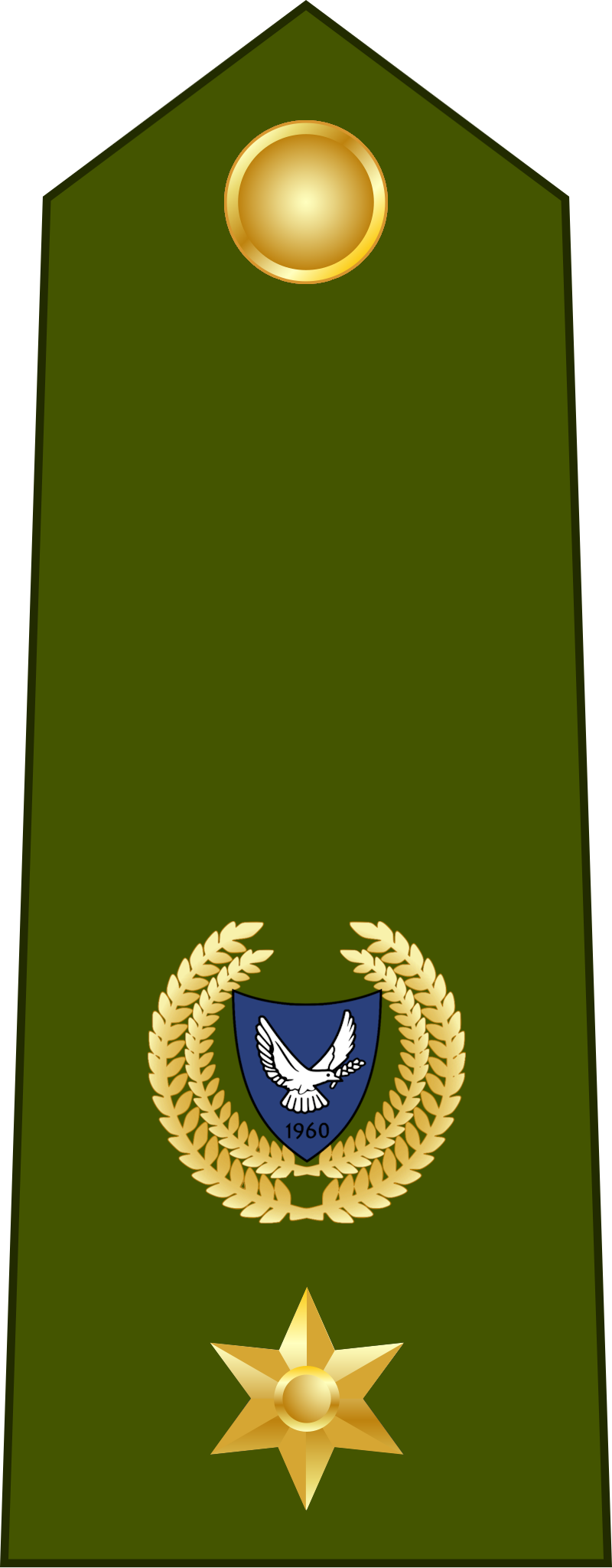
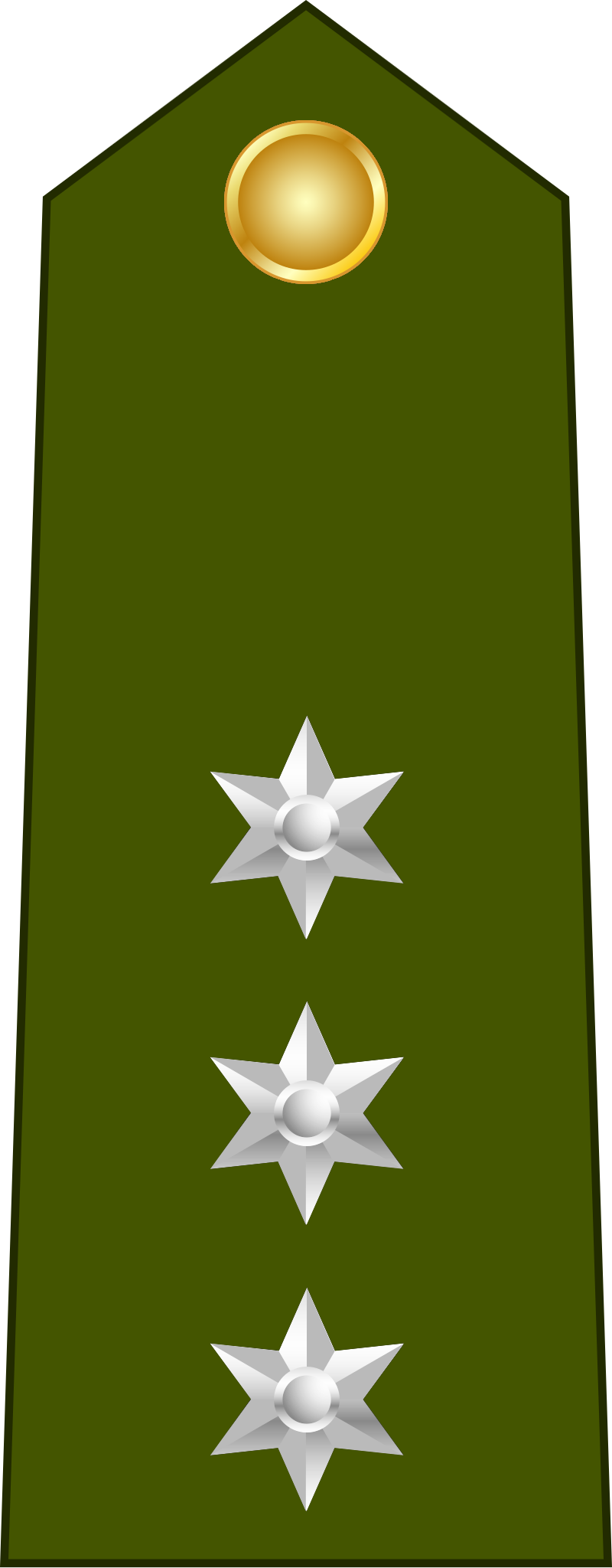
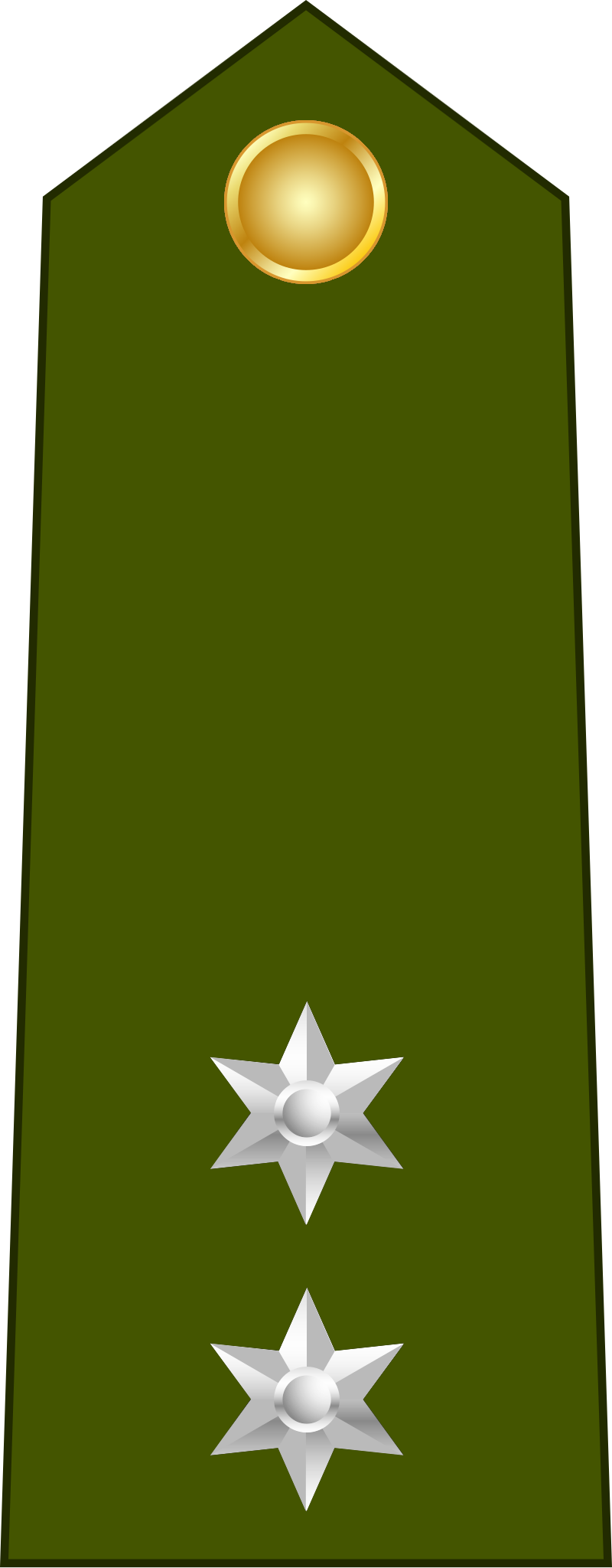
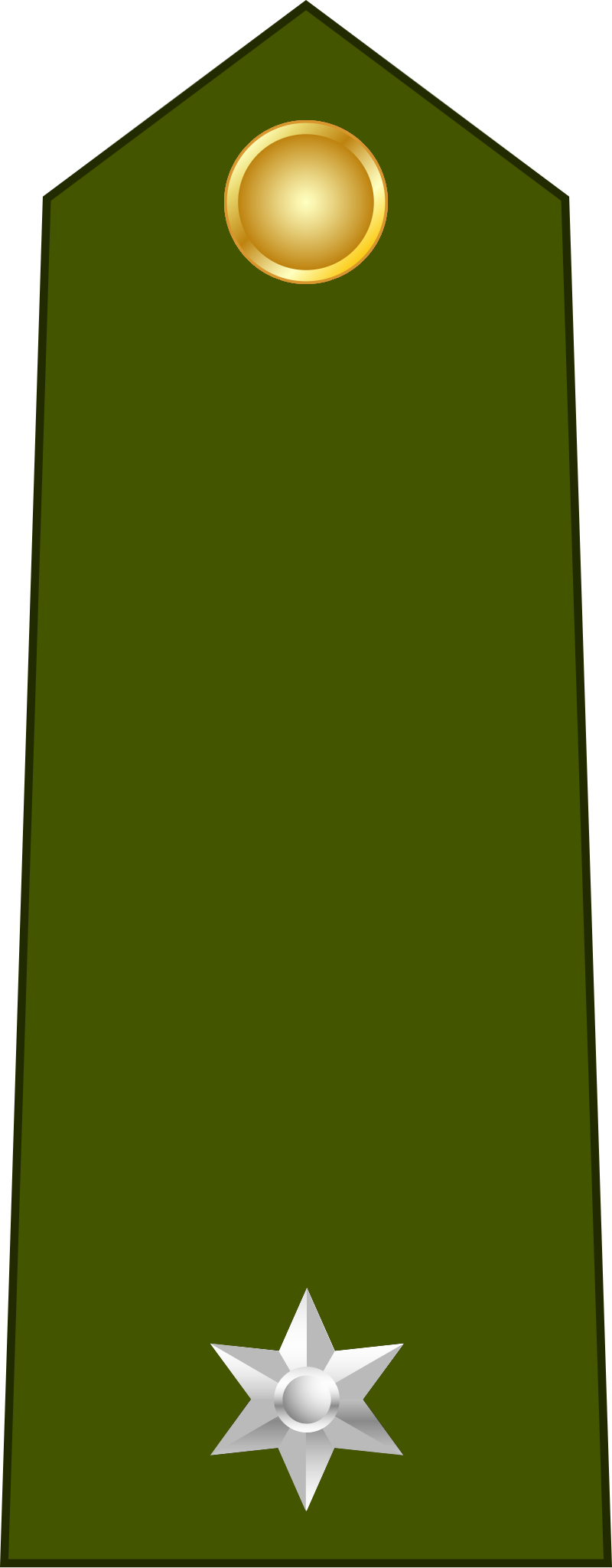
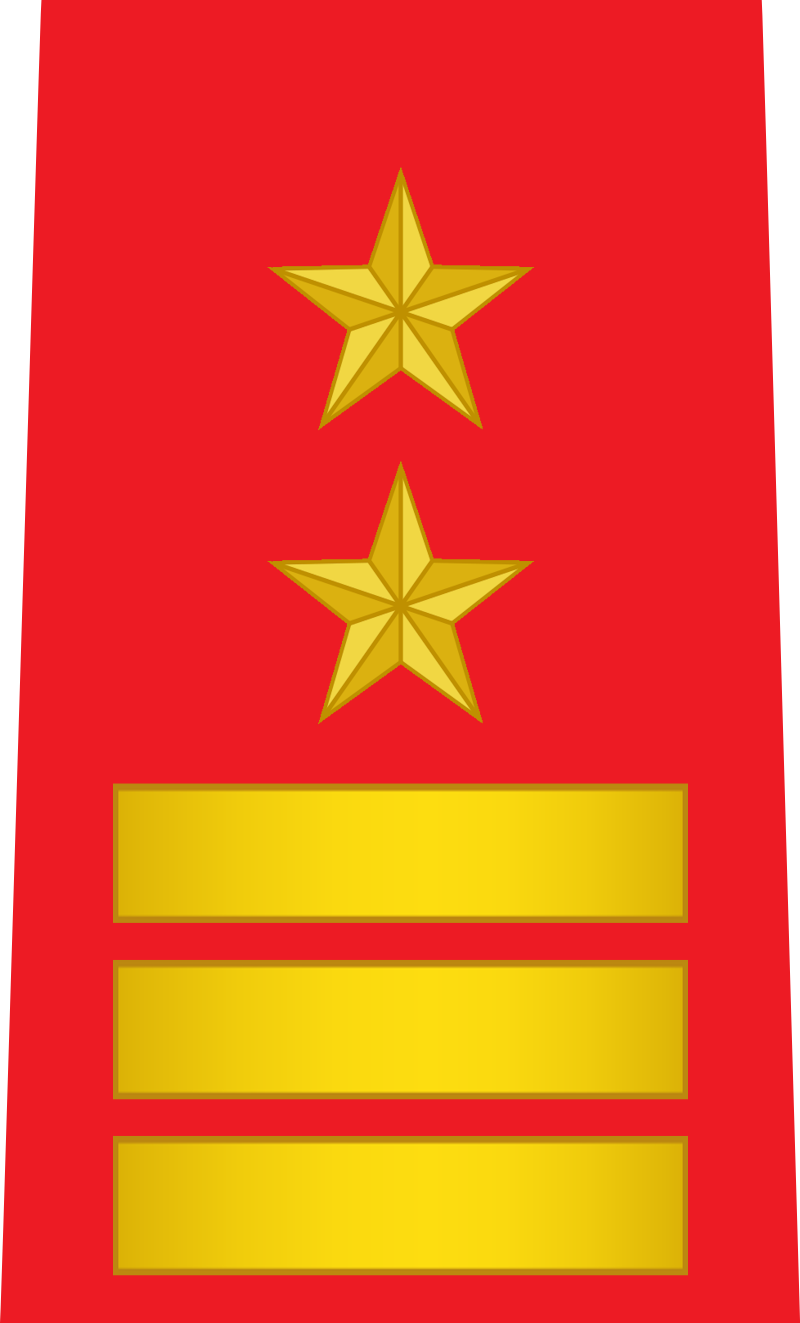
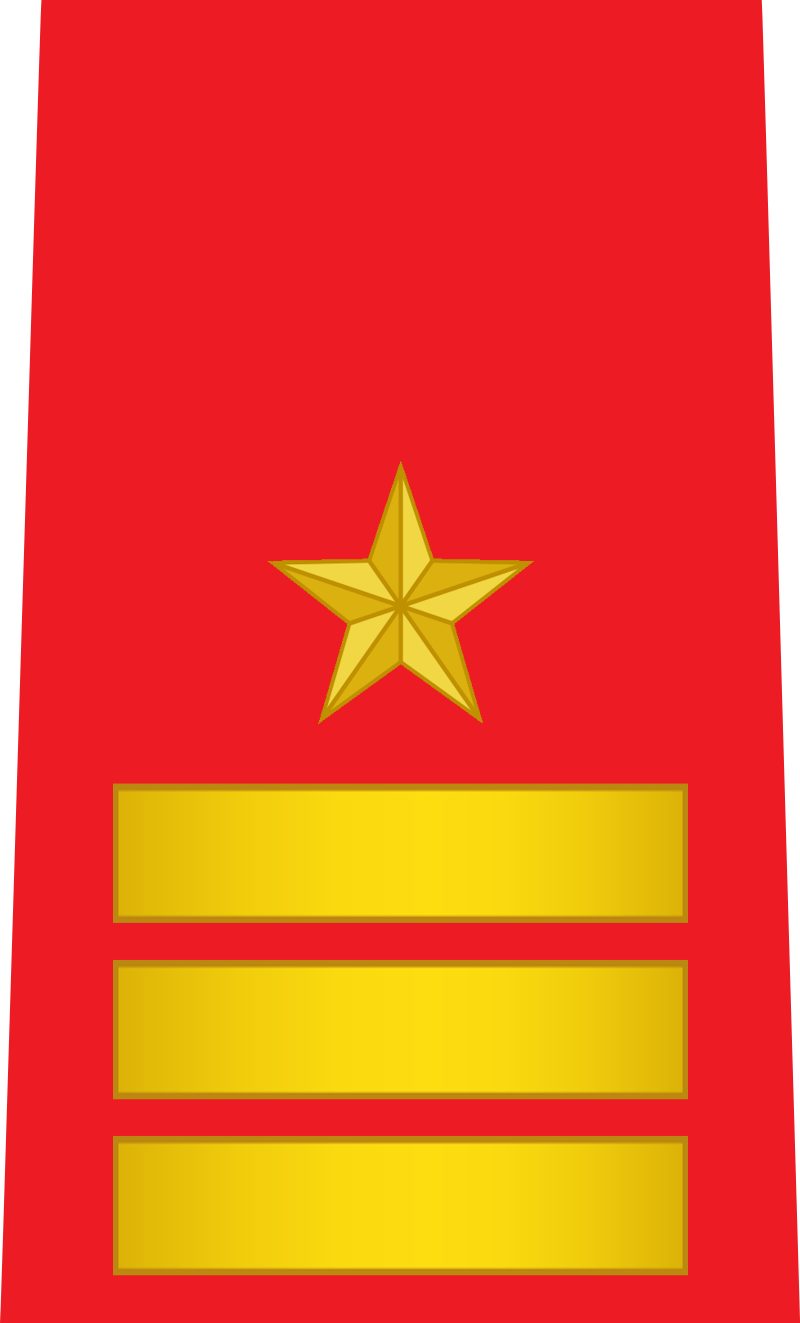
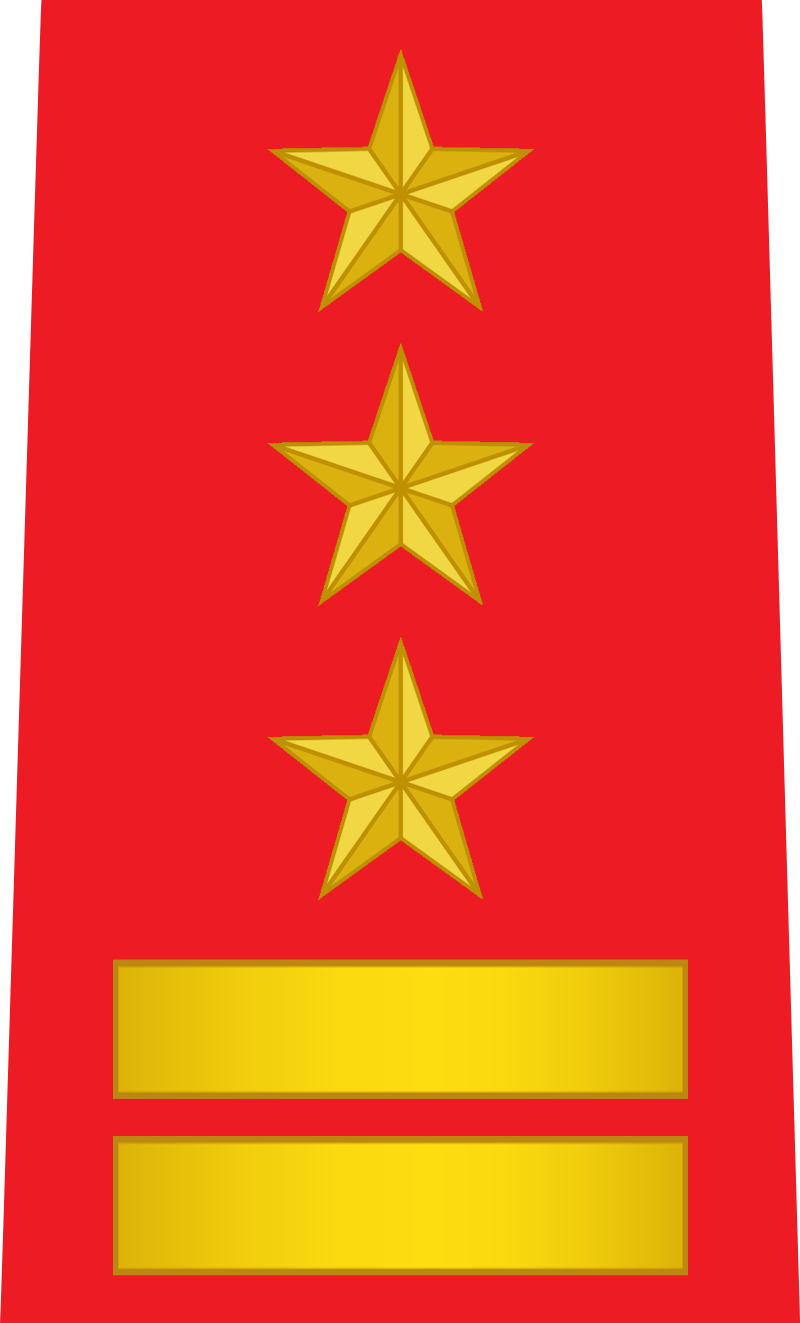
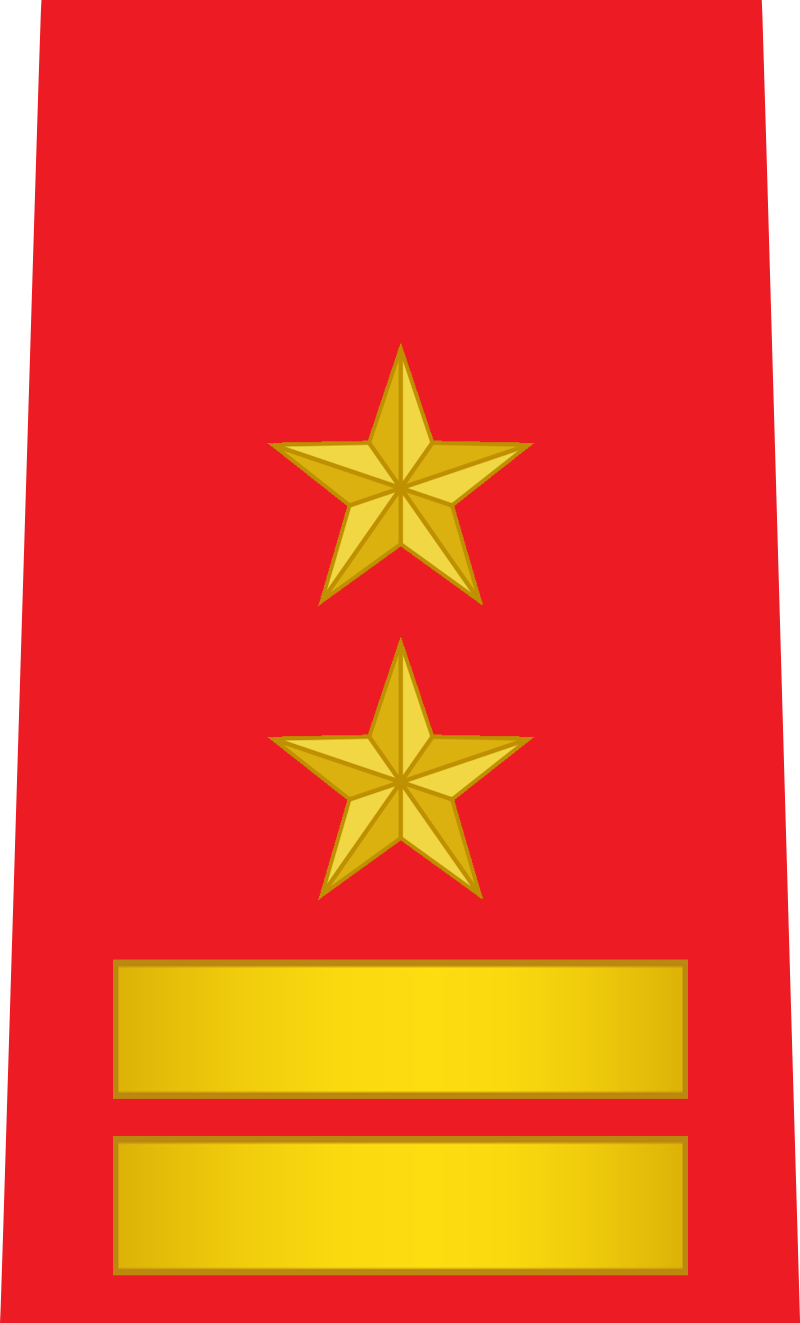
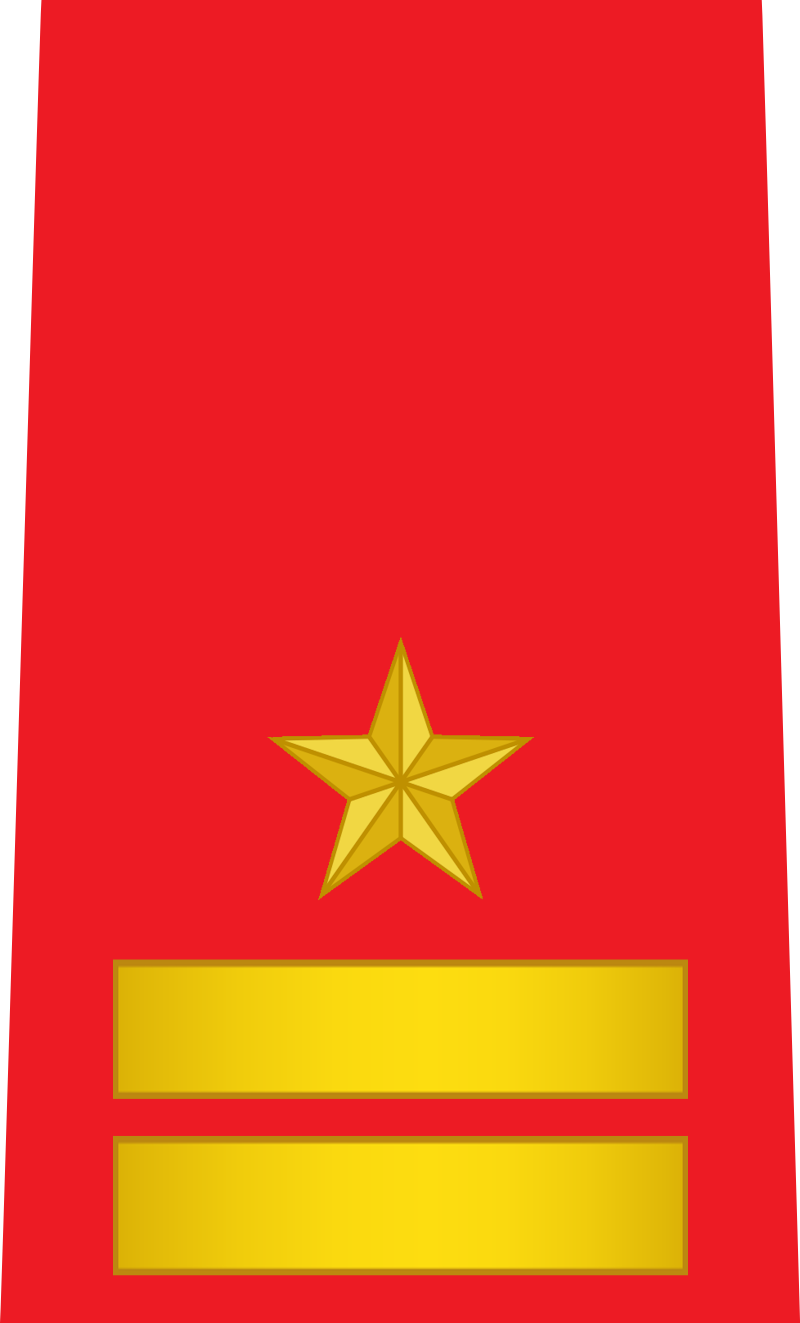
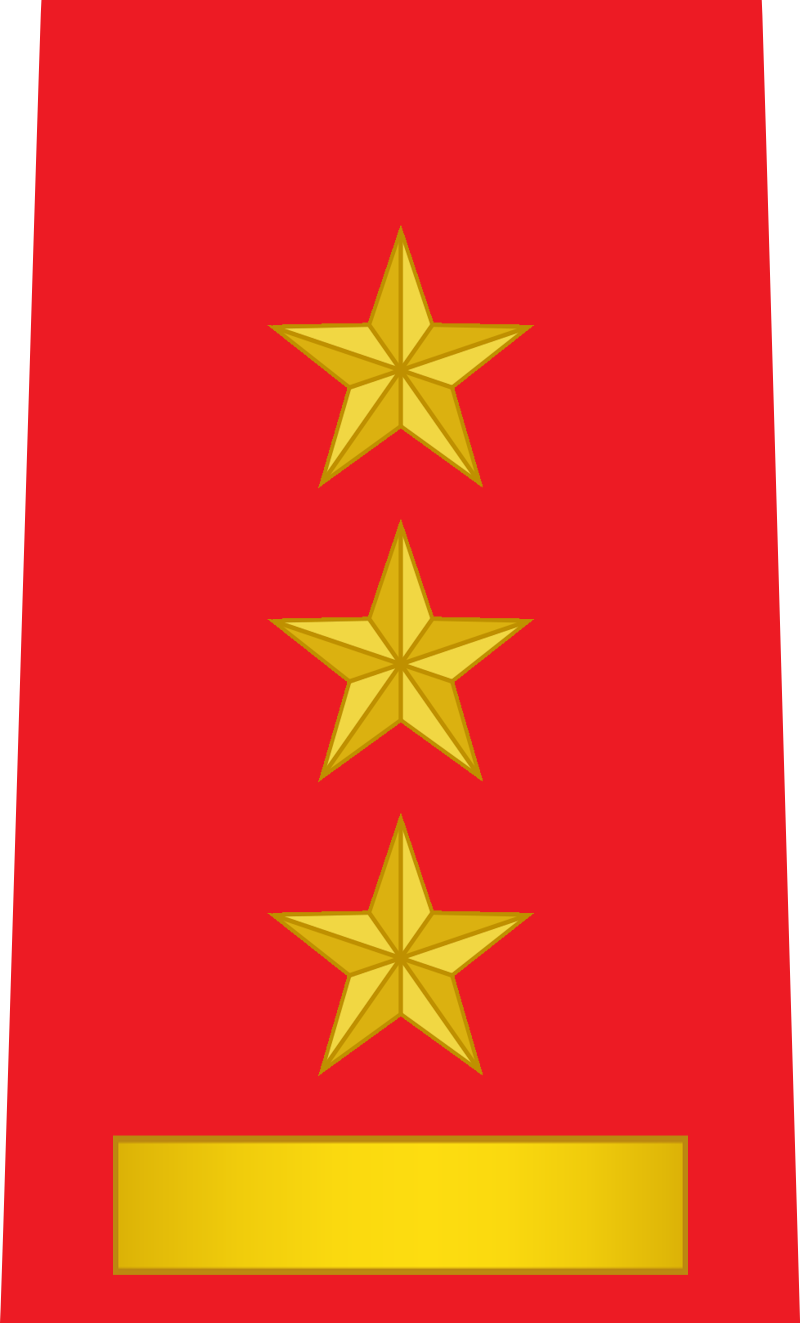
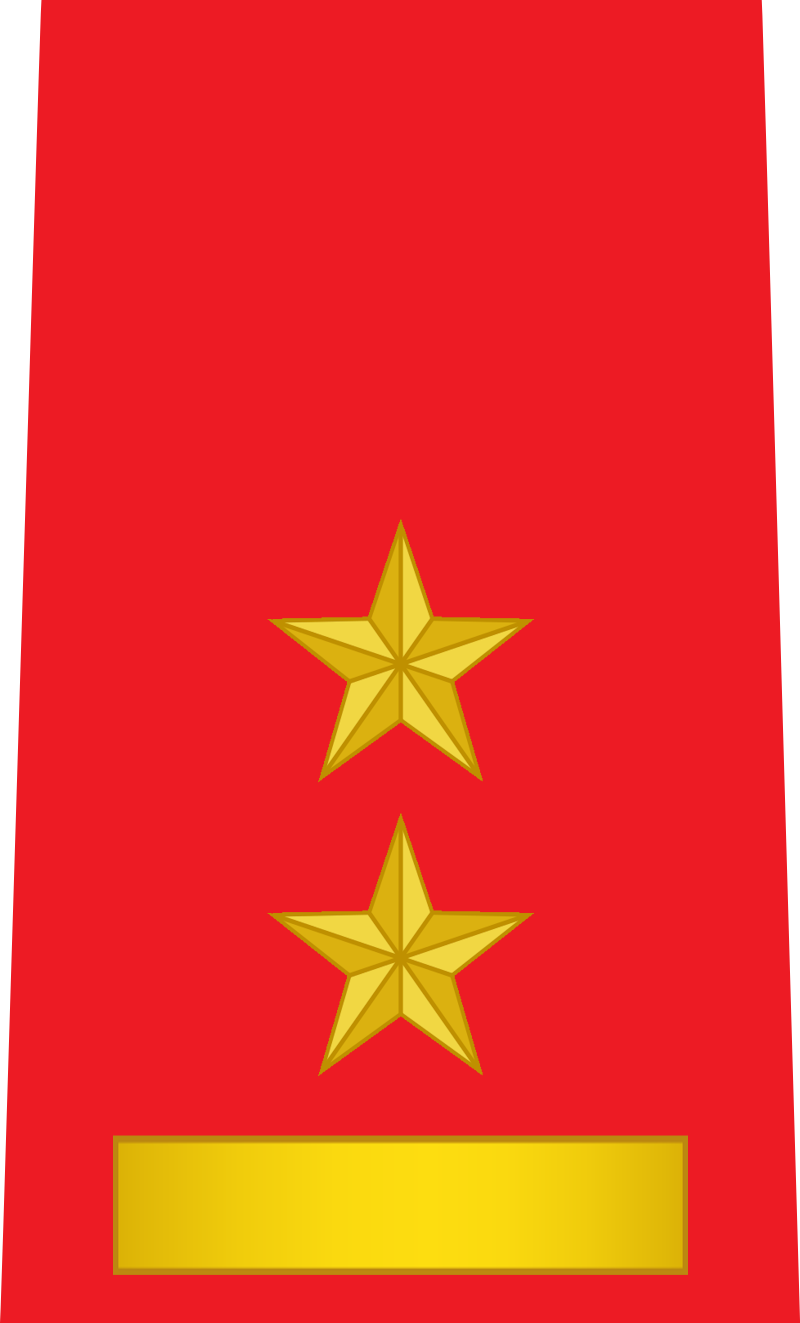
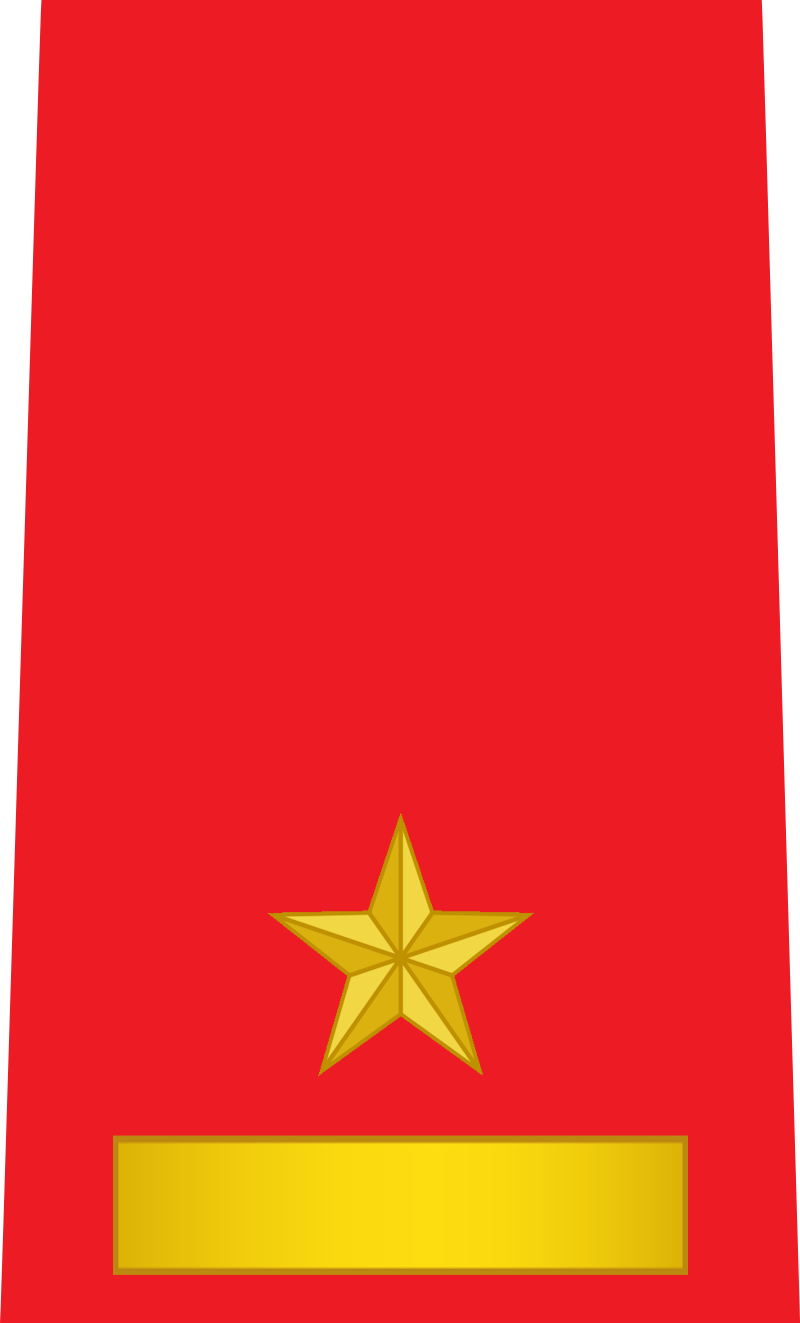
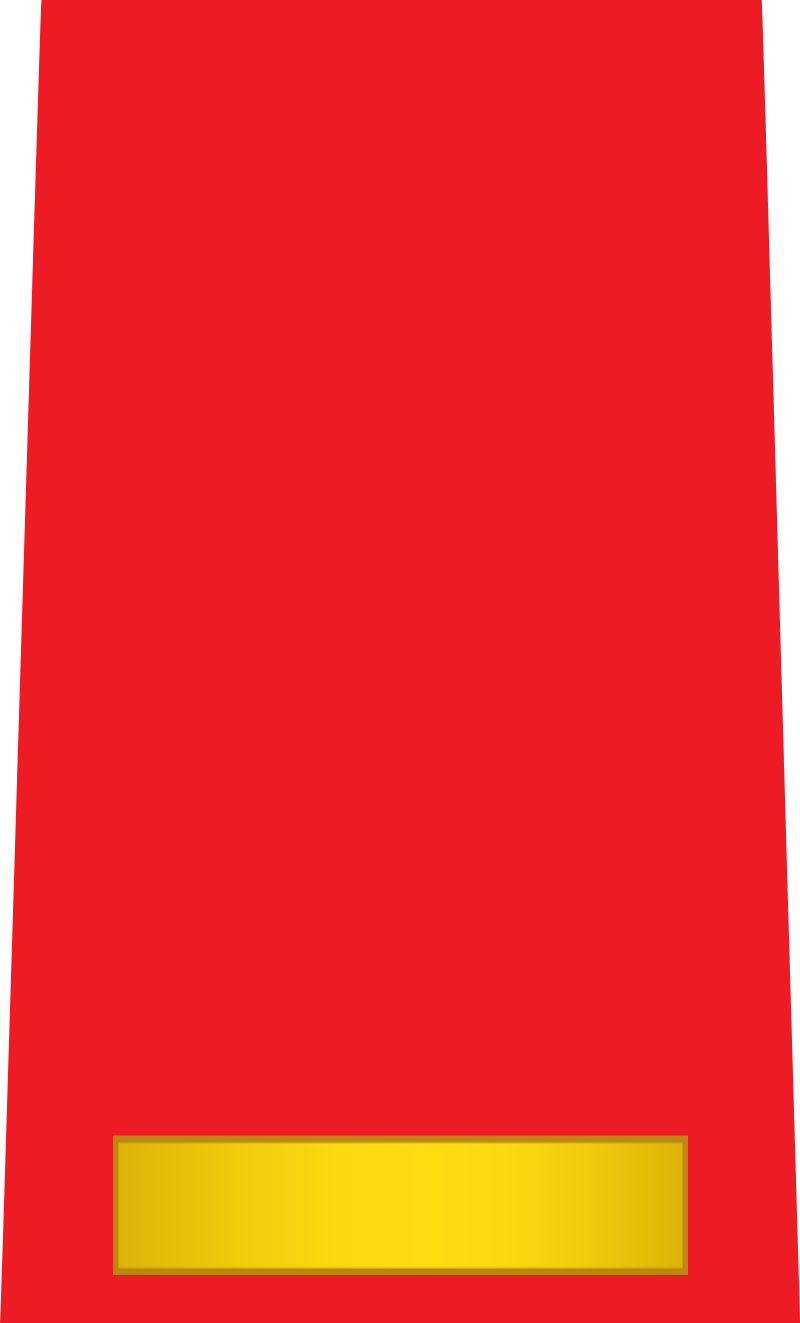
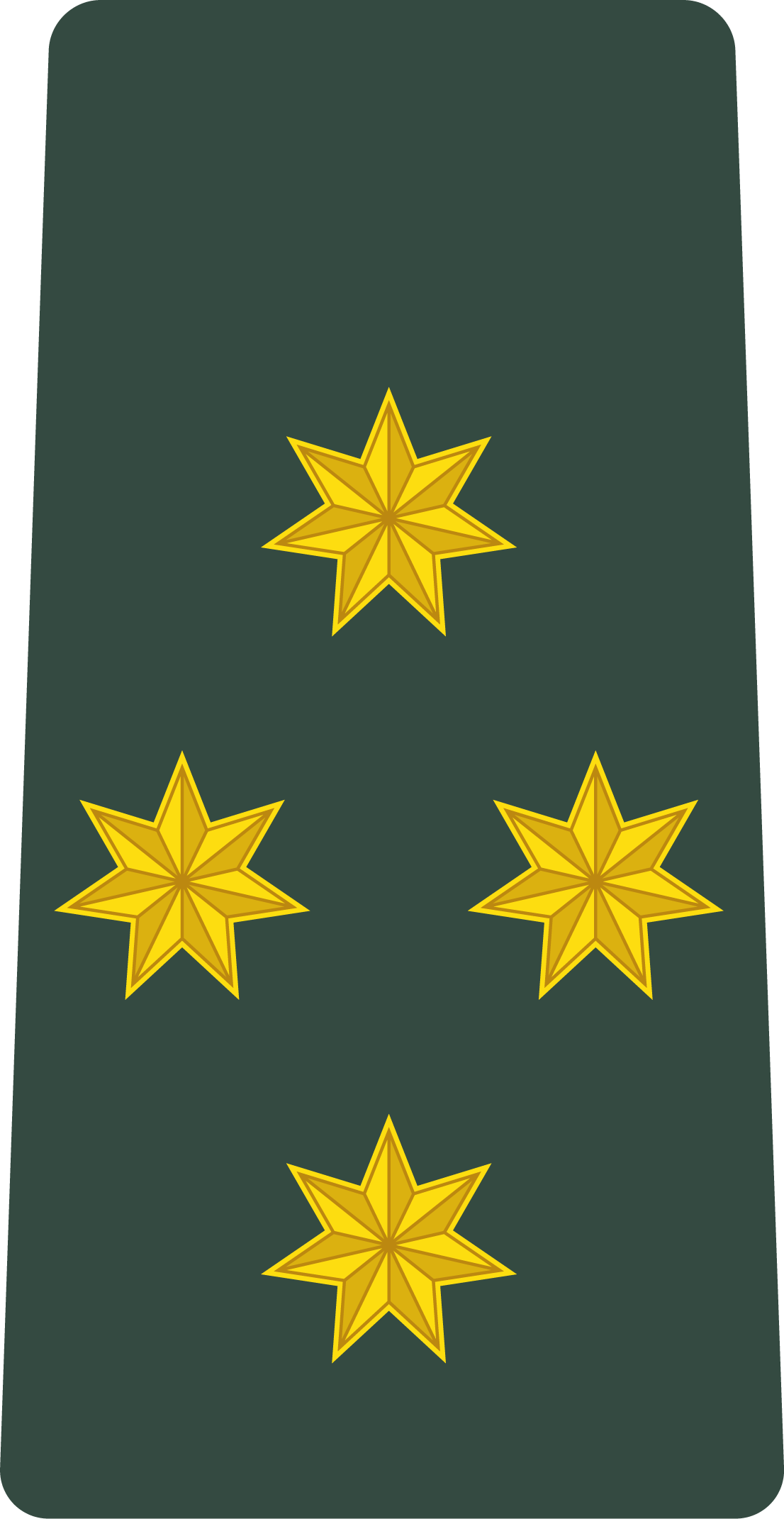
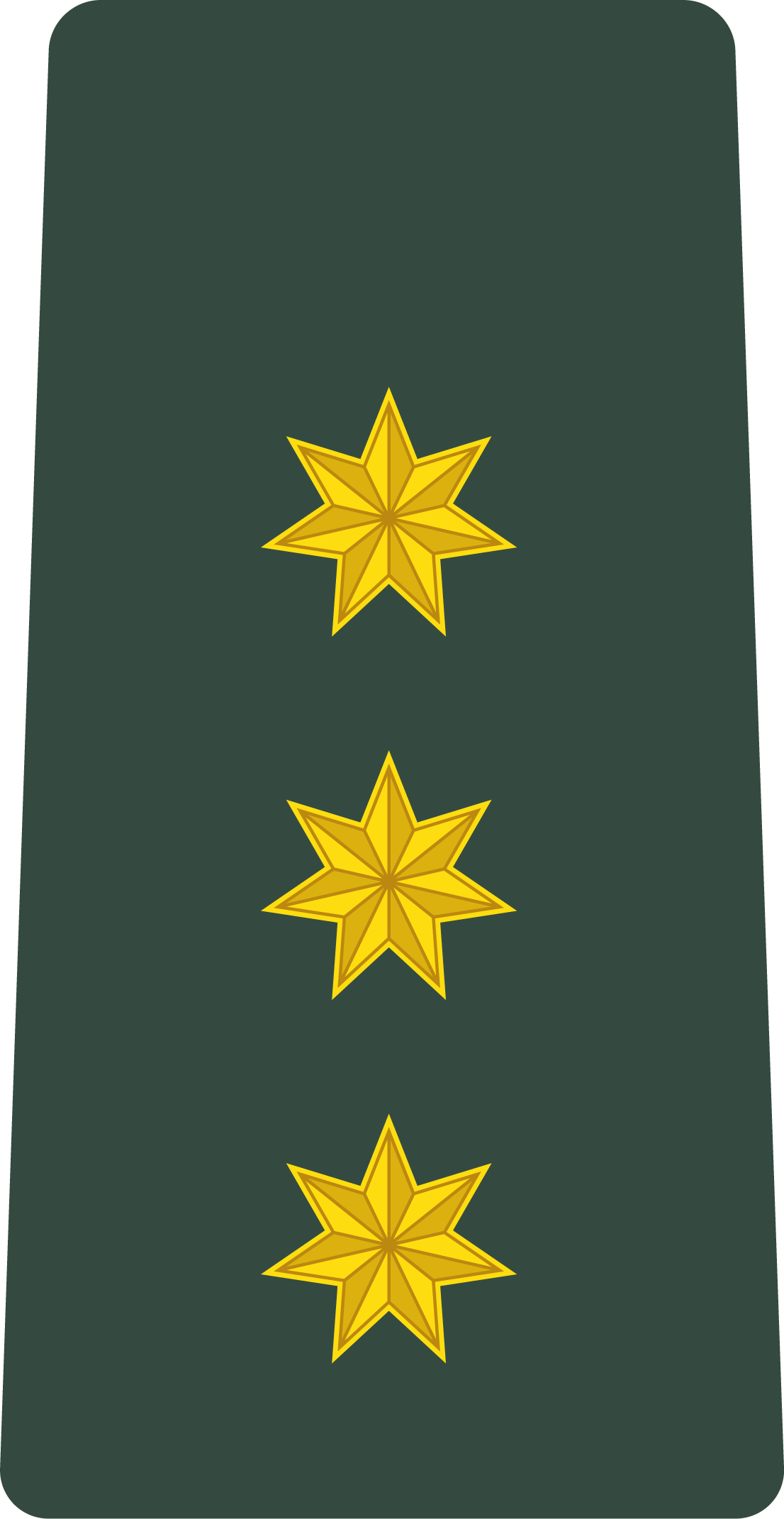
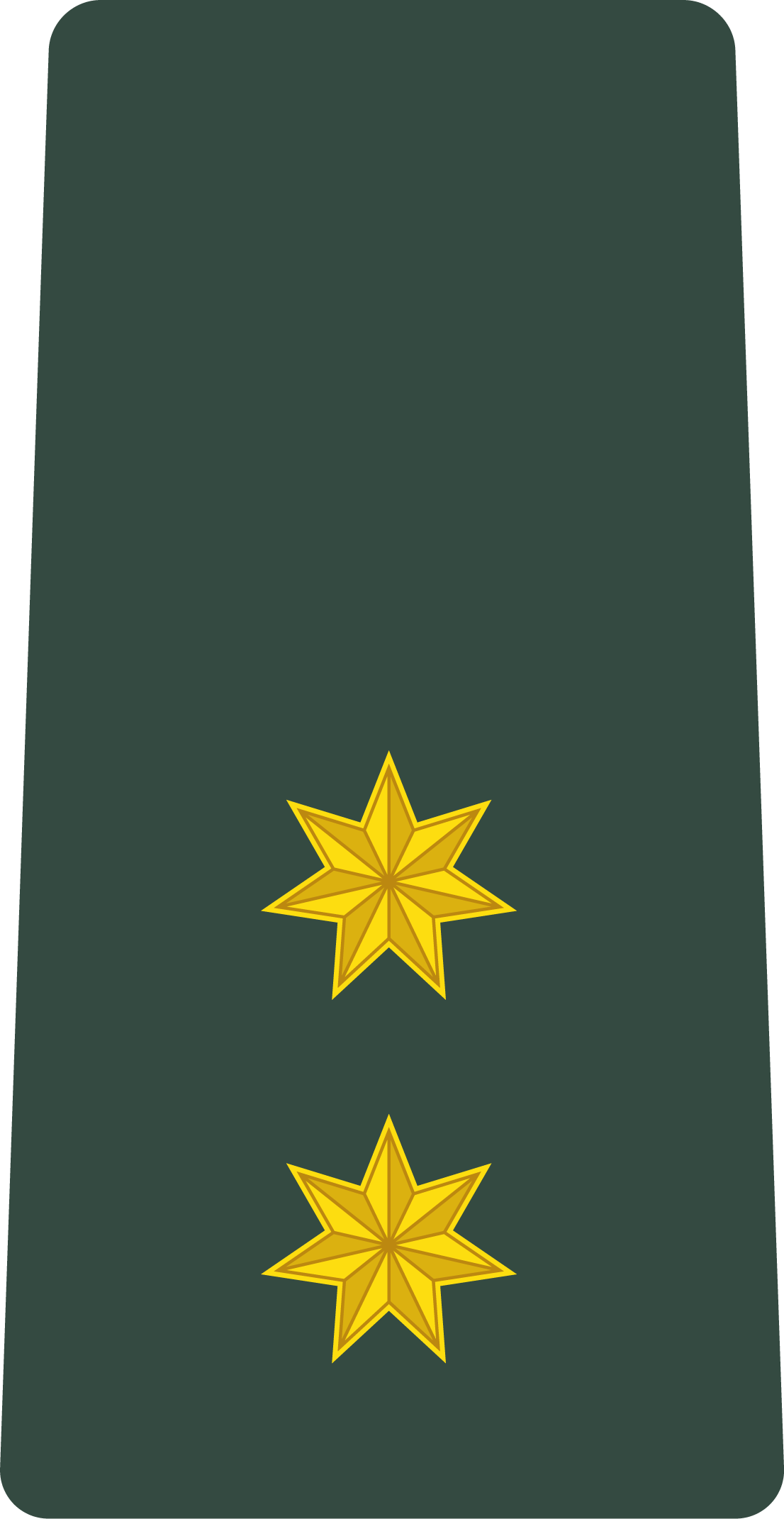
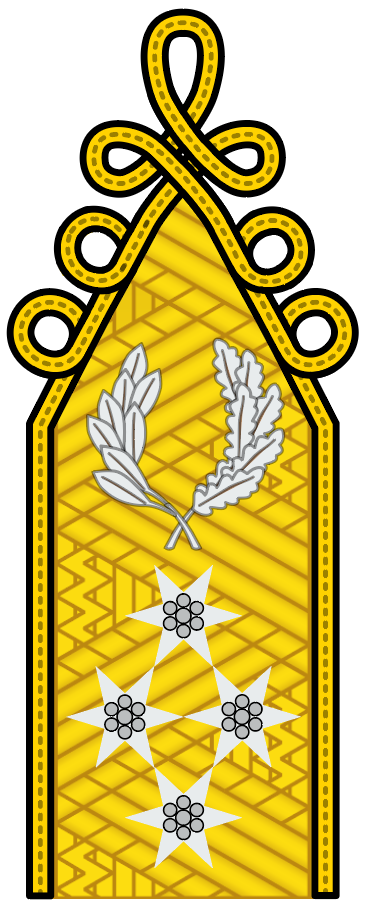
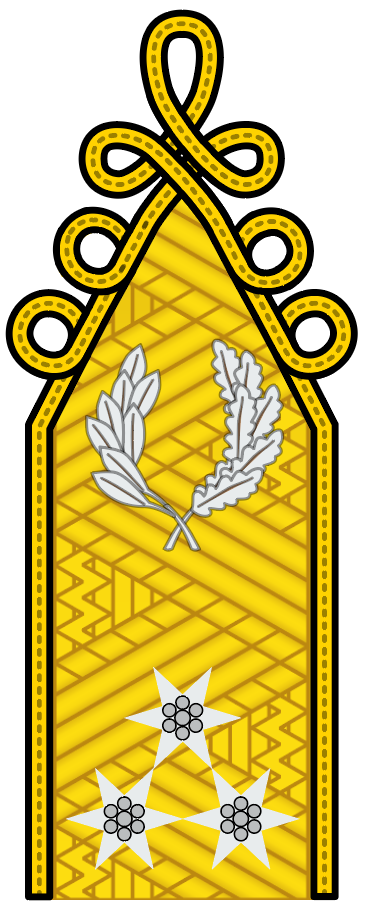
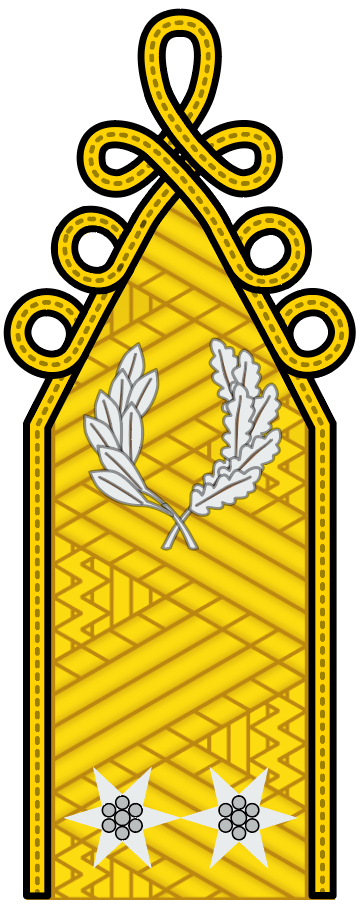
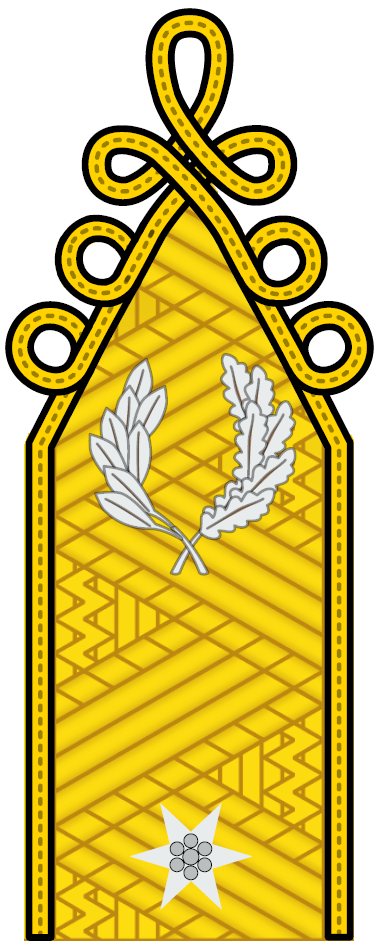
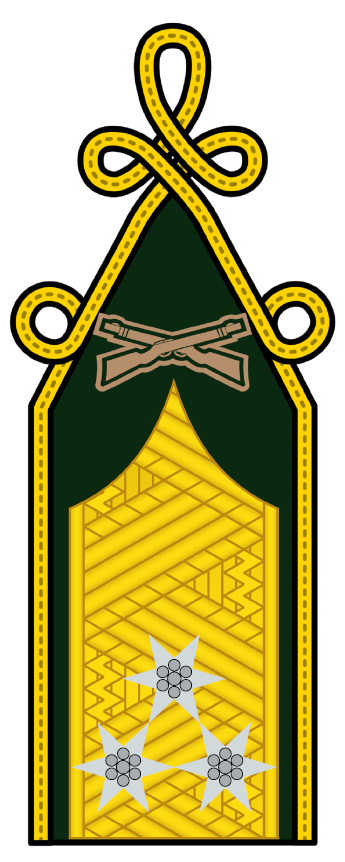
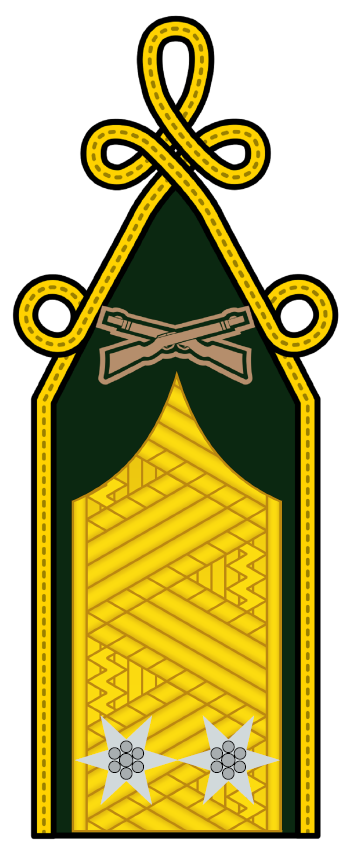
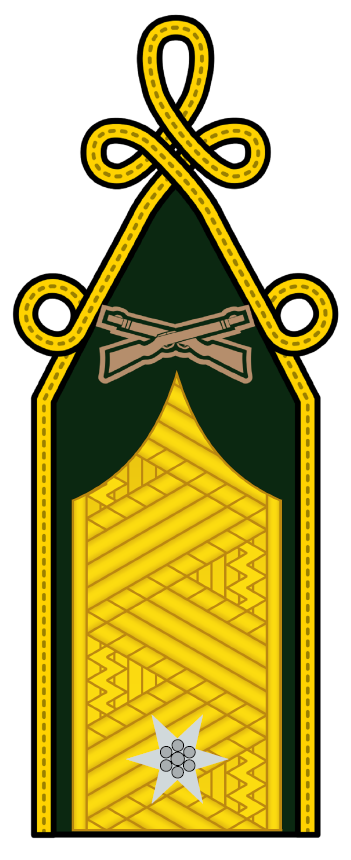
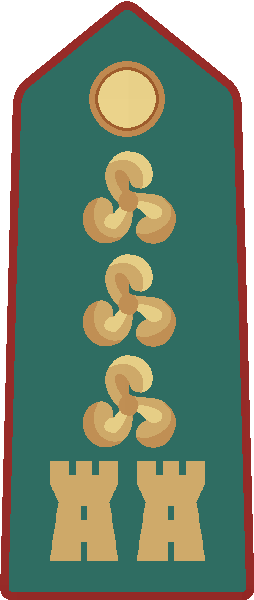
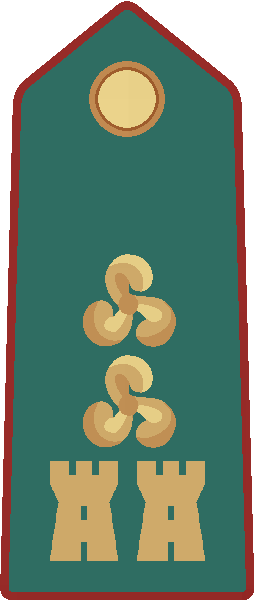
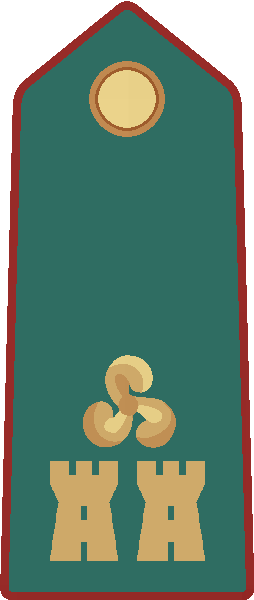
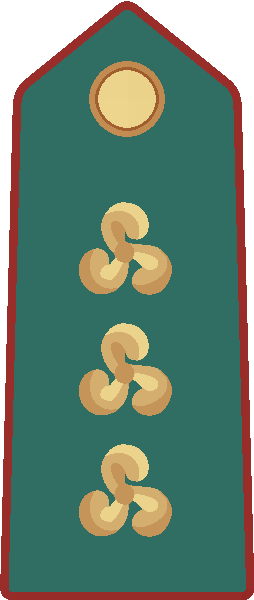
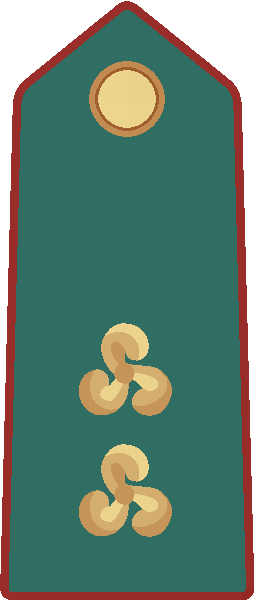
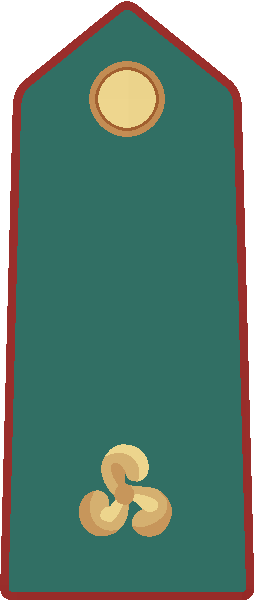
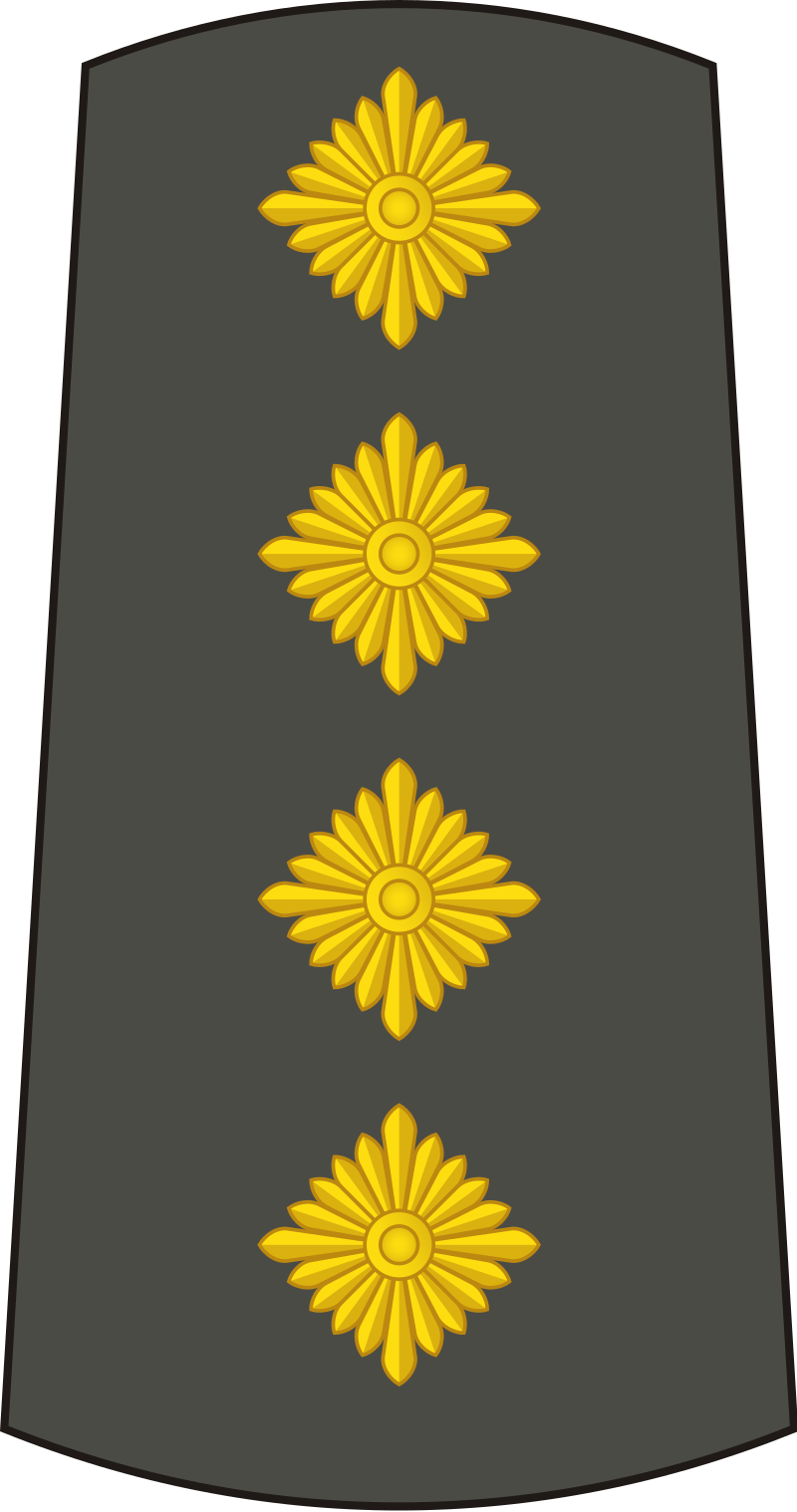
Rank group	General / flag officers					Senior officers					Junior officers
Albanian Land Force
Albanian Land Force			Gjeneral lejtant	Gjeneral major	Gjeneral brigade	Kolonel		Nënkolonel	Major		Kapiten		Toger		Nëntoger
Austrian Land Forces
Austrian Land Forces		General	Generalleutnant	Generalmajor	Brigadier	Oberst		Oberstleutnant	Major		Hauptmann		Oberleutnant		Leutnant
Belarusian Ground Forces
Belarusian Ground Forces	Верховный главнокомандующий Verkhovnyy glavnokomanduyushchiy		Ґенэрал-палкоўнік; G̀jeneral-palkoŭnik	Ґенэрал-лейтэнант; G̀jeneral-liejtenant	Ґенэрал-маёр; G̀jeneral-major	Палкоўнік; Palkoŭnik		Падпалкоўнік; Padpalkoŭnik	Маёр; Major		Капітан; Kapitan		Старшы лейтэнант Staršy liejtenant	Лейтэнант; Liejtenant	Малодшы лейтэнант Malodšy liejtenant
Belgian Land Component
Belgian Land Component		Generaal	Luitenant-generaal	Generaal-majoor	Brigadegeneraal	Kolonel		Luitenant-kolonel	Majoor	Kapitein-commandant	Kapitein		Luitenant		Onderluitenant
Belgian Land Component		Général	Lieutenant général	Général-major	Général de Brigade	Colonel		Lieutenant-colonel	Major	Capitaine-commandant	Capitaine		Lieutenant		Sous-lieutenant
Belgian Land Component		General	Generalleutnant	Generalmajor	Brigadegeneral	Oberst		Oberstleutnant	Major	Stabshauptmann	Hauptmann		Leutnant		Unterleutnant
Bosnian Ground Forces
Bosnian Ground Forces			General pukovnik	General major	Brigadni general	Brigadir		Pukovnik	Major		Kapetan		Poručnik		Podporučnik
Bulgarian Land Forces
Bulgarian Land Forces		Генерал; General	Генерал-лейтенант; General-leytenant	Генерал-майор; General-mayor	Бригаден генерал Brigaden general	Полковник; Polkovnik		Подполковник; Podpolkovnik	Майор; Mayor		Капитан; Kapitan		Старши лейтенант Starshi leytenant		Лейтенант; Leytenant
Croatian Army
Croatian Army	Stožerni general	General zbora	General pukovnik	General bojnik	Brigadni general	Brigadir		Pukovnik	Bojnik		Satnik		Natporučnik		Poručnik
Cypriot Ground Forces
Cypriot Ground Forces			Αντιστράτηγος; Antistratigos	Υποστράτηγος; Ypostratigos	Ταξίαρχος; Taxiarchos	Συνταγματάρχης; Syntagmatarchis		Αντισυνταγματάρχης; Antisyntagmatarchis	Ταγματάρχης; Tagmatarchis		Λοχαγός; Lochagos		Υπολοχαγός; Ypolochagos		Ανθυπολοχαγός; Anthypolochagos
Northern Cypriot; Security Forces Command
Northern Cypriot; Security Forces Command				Tümgeneral	Tuğgeneral	Albay		Yarbay	Binbaşı		Yüzbaşı		Üsteğmen	Teğmen	Asteğmen
Czech Land Forces
Czech Land Forces		Armádní generál	Generálporučík	Generálmajor	Brigádní generál	Plukovník		Podplukovník	Major		Kapitán		Nadporučík		Poručík
Royal Danish Army
Royal Danish Army		General	Generalløjtnant	Generalmajor	Brigadegeneral	Oberst		Oberstløjtnant	Major		Kaptajn		Premierløjtnant	Løjtnant	Sekondløjtnant
Estonian Land Forces
Estonian Land Forces		Kindral	Kindralleitnant	Kindralmajor	Brigaadikindral	Kolonel		Kolonelleitnant	Major		Kapten		Leitnant	Nooremleitnant	Lipnik
Finnish Army
Finnish Army		Kenraali	Kenraaliluutnantti	Kenraalimajuri	Prikaatikenraali	Eversti		Everstiluutnantti	Majuri		Kapteeni		Yliluutnantti	Luutnantti	Vänrikki
Finnish Army		General	Generallöjtnant	Generalmajor	Brigadgeneral	Överste		Överstelöjtnant	Major		Kapten		Premiärlöjtnant	Löjtnant	Fänrik
French Army
French Army	Maréchal de France	Général d'armée	Général de corps d'armée	Général de division	Général de brigade	Colonel		Lieutenant-colonel	Commandant		Capitaine		Lieutenant		Sous-lieutenant
Georgian Land Forces
Georgian Land Forces		არმიის გენერალი Armiis generali	გენერალ ლეიტენანტი General leit’enant’i	გენერალ-მაიორი General-maiori	ბრიგადის გენერალი Brigadis generali	პოლკოვნიკი P’olk’ovnik’i		ვიცე-პოლკოვნიკი Vitse-p’olk’ovnik’i	მაიორი Maiori		კაპიტანი K’ap’it’ani		უფროსი ლეიტენანტი Uprosi leit’enant’i		ლეიტენანტი Leit’enant’i
German Army
German Army		General	Generalleutnant	Generalmajor	Brigadegeneral	Oberst		Oberstleutnant	Major		Stabshauptmann	Hauptmann	Oberleutnant		Leutnant
Hellenic Army
Hellenic Army		Στρατηγός; Stratigos	Αντιστράτηγος; Antistratigos	Υποστράτηγος; Ypostratigos	Ταξίαρχος; Taxiarchos	Συνταγματάρχης; Syntagmatarchis		Αντισυνταγματάρχης; Antisyntagmatarchis	Ταγματάρχης; Tagmatarchis		Λοχαγός; Lochagos		Υπολοχαγός; Ypolochagos		Ανθυπολοχαγός; Anthypolochagos
Rank group	General / flag officers					Senior officers					Junior officers
Hungarian Ground Forces
Hungarian Ground Forces		Vezérezredes	Altábornagy	Vezérőrnagy	Dandártábornok	Ezredes		Alezredes	Őrnagy		Százados		Főhadnagy		Hadnagy
Iceland Crisis Response Unit
Iceland Crisis Response Unit						Ofursti		Undirofursti	Majór		Höfuðsmaður		Liðsforingi		Undirliðsforingi
Irish Army
Irish Army			Lieutenant-general	Major-general	Brigadier-general	Colonel		Lieutenant-colonel	Commandant		Captain		Lieutenant		Second-Lieutenant
Irish Army			Lefteanant-ghinearál	Maor-ghinearál	Briogáidire-ghinearál	Cornal		Lefteanant-chornal	Ceannfort		Captaen		Lefteanant		Dara-lefteanant
Italian Army
Italian Army		Generale	Generale di Corpo d'Armata (Tenente Generale)	Generale di Divisione (Maggior Generale)	Generale di Brigata (Brigadier Generale)	Colonnello		Tenente Colonnello	Maggiore		Primo capitano	Capitano	Tenente		Sottotenente
Kosovo Security Force
Kosovo Security Force			Gjenerallejtnant	Gjeneralmajor	Gjeneralbrigade	Kolonel		Nënkolonel	Major		Kapiten		Toger		Nëntoger
Latvian Land Forces
Latvian Land Forces			Ģenerālleitnants	Ģenerālmajors	Brigādes ģenerālis	Pulkvedis		Pulkvežleitnants	Majors		Kapteinis		Virsleitnants		Leitnants
Liechtenstein	No army
Lithuanian Land Force
Lithuanian Land Force		Generolas	Generolas leitenantas	Generolas majoras	Brigados generolas	Pulkininkas		Pulkininkas leitenantas	Majoras		Kapitonas		Vyresnysis leitenantas		Leitenantas
Luxembourg Army
Luxembourg Army					Général	Colonel		Lieutenant-colonel	Major		Capitaine		Lieutenant en premier		Lieutenant
North Macedonia Ground Forces
North Macedonia Ground Forces		Генерал; General	Генерал-потполковник; General-potpolkovnik	Генерал-мајор; General-major	Бригаден генерал Brigaden general	Полковник; Polkovnik		Потполковник; Potpolkovnik	Мајор; Major		Капетан; Kapetan		Поручник; Poručnik		Потпоручник; Potporučnik
Army of Malta
Army of Malta					Brigadier; Brigadier	Colonel; Kurunell		Lieutenant colonel Logutenent kurunell	Major; Maġġur		Captain; Kaptan		Lieutenant; Logutenent		Second lieutenant Sekond logutenent
Moldovan Ground Forces
Moldovan Ground Forces			General de corp de armată	General de divizie	General de brigadă	Colonel		Locotenent-colonel	Maior		Căpitan		Locotenent-major		Locotenent
Army of Monaco
Army of Monaco	Général en chef des armées					Colonel		Lieutenant-colonel	Commandant		Capitaine		Lieutenant		Sous-Lieutenant
Montenegrin Ground Army
Montenegrin Ground Army		General pukovnik	General potpukovnik	General major	Brigadir general	Pukovnik		Potpukovnik	Major		Kapetan		Poručnik		Potporučnik
Royal Netherlands Army
Royal Netherlands Army		Generaal	Luitenant-generaal	Generaal-majoor	Brigadegeneraal	Kolonel		Luitenant-kolonel	Majoor		Kapitein/ Ritmeester		Eerste luitenant		Tweede luitenant
Norwegian Army
Norwegian Army		General	Generalløytnant	Generalmajor	Brigader	Oberst		Oberstløytnant	Major		Kaptein/ Rittmester		Løytnant		Fenrik
Polish Land Forces
Polish Land Forces	Marszałek Polski	Generał	Generał broni	Generał dywizji	Generał brygady	Pułkownik		Podpułkownik	Major		Kapitan		Porucznik		Podporucznik
Rank group	General / flag officers					Senior officers					Junior officers
Portuguese Army
Portuguese Army	Marechal do Exército	General	Tenente-general	Major-general	Brigadeiro-general	Coronel-tirocinado (Note: Colonel who has completed the General Officer training course. Between 1929 and 1937, the Coronel-tirocinado was called Brigadeiro.)	Coronel	Tenente-coronel	Major		Capitão		Tenente		Alferes
Romanian Land Forces
Romanian Land Forces	Mareșal	General	General-locotenent	General-maior	General de brigadă	Colonel		Locotenent-colonel	Maior		Căpitan		Locotenent		Sublocotenent
Russian Ground Forces
Russian Ground Forces	Маршал Российской Федерации; Marshal Rossiyskoy Federatsii	Генерал армии General armii	Генерал-полковник; General-polkovnik	Генерал-лейтенант; General-leytenant	Генерал-майор; General-mayor	Полковник; Polkovnik		Подполковник; Podpolkovnik	Майор; Mayor		Kапитан; Kapitan		Старший лейтенант Starshiy leytenant	Лейтенант; Leytenant	Mладший лейтенант Mladshiy leytenant
Sammarinese Guard of the Rock
Sammarinese Guard of the Rock						Colonnello		Tenente Colonnello	Maggiore		Capitano		Tenente		Sottotenente
Serbian Army
Serbian Army		Генерал; General	Генерал-потпуковник; General-potpukovnik	Генерал-мајор; General-major	Бригадни генерал Brigadni general	Пуковник; Pukovnik		Потпуковник; Potpukovnik	Мајор; Major		Капетан прве класе Kapetan prve klase	Капетан; Kapetan	Поручник; Poručnik		Потпоручник; Potporučnik
Slovak Ground Forces
Slovak Ground Forces		Generál	Generálporučík (Note: The appropriate branch of service badge is pinned just under the top button of the for all ranks excluding full General.)	Generálmajor	Brigádny generál	Plukovník		Podplukovník	Major		Kapitán		Nadporučík		Poručík
Slovenian Ground Force
Slovenian Ground Force		General	Generalpodpolkovnik	Generalmajor	Brigadir	Polkovnik		Podpolkovnik	Major		Stotnik		Nadporočnik		Poročnik
Spanish Army
Spanish Army	Capitán general	General de ejército	Teniente general	General de división	General de brigada	Coronel		Teniente coronel	Comandante		Capitán		Teniente		Alférez
Swedish Army
Swedish Army		General	Generallöjtnant	Generalmajor	Brigadgeneral	Överste		Överstelöjtnant	Major		Kapten		Löjtnant		Fänrik
Swiss Army		General[1]	Corps General	Division General	Brigade General	Colonel		Lieutenant Colonel	Major		Captain		First Lieutenant		Lieutenant
Swiss Army		General	Korpskommandant	Divisionär	Brigadier	Oberst		Oberstleutnant	Major		Hauptmann		Oberleutnant		Leutnant
Swiss Army		Général	Commandant de corps	Divisionnaire	Brigadier	Colonel		Lieutenant-colonel	Major		Capitaine		Premier-lieutenant		Lieutenant
Turkish Land Forces
Turkish Land Forces	Mareşal	Orgeneral	Korgeneral	Tümgeneral	Tuğgeneral	Albay		Yarbay	Binbaşı		Yüzbaşı		Üsteğmen	Teğmen	Asteğmen
Ukrainian Ground Forces
Ukrainian Ground Forces		Генерал; Heneral	Генерал-лейтенант; Heneral-leitenant	Генерал-майор; Heneral-maior	Бригадний генерал Bryhadnyi heneral	Полковник; Polkovnyk		Підполковник; Pidpolkovnyk	Майор; Maior		Капітан; Kapitan		Старший лейтенант Starshyi leitenant	Лейтенант; Leitenant	Молодший лейтенант Molodshyi leitenant
British Army
British Army	Field marshal	General	Lieutenant-general	Major-general	Brigadier	Colonel		Lieutenant colonel	Major		Captain		Lieutenant		Second lieutenant
Pontifical Swiss Guard
Pontifical Swiss Guard						Oberst		Oberstleutnant	Major		Hauptmann		Leutnant
Rank group	General / flag officers					Senior officers					Junior officers

Remark:
NATO STANAG 2116 lists Officer Designates (listed here as OF(D)) of some countries alongside OF-1 ranks.

== See also ==
- Comparative army enlisted ranks of Europe
- Military rank
- Comparative army officer ranks of the Americas
- Comparative army officer ranks of Asia
- Ranks and insignia of NATO armies officers
