= Hypsipyle (play) =

Fragmentary tragedy by Euripides

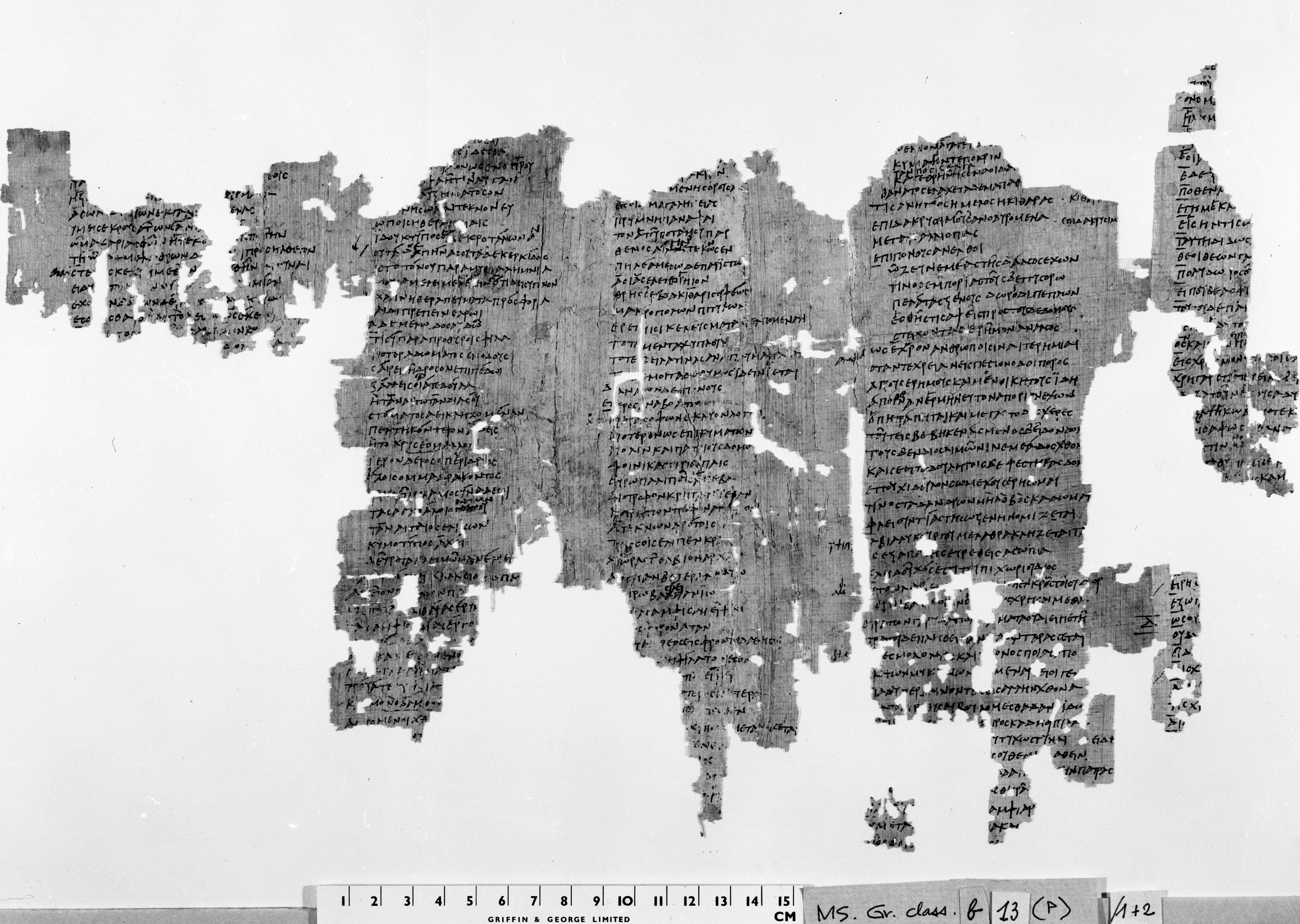
- Oxyrhynchus Papyrus 852
- Written by: Euripides
- Characters: Hypsipyle; Amphiaraus; Eurydice; Thoas; Euneus
- Original language: Ancient Greek
- Genre: Tragedy
- Setting: Nemea

Premiere
- Date premiered: 411–407 BC
- Place premiered: Athens

Hypsipyle (Ancient Greek: Ὑψιπύλη) is a partially preserved tragedy by Euripides, about the legend of queen Hypsipyle of Lemnos, daughter of King Thoas. It was one of his last and most elaborate plays. It was performed c. 411–407, along with The Phoenician Women which survives in full, and the fragmentary Antiope.

Originally only known from a few fragments, knowledge of the play was greatly expanded with the discovery of Oxyrhynchus Papyrus 852 in 1905, and its publication by Grenfell and Hunt in 1908. Of his lost plays, it is the one with the most extensive fragments. The prologue referenced Dionysus leading a dance along Mount Parnassus.

== Plot ==
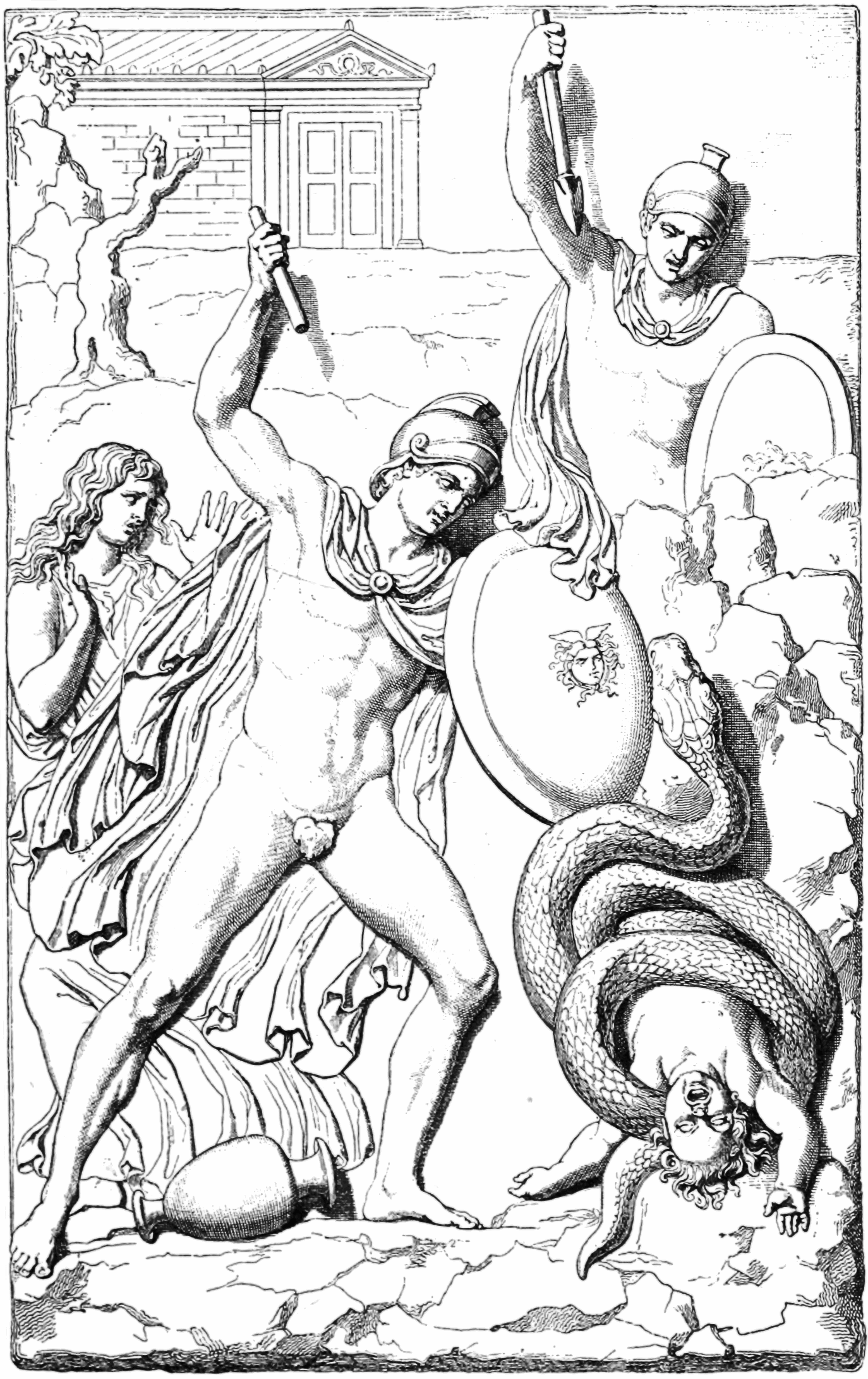
The death of Opheltes.

The heroine of Euripides' play is Hypsipyle, the former queen of Lemnos, and lover of Jason. When the women of Lemnos killed all the men on the island, Hypsipyle had refused to kill her father Thoas, the king, and instead secretly helped him flee the island. She ruled Lemnos when Jason and the Argonauts visited the island, and she had, by Jason, twin sons Thoas and Euneus. Later, when the Lemnian women discovered Hypsipyle's deception, she fled the island, but was captured by pirates, and sold as a slave to Lycurgus, the priest of Zeus at Nemea. Hypsipyle has come to be the nursemaid of Opheltes, the infant son of Lycurgus, and his wife Eurydice.

As the action of the play begins, Hypsipyle's twin sons by Jason, Euneus and Thoas, arrive seeking shelter for the night. The sons have been separated from Hypsipyle since infancy, so neither recognizes the other. When Jason left Lemnos he had taken his sons to Colchis. After he died, Jason's fellow argonaut Orpheus took the boys to Thrace, where he raised them. They eventually met Hypsipyles' father Thoas, who took them back to Lemnos. From there they embarked on a search for their mother.

The Seven against Thebes have also just arrived and encounter Hypsipyle. Amphiaraus tells Hypsipyle that they need water for a sacrifice, and she leads the Seven to a spring. Hypsipyle brings Opheltes with her, and somehow, in a moment of neglect, Opheltes is killed by a serpent. The child's mother Eurydice is about to have Hypsipyle put to death, when Amphiaraus arrives and Hypsipyle pleads with him to speak in her defense. Amphiaraus tells Eurydice that the child's death was destined, proposes that funeral games be held in Opheltes' honor, and is able to convince Eurydice to spare Hypsipyle's life. Funeral games are held, and Hypsypyle's sons participate, as a result of which, a recognition and reunion between Hypsipyle and her sons is effected, who then manage to free Hypsipyle from her servitude.

The surviving fragments of Euripides' play do not make it clear how the recognition between Hypsipyle and her sons was brought about, but two later accounts may have been based on the play. According to the Second Vatican Mythographer, after the sons won the foot-race, at the funeral games, their names and parents were announced, and in this way their identities were revealed. The Cyzicene epigrams, the third book of the Palatine Anthology, describes a depiction, on a temple in Cyzicus, of Euneus and Thoas showing Hypsipyle a gold ornament ("the golden vine") as proof of their identities.
