= Thebaid (Statius) =

Latin poem by Statius

- by Statius
- 1786 oil painting by Henry Fuseli depicting the curse of Oedipus
- Written: 80–90 AD
- Language: Latin
- Genre: Epic poetry
- Meter: Dactylic hexameter
- Lines: 9748

The Thebaid (/ˈθiːbeɪ.ɪd/; Latin: Thēbaïs, lit. 'Song of Thebes') is a Latin epic poem written by the Roman poet Statius. Published in the early 90s AD, it contains 9,748 lines arranged in 12 books, and recounts the clash of two brothers, Eteocles and Polynices, over the throne of the Greek city of Thebes. After Polynices is sent into exile, he forges an alliance of seven Greek princes and embarks on a military campaign against his brother.

Although its source material derives predominantly from the Greek literary tradition, the Thebaid has close ties with other Latin texts such as Virgil's Aeneid and the tragedies of Seneca the Younger. The poem's central themes include the relationship between politics and the family, civil war, and the amoral acts to which it gives rise. Critics have also noted the poem's innovative depiction of Roman mythology. Following in the footsteps of Ovid's Metamorphoses, Statius used an episodic structure which is held together by subtle links between individual episodes.

The Thebaid was not widely read in antiquity, but was held in high esteem throughout the Middle Ages, when multiple adaptions of the poem were composed in vernacular languages. Preserved through the Carolingian Renaissance, the text of the Thebaid reached modernity without the recognition it once held. While classical scholars of the 19th and early 20th century criticised the poem for a perceived lack of originality and taste, a resurgence of critical interest has since brought it closer to the centre of the literary canon.

== Synopsis ==
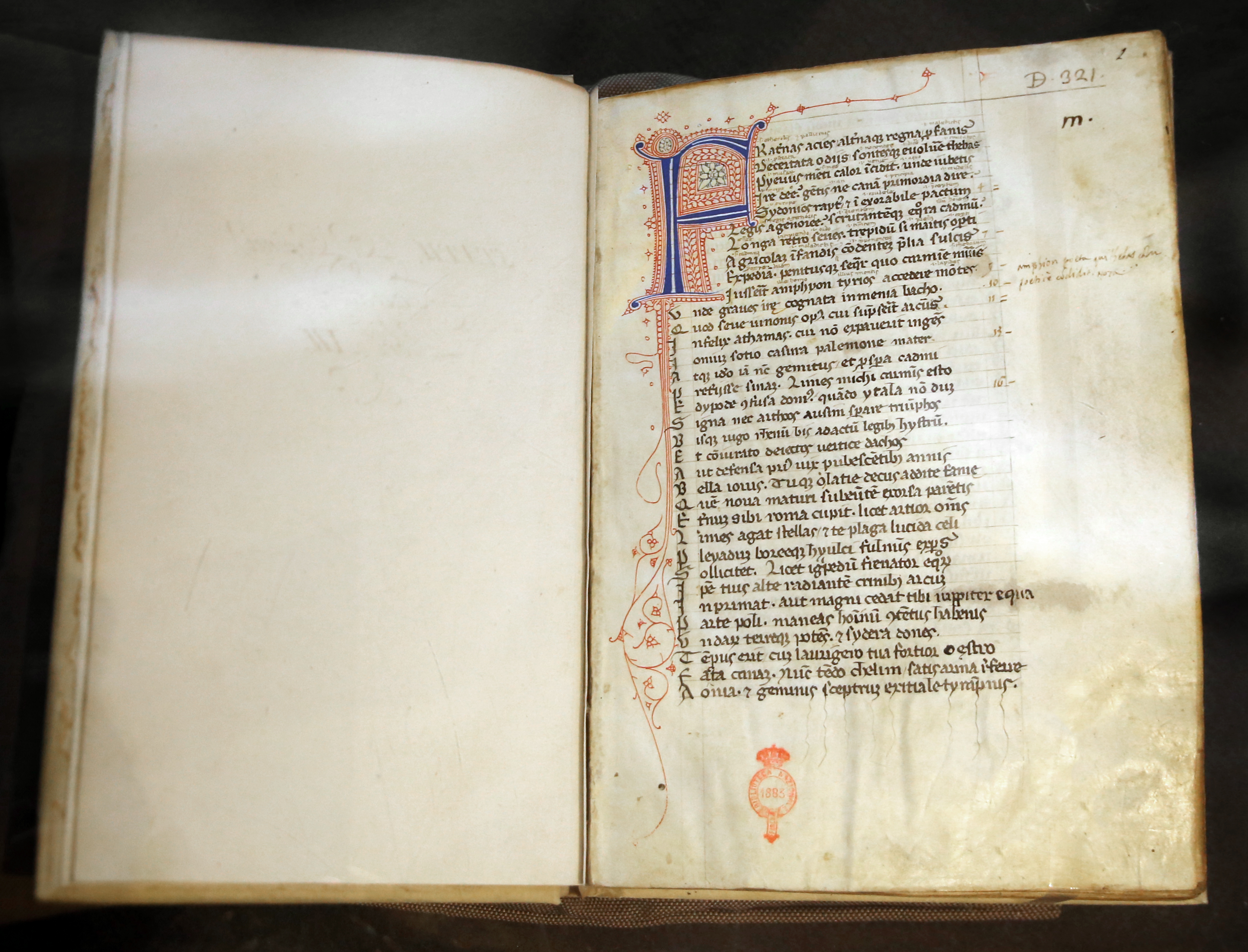
14th-century manuscript of the Thebaid from Italy

=== Preparations for war ===
Book 1: The Thebaid begins with a view of Oedipus, the former king of Thebes, who has gouged out his eyes and relinquished his kingdom after learning that he had killed his father Laius and committed incest with his mother Jocasta. He places a curse on his sons, Eteocles and Polynices, who had turned on him because of his transgressions. The fury Tisiphone is sent to Thebes in order to sow discord among the brothers. In the city, Eteocles and Polynices strike a pact, stipulating that rule of the city would alternate between them on an annual basis while the other spent a year in exile. Eteocles is granted the first term as king.

A council of the gods takes place, at which Jupiter decides that he will involve the cities of Thebes and Argos in a war against each other. Following the agreement with his brother, Polynices is exiled and wanders through Greece. In the midst of a violent storm, he seeks refuge at the palace of Adrastus, king of Argos. At the palace's threshold, he gets into a heated argument with Tydeus, an exiled prince from Calydon. Their fight is broken up by Adrastus who invites them into his palace.

At a feast in honour of the god Apollo, Adrastus suggests that the two exiles marry his young daughters. He also explains that the feast commemorates a legend from his city's history: After Apollo defeated the serpent Python, he went to King Crotopus of Argos to purify himself. There he fell in love with the king's daughter (nameless in the Thebaid, but called Psamathe by Callimachus) and impregnated the girl. She kept her pregnancy secret in fear of her father’s reaction and gave birth to a son (Linus according to other sources, but unnamed in the Thebaid), whom she entrusted to a herdsman to be raised. In an unguarded moment, wild dogs devoured the infant. Hearing this, the princess confessed her plight to her father who punished her by death. Apollo then created a child-devouring monster and sent it to punish the people of the kingdom. The young hero Coroebus, not wanting the disaster to continue, killed the monster. Even more angered by this, Apollo sent a plague onto Argos. Seeing this Coroebus went to the god’s newly erected sanctuary in Delphi and confronted him, expressing his will to offer his own life to save his hometown from the god’s wrath. Moved by this, the god decided to spare both Coroebus and his city. Thereafter, the Argives annually celebrated a festival in Apollo's honor.

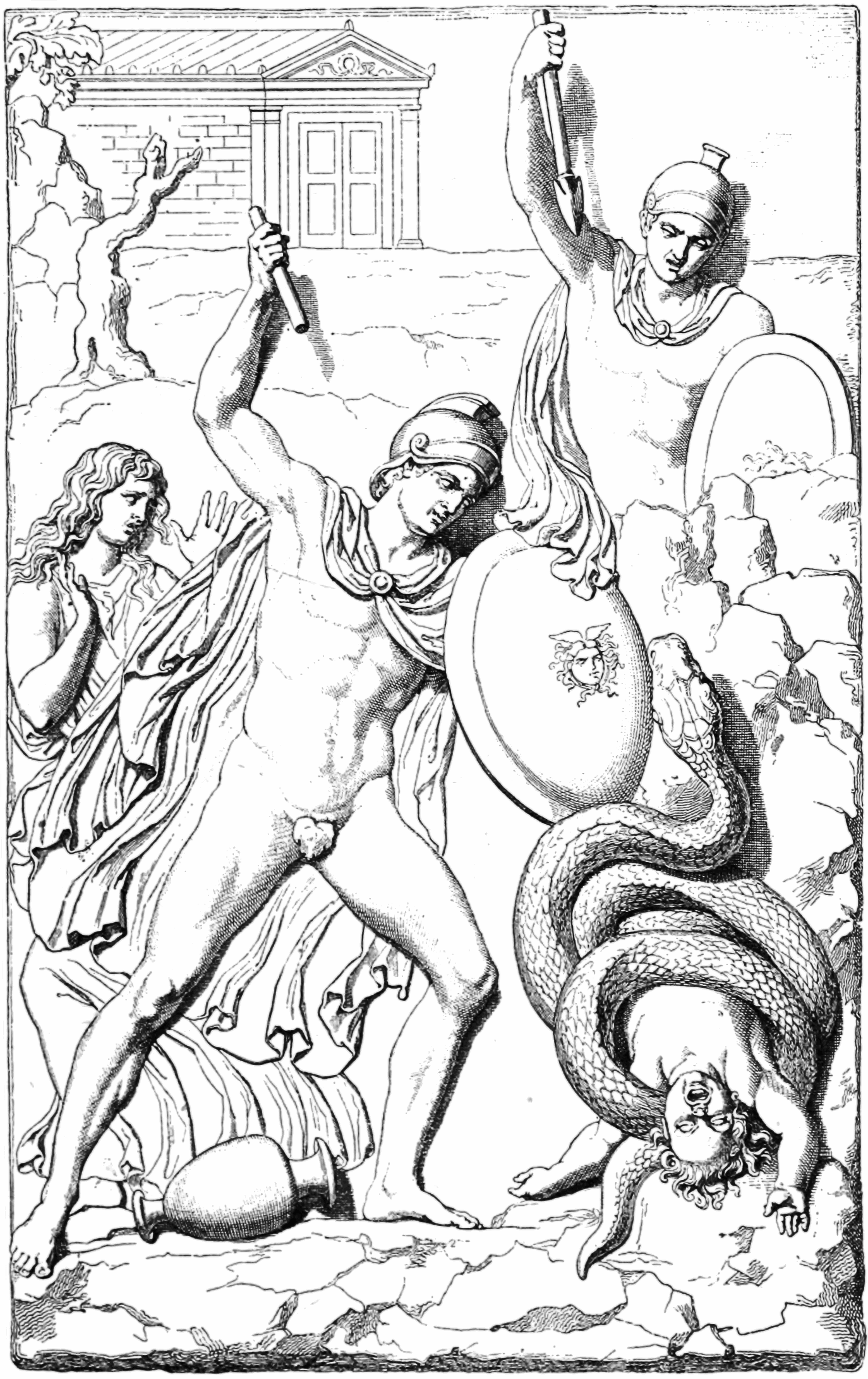
Opheltes is ensnared by the serpent of Jupiter, sketch of a 2nd-century relief

Book 2: Argia and Deipyle, Adrastus' daughters, marry Polynices and Tydeus respectively. Their father thus concludes a military alliance with his sons-in-law. The wedding ceremony is marred by ill omens caused by Argia's wearing of the Necklace of Harmonia, a cursed object first worn by Harmonia, the wife of Thebes' mythical founder Cadmus. Polynices dreams of recovering his throne and asks his new allies for their support. Short of going to war, Tydeus is sent on an embassy to Thebes.

Eteocles is visited by the ghost of his grandfather Laius who warns him about his brother's intentions. Thus instructed, he rejects the Argive embassy and sends a group of 50 warriors to ambush Tydeus on his way home; in the ensuing battle, Tydeus single-handedly kills all but one Theban soldier. Maeon, the only survivor, returns to the palace.

Book 3: Maeon accuses Eteocles of causing the death of dozens of Thebans. He kills himself in anticipation of the king's punishment.

Jupiter instructs Mars to incite the citizens of Argos to war. Upon Tydeus' arrival, Adrastus remains reluctant to go to war against Thebes. After several days, he bows to his allies' pressure and lets his seers Amphiaraus and Melampus find out whether a war is sanctioned by the gods.

Book 4: Though the omens presage a terrible defeat, it is decided that Argos should march against Thebes. Both sides begin to prepare for war. At Argos, seven princes assemble their forces: Polynices, Adrastus, Tydeus, Amphiaraus, Capaneus, Hippomedon, and Parthenopaeus. At Thebes, panic breaks out at the news that an Argive army is preparing. Eteocles orders the seer Tiresias to consult the gods. In a necromantic ritual, he predicts a horrific war with a good outcome for Thebes.

=== Nemea ===
As the Argives pass through Nemea on their way to Thebes, they are spotted by the god Bacchus who harbours sympathies for the Thebans. To prevent the army's arrival, he withdraws all water from the area. The Argives are struck by a parching thirst but they are saved by a young woman named Hypsipyle who shows them the way to a nearby stream. After they drink from the muddy river, Hypsipyle reveals that she is the daughter of Thoas, the former king of the island of Lemnos.

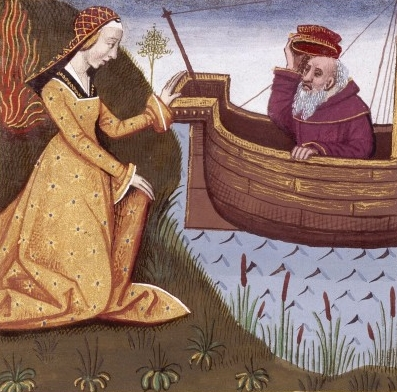
Hypsipyle saves her father Thoas, detail of a manuscript housed in the Bibliothèque nationale de France

Book 5: In a narrative taking up the fifth book almost in its entirety, the princess Hypsipyle tells the story of how she came to Nemea: the women of Lemnos had disrespected the goddess Venus who, in return, had inspired their husbands to embark on a military campaign against Thrace. In the men's absence, the women had fallen into a frenzy and conspired to kill all male children on the island. When the Lemnian men returned, they too were murdered by their wives. Only Hypsipyle was unaffected by the women's condition and had guided her father Thoas to safety in a chest. She then became queen of Lemnos.

After a while, the Argonauts had passed by Lemnos on their way back from Colchis. Although the women had tried to prevent them from disembarking, the Argonauts had invaded the island and, in a mass rape, fathered a new population of Lemnians. Hypsipyle was raped by their leader, Jason, and gave birth to two sons. In spite of their offspring, the Argonauts decided to leave the island. When rumour of Thoas' survival reached the island, Hypsipyle was forced to flee. Apprehended by pirates, the princess had been sold to Lycurgus, king of Nemea who made her a nurse to his infant son Opheltes.

While Hypsipyle is talking to the Argives, Opheltes is sleeping unwatched. A large serpent sacred to Jupiter grazes the child with its scales and kills him. The Argive princes attack the serpent in order to avenge the child's death; Capaneus succeeds in killing it and thereby incurs the enmity of Jupiter. Opheltes' parents, Lycurgus and his wife Eurydice, accuse Hypsipyle of neglecting their son. Keen to protect their saviour, the Argives initiate a commotion at Lycurgus' palace, from which Hypsipyle is saved by her sons Thoas and Euneus who had arrived in search of their lost mother.

Book 6: The next day, the Argive princes congregate at the palace to attend the funeral of Opheltes. An ancient grove is felled to provide the building material for a sumptuous pyre. After the child's body is cremated, they erect a temple to mark the spot. Following a common epic tradition, the Argives suggest the inauguration of funerary games in honour of the dead boy. The games are contested by the Argive army and act as an origin myth of the Nemean Games which were celebrated in antiquity.

=== War at Thebes ===
Book 7: Angry at the Nemean delay, Jupiter sends Mars to incite the Argives to continue their march. Against the opposition of Bacchus, the Argive army makes its way to Thebes. Meanwhile, the Thebans muster their own army while Antigone, the warring brothers' sister, looks down from the city walls. In a narrative device known as teichoscopy, an old servant instructs her about all notable warriors involved in the Theban host.

In the night after the Argives arrive at Thebes, Jocasta visits their camp hoping to serve as a mediator between her sons. However, Tydeus turns her down and brusquely sends her back to the city. The Argives proceed to kill the tigers of Bacchus, a sacrilege over which their first confrontation with the Thebans breaks out. Amphiaraus, aided by his patron Apollo, kills dozens of enemies in a frenzy until a large chasm opens up and absorbs him into the underworld. He is the first of the seven princes to die.

Book 8: Disturbed by the news of his death, the Argives negotiate a brief truce. They spend the night mourning their loss while the Thebans celebrate a victory. On the morning of the next day, Thiodamas is appointed to replace the dead seer. Upon his accession, he conducts an elaborate ritual to the gods. Slaughter ensues on the second day of battle. Tydeus fights the Theban prince Haemon. Victorious, he goes on a rampage and kills swathes of Theban soldiers, among them Atys, the fiancé of Polynices' sister Ismene. When he sets his sights on Eteocles, Tydeus is intercepted by the Theban hero Melanippus, whom Tydeus slays, but not before receiving a mortal wound. Driven beyond sanity by hatred toward the man who fatally wounded him and the pain of dying, Tydeus cracks open Melanipus's skull and devours his brains.

Book 9: Both sides are horror-struck by Tydeus' horrific act and attempt to take possession of his body. Hippomedon fights against a whole host of Thebans to retain the corpse but is tricked by Tisiphone into abandoning the scene. He goes on to fight in the bed of the river Ismenus but makes the mistake of killing the river god's grandson Crenaeus. So provoked, the river joins the battle and drowns Hippomedon. Atalanta, Parthenopaeus' mother, has a vision of her son's death in a dream. The goddess Diana seeks to intervene on her behalf but is told by Apollo that the youth cannot be saved. Parthenopaeus is granted one last killing spree before he is killed by Dryas.

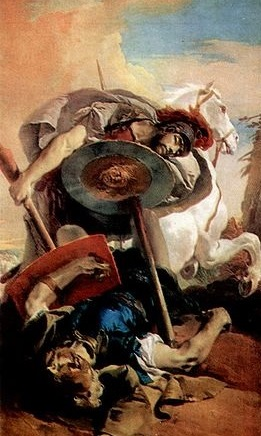
The duel of Eteocles and Polynices, 18th-century oil painting by Tiepolo

Book 10: At Argos, a group of women pray to Juno to come to their army's help. The goddess sends her messenger Iris to the cave of sleep where she ask Sleep himself to intervene. He obliges and casts deep sleep onto the Theban army. Led by Thiodamas, a band of Argives invades the Theban siege camp and commits a massacre. Two youths, Dymas and Hopleus, attempt to retrieve the bodies of Tydeus and Parthenopaeus. Apprehended by the Thebans, they die on top of the bodies they sought to steal.

The Argives now mount a full on assault on the fortress of Thebes. Within the city, Tiresias consults the gods and is given an omen: Menoeceus, the son of the leading Theban, Creon, and nephew of Jocasta, must be sacrificed to attain peace. The young man receives the omen happily, scales the walls of the city and kills himself in front of both armies. On the Argive side, Capaneus climbs the walls himself and, in an excess of hubris, vows to challenge Jupiter himself; the god, in turn, strikes him down with a thunderbolt.

Book 11: Tisiphone and her sister Megaera stir Polynices to challenge Eteocles to single combat to decide the war. Eteocles is hesitant but he is urged by Creon to accept the duel, while Antigone and Jocasta try to defuse the situation. Meeting on the plain before the city, the brothers fight and kill each other. Jocasta kills herself at the news. Creon succeeds Eteocles as king of Thebes as the rest of the Argive army departs.

=== Theseus' intervention ===
Book 12: In Thebes, Menoecus receives a kingly burial while the other war dead are cremated. Creon proclaims that he will deny burial to the dead Argives. The widows of the Argive army go on a mission to retrieve their husbands' bodies. When they learn of Creon's decree, they decide to split up: Polynices' widow Argia goes to Thebes, the other women to Athens in order to seek the protection of King Theseus.

Argia meets Antigone at the site of Polynices' body. After weeping over their shared loss, they burn his body on Eteocles' pyre. At Athens, the Argive women seek refuge at the Altar of Mercy. Having returned from an expedition against the Amazons, Theseus agrees to come to their aid. He directs his army towards Thebes where he routs the exhausted defenders and kills King Creon.

== Structure ==
Following the model of Vergil's Aeneid, the Thebaid is divided into 12 books, each containing between 720 and 946 lines in the dactylic hexameter. There is no universally recognised theory about the poem's internal structure, though the existing approaches can be summarised as follows: 1) two equal halves along the lines of the Aeneid, 2) four quarters of three books ("triads") based on sense breaks between individual books, and 3) four asymmetrical, thematic sections. In spite of this, three overarching sections are acknowledged by a majority of scholars:

- Books 1–4: build-up to the war, preparations at Argos and Thebes
- Books 5–6: the Argive army at Nemea, sometimes described as mora ("delay")
- Books 7–11: war at Thebes, deaths of the seven princes

== Themes ==
=== Politics ===
According to the classicist Kathleen Coleman, the Thebaid displays "a particularly Roman preoccupation with the relationship between politics and the family". The politics of Thebes are inextricably linked with those of its royal family: the rupture between Eteocles and Polynices results in a split within the Theban polity and leads ultimately to civil war. Another aspect of this theme is the dominance of male actors over their female contemporaries which mirrors the patriarchal society of Flavian Rome. Statius shares this concern with his epic predecessor Lucan, whose Bellum civile portrayed the civil war between Pompey and Caesar as failure of their marriage ties.

=== Moral and theological outlook ===
Statius' depiction of the gods marks a departure from the anthropomorphism exhibited by Homer and Vergil towards allegory. The writer C. S. Lewis considered his development of this narrative device an important predecessor of medieval forms of allegorical writing. Lewis illustrates this point with his analysis of the portrayal of Mars in the Thebaid: the god is always in a state of blind wrath and has come to represent the concept of warfare.

Another important theme is the poem's depiction of nefas. In the language of Roman moral discourse, the term denotes something or someone in violation of societal and religious norms. The Thebaid, classicist Randall Ganiban writes, is unique in Latin poetry for the degree to which its protagonists indulge in such behaviour without serious moral opposition. Although the poem's heroes commit acts of exceptional violence, they are not balanced by a benign cast of gods. Instead, the gods' attitude has been described as "one of hostility or indifference". The world of the Thebaid may thus be viewed as anti-Rome because it indulges in the unchecked representation of one of Rome's strictest religious taboos.

=== Episodicity ===
In contrast with other Roman epics (notably, the Aeneid), the poem does not follow a linear form of plot development. Instead, it entails a variety of loosely related episodes. This observation is most valid in the build-up to the war and has traditionally been viewed as a poetic flaw. The Argives' extensive stint at Nemea is typical of this trend. Hypsipyle's tale, embedded within the Nemean episode, introduces nearly an entire book of material extraneous to the Theban legend. Though seemingly unconnected, the Thebaid's episodes reveal an intricate carmen perpetuum ('unbroken song'), in the manner of Ovid's Metamorphoses: an epic of diverse strands which are held together by an intricate internal structure.

== Textual history ==
=== Date ===
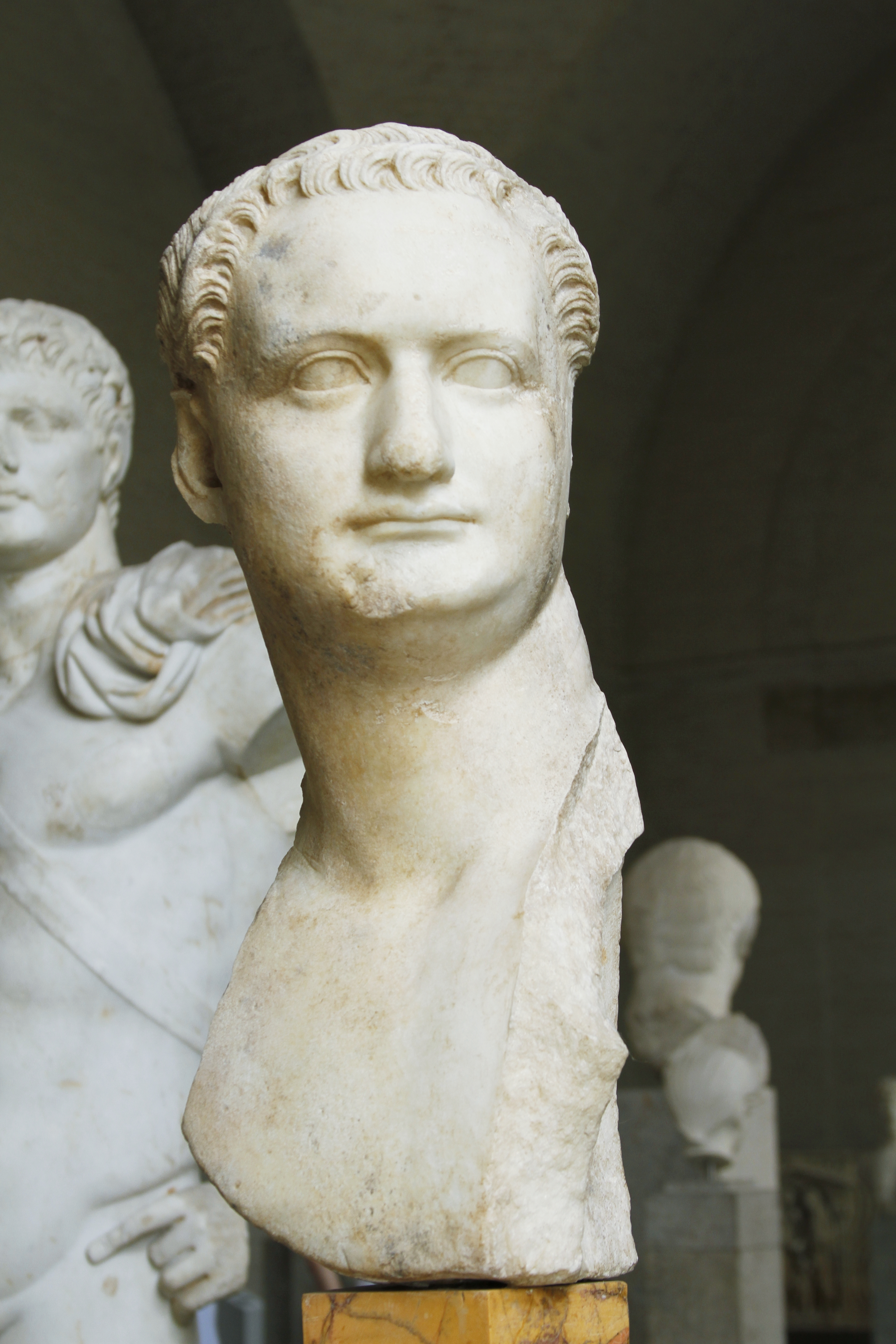
The emperor Domitian, marble bust housed in the Capitoline Museums

Although the precise dating of the Thebaid is unknown, the poem is thought to have been written during the reign of Domitian (80s AD) and published in the early 90s. Statius himself states that he had spent twelve years composing his poem, while the preface to his first book of Silvae, a collection of occasional poems published from 91 onwards, mentions its publication. These circumstances have led some critics to posit a date of publication in 90 or 91. The Latinist D. R. Shackleton Bailey, on the other hand, writes that the Thebaid was "probably" published in 92. The poem precedes by a few years the composition of the Achilleid, Statius' second, unfinished epic begun in 95.

=== Transmission ===
The text of the poem known to modern readers derives from several medieval manuscripts which trace their roots back to the 9th century AD. This tradition is thought to fall into two distinct branches. One, labelled P as a shorthand for Puteaneus, is represented by a single manuscript written at Corbie Abbey and housed in Paris. The other, labelled ω, has spawned numerous descendants, though its original copy, known as the archetype, is lost. P and ω offer diverging text on many occasions with P being considered less corrupted by mistakes. The first printed edition based on these manuscripts was published in Rome around 1470.

== Influences ==
Long before Statius wrote the Thebaid, the Theban legend had been present in ancient Greek literary culture. A Thebaid may have formed part of the Epic Cycle, a group of archaic hexameter poems of which little first hand evidence survives. A poem of the same name was written by the poet Antimachus, who lived in the 4th century BC. It is unknown whether Statius made use of his work since it only survives in a small number of fragments. The Athenian playwright Sophocles wrote three well-known plays about Thebes (Oedipus Rex, Oedipus at Colonus, and Antigone), though no sustained interaction with them has been proved. Euripides' Phoenissae and Aeschylus' Seven Against Thebes, two plays which enjoyed great popularity at Rome, have recently been shown to have influenced Statius' depiction of the Theban war.

Among the Latin literary tradition, the Aeneid, Vergil's epic about the travails of Aeneas, served as Statius' principal model. His debt to this particular poem is expressed near the end of the Thebaid, where the poet exhorts his poem "not to challenge the divine Aeneid, but to follow her at a distance and to always revere her footsteps". The poem also draws on various poetic texts from the first century AD, the most important of which are Ovid's Metamorphoses, Lucan's Bellum civile and the tragedies of Seneca the Younger.

== Reception ==
=== Antiquity and the Middle Ages ===
Writing a generation after Statius, the satirist Juvenal stated that the Thebaid still garnered steady attention from the Roman public. In spite of his testimony, there is little other evidence to suggest that the poem had much currency until late antiquity. The poet Claudian, writing at the court of the emperor Honorius around 400 AD, imitated many of the stylistic features found in the Thebaid. Preserved through the Carolingian Renaissance, the poem was widely read during the High Middle Ages, sparking adaptations such as the Middle Irish Togail na Tebe ("Destruction of Thebes"). Joseph of Exeter, nephew of archbishop Baldwin of Exeter, wrote poetry modelled on the Thebaid that has been described by the Latinist Michael Dewar as the "most sensitive and intelligent" among Statius' medieval admirers.

The Thebaid played an important role in the work of the Italian poet Dante Alighieri. Its influence on the Divine Comedy is, according to Dewar, "manifest and omnipresent". Dante's fascination for Statius, whom he erroneously considered to have been a Christian, is illustrated by his appearance, alongside Vergil, on the fifth terrace of the Purgatorio.

=== Modern approaches ===
Modern classicists held the Thebaid in low esteem for most of the 19th century and the first half of the 20th century. Their views were rooted in a distaste for Statius' perceived lack of originality and his ties to the autocratic regime of the emperor Domitian. Representing such attitudes, the Latinist Robert Maxwell Ogilvie wrote in 1980 that "the Thebaid cannot be said to be about anything". Along with a general re-evaluation of imperial Latin texts, the second half of the 20th century saw a resurgence of critical interest in the poem. In 1973, David Vessey's Statius and the Thebaid provided a sympathetic study which still acknowledged some of the flaws traditionally ascribed by classical scholars. Towards the end of the century, a revisionist school of thought interpreted the Thebaid as a subtle criticism of autocratic government. The poem has since been rehabilitated to a place closer to the centre of the literary canon.

== Works cited ==
- Ahl, Frederick (1984). "Statius Thebaid: a Reconsideration". Aufstieg und Niedergang der römischen Welt. II (32.5): 2803–2912.
- Aricò, Giuseppe (2020). "Narrative Strategies in Statius' Thebaid". The Classical Review. 70 (2): 1–2.
- Coleman, Kathleen M. (2003). "Recent Scholarship". Statius II: Thebaid 1–7. Cambridge, MA: Harvard University Press. pp. 9–37. ISBN 978-0-674-01208-0.
- Dewar, Michael (1991). Statius, Thebaid IX. Oxford: Clarendon Press. ISBN 978-0-19-814480-9.
- Dominik, William J. (1994). The Mythic Voice of Statius: Power and Politics in the Thebaid. Leiden: Brill. ISBN 978-90-04-09972-2.
- Dominik, William J.; Newlands, Carole E.; Gervais, Kyle (2015). "Reading Statius". Brill's Companion to Statius. Leiden: Brill. pp. 1–27. ISBN 978-90-04-28470-8.
- Ganiban, Randall T. (2007). Statius and Virgil: The Thebaid and the Reinterpretation of the Aeneid. Cambridge: Cambridge University Press. ISBN 978-0-521-16911-0.
- Gibson, Bruce (2006). Statius, Silvae 5. Oxford: Oxford University Press. ISBN 978-0-19-927715-5.
- Hardie, Philip (1993). The Epic Successors of Virgil. Cambridge: Cambridge University Press. ISBN 978-0-521-42562-9.
- Howatson, M. C., ed. (2011). "Statius". The Oxford Companion to Classical Literature. Oxford: Oxford University Press. ISBN 978-0-19-954854-5.
- Lewis, C. S. (1936). The Allegory of Love: A Study In Medieval Tradition. Oxford: Clarendon Press. ISBN 978-1-107-65943-8.
- Marinis, Agis (2015). "Statius' Thebaid and Greek Tragedy: The Legacy of Thebes". In Dominik, William J.; Newlands, Carole E.; Gervais, Kyle (eds.). Brill's Companion to Statius. Leiden: Brill. pp. 343–61. ISBN 978-90-04-21789-8.
- Reeve, Michael D. (1984). "Statius: Thebaid". In Reynolds, L. D.; Wilson, N. G. (eds.). Texts and Transmission: A Survey of the Latin Classics. Oxford: Oxford University Press. pp. 394–6. ISBN 978-0-19-814456-4.
- Shackleton Bailey, D. R. (2003). Statius II: Thebaid 1–7. Cambridge, MA: Harvard University Press. ISBN 978-0-674-01208-0.
- Vessey, David (1973). Statius and the Thebaid. Cambridge: Cambridge University Press. ISBN 978-0-521-14751-4.
