= Thoas (son of Jason) =

In Greek mythology, Thoas (Ancient Greek: Θόας, "fleet, swift") was a son of Jason and Hypsipyle, and a grandson of the Lemnian king Thoas, and the twin brother of Euneus. Thoas and Euneus took part in the funeral games of the Nemean king Lycurgus' infant son Opheltes, after which they succeeded in rescuing their mother Hypsipyle from her servitude.

== Family ==
Thoas, and his twin brother Euneus, were the son of Jason, the leader of the Argonauts, and Hypsipyle, the daughter of King Thoas of Lemnos, who was the son of Dionysus and Ariadne.

When the women of Lemnos massacred the Lemnian men, Hypsipyle secretly helped her father escape from the island. She was made queen of Lemnos, and received Jason and the Argonauts when they visited the island. The Argonauts stayed for a while and mated with the women there.

== Mythology ==
=== Euripides' Hypsipyle ===
Thoas was a character in Euripides' partially preserved play Hypsipyle. According to this account, when Jason left Lemnos, he took his infant sons, Thoas and Euneus, with him to Colchis. After he died, Jason's fellow argonaut Orpheus took the boys to Thrace, where he raised them. They eventually met Hypsipyles' father Thoas, who took them back to Lemnos. As young men, the sons embark on a search for their mother.

As the action of the play begins, Thoas and his brother Euneus arrive at the home of Lycurgus in Nemea where their mother Hypsipyle, as a result of the discovery of her having saved her father Thoas, is now a slave and the nurse of Lycurgus' infant son Opheltes. Hypsipyle, who does not recognize her sons, greets them at the door. After Opheltes, while in the care of Hypsipyle, is killed by a serpent, funeral games are held, in which Thoas and Euneus compete. There is a recognition scene in which Hypsipyle and her sons are reunited, and Thoas and Euneus manage to rescue their mother and they all return to Lemnos.

The surviving fragments of Euripides' play do not make it clear how the recognition between the sons and Hypsipyle was brought about, but two later accounts may have been based on the play. According to the Second Vatican Mythographer, after the sons won the foot-race, at the funeral games, their names and parents were announced, and in this way their identities were revealed. The Cyzicene epigrams, the third book of the Palatine Anthology, describes a depiction, on a temple in Cyzicus, of Euneus and Thoas showing Hypsipyle a gold ornament ("the golden vine") as proof of their identities.

=== Statius' Thebaid ===
Statius in his epic poem, the Thebaid, has a few brief mentions of Thoas and his brother Euneus. He has Hypsipyle call the twins "memorials of a forced bed", and describe Jason as "uncaring for his children". Statius describes Thoas and Euneus competing in the chariot race at Opheletes' funeral games:

And see, the young sons of Jason, new glory of their mother Hypsipyle, come to a chariot ... Thoas—family name from his grandfather—and Euneos ... Twins, they had everything the same: face, chariot, horses, dress, nor less concord in their prayers; each wishes to win or to be outrun only by his brother. ... Close together come the twins, now Euneos in front, now Thoas; they yield, they lead, nor ever does ambition for glory cause these loving brothers to clash. ... Thoas begs piebald Podarces to take off ... As he eagerly presses to pass Haemonian Admetus, Thoas crashes, nor did his brother bring him any aid."
