= Lycurgus (of Nemea) =

Son of Pheres and father of Opheltes in Greek mythology

In Greek mythology, Lycurgus (/laɪˈkɜːrɡəs/, /lykôrɡos/; Ancient Greek: Λυκοῦργος, romanized: Lykoûrgos, lit. 'wolf-work', 'tamer of wolves', or 'defender'), also spelled Lykurgos or Lykourgos, was the son of Pheres, and the husband of Eurydice (or Amphithea) by whom he was the father of Opheltes. In the earliest account, Lycurgus was a priest of Nemean Zeus, while in later accounts he was a king of Nemea.

When the army of the Seven against Thebes was passing through Nemea on its way to Thebes, Lycurgus' infant son Opheltes was killed by a serpent, through the negligence of his nursemaid Hypsipyle. The child's funeral games were said to have been the origin of the Nemean Games and Lycurgus' tomb was said to be in the grove of Nemean Zeus.

== Family ==
According to Euripides, Lycurgus was from the Asopus river valley to west of Nemea, and he and his wife Euridice, were the parents of Opheltes. Hyginus also has Eurydice as the mother of Opheltes, however Hyginus' Latin text has Opheltes' father being a king of Nemea named "Lycus", rather than Lycurgus—probably an error. The Latin poet Statius, following Euripides, has Lycurgus and Euridice as the parents of Opheltes, however for Statius, Lycurgus is from Argos, and is both the king of Nemea, and the priest of Zeus.

According to Apollodorus, Opheltes' father Lycurgus was the son of Pheres, who was the son of Cretheus and the founder of Pherae in Thessaly. Pheres had another son Admetus. Lycurgus migrated to Nemea and married Eurydice ("or as some say Amphithea"), by whom he fathered Opheltes.

Pausanias describes an image on the Amyclae throne of Apollo, which depicted Adrastus and Tydeus, two of the Seven against Thebes, stopping a fight between Amphiaraus, another of the Seven, and "Lycurgus the son of Pronax". If this refers to an event during the Seven's stop at Nemea, then this would presumably mean that in some version of the story, Opheltes' father Lycurgus, was the son of Pronax, rather than the son of Pheres, as in Apollodorus' account. However it is more likely that the Lycurgus in the scene described by Pausanias was different from the Lycurgus who was the father of Opheltes.

== Mythology ==
=== Euripides ===
The earliest mention of Lycurgus occurs in Euripides' partially preserved play Hypsipyle. Hypsipyle, the former queen of Lemnos and lover of Jason, has in Euripides' play, come to be a slave of Lycurgus, and nursemaid of Lycurgus and his wife Eurydice's infant son Opheltes. The surviving fragments of the play contain only a few brief references to Lycurgus. In an early scene, Amphiaraus, one of the Seven against Thebes, having just arrived at Lycurgus' house in Nemean Zeus' sacred grove, asks Hypsipyle, whose house it is, and she answers:

These are known as the wealthy halls of Lycurgus, who was chosen from all of Asopia to be the temple-keeper of our local Zeus.

That is, Lycurgus is a priest of Nemean Zeus, from Asopia, a region of the Asopus river valley containing Phlius and located to the west of Nemea. Although he is a king in later accounts, there is no indication of that in the surviving fragments of Euripides' play. In a later scene we learn that Lycurgus is away, and a fragmentary hypothesis of the play refers to guests of his household being "lodged with Lycurgus' wife", further suggesting Lycurgus' absence.

=== Hyginus ===
Hyginus refers to Opheltes' story, in Fabulae 15, 74, and 273. In all three, our received Latin text has "Lycus" as the name of Opheltes' father—however, this is probably a confusion of "Lycurgus", either originally by Hyginus, or perhaps more likely, in the transmission of the Latin text. And, unlike Euripides' account, in Hyginus' version of the story, he is a king, not a priest. Hyginus also tells of an oracle—perhaps given to Lycurgus, although Hyginus does not say—that had warned that Opheltes should not be put on the ground until he had learned to walk. In contrast with Euripides' play, where it is the enraged mother Eurydice, to whom the Seven appeal on Hypsipyle's behalf, and who needs to be appeased, in Hyginus' account it is Lycurgus.

=== Statius ===
The Latin poet Statius' epic poem, the Thebaid—which tells the story of the Seven against Thebes— also gives an account of Lycurgus' infant son Opheltes' death. While only passing references to Lycurgus are found in earlier sources, he has a substantial role in Statius' version of the story. Here Lycurgus is the priest of Zeus (as in Euripides), and the king of Nemea (as in Hyginus).

While Euripides has Lycurgus coming from "Asopia", a region west of Nemea, for Statius Lycurgus is from Argos. He refers to Lycurgus as "Inachian", i.e related to Inachus, the legendary first king of Argos, while Adrastus, the current king of Argos, and leader of the Seven, says of Lycurgus, "our ancestry is one". This raises the question why Lycurgus has not joined his fellow Argives in their war against Thebes, and in fact the hero Tydeus, one of the Seven, calls Lycurgus a "coward", saying "when your countrymen from every quarter have flocked to arms, you only amid the hurrying columns are at peace". However, Statius provides an explanation saying that Lycurgus' absence from the Seven's war with Thebes is due to priestly duties, and oracular warnings:

... taking no part in the Argive war; not that he lacked courage, but temple and altars held him back. Nor yet had the gods’ oracle and warnings of old dropped from his mind, the word received from the depth of the shrine: 'Lycurgus, you shall give first death to the Dircaean [i.e. Theban] war.' Of that he is aware; the dust of Mars close by saddens him, he winces at the trumpets, and wishes the doomed army ill.

Here the "first death" will turn out to be Lycurgus' son Opheltes.

Passing through Nemea, on their way to Thebes, the Seven, in urgent need of water, encounter Hypsipyle with her nursling, the infant Opheltes. In her haste to provide water for the Seven, Hypsipyle leaves Opheltes lying on the ground, while she takes the Seven to a nearby spring. Meanwhile, left unattended, Opheltes is killed by the serpent who guards Zeus' sacred grove.

Unlike in Euripides' play, where it is Eurydice who must be restrained, here, as in Hyginus, it is Lycurgus. When he hears of his son's death, Lycurgus flies into a rage, intending to kill Hypsipyle with his sword, but the Seven intervene to defend Hysipyle. A pitched battle between the Argives, and Lycurgus and his followers nearly breaks out, but finally Adrastus is able to calm both sides, and the seer Amphiaraus, another one of the Seven, is able to appease Lycurgus, by telling him that Ophelts's death was preordained by the gods, and that his son is now a god, and will be "accorded lasting honors".

=== Apollodorus ===
According to the mythographer Apollodorus, Lycurgus, the son of Pheres of Thessaly, migrated to Nemea, married Eurydice (or as he adds "some say, Amphithea") and fathered Opheltes. Apollodorus also gives a brief account of Opheltes' story, in which Lycurgus is only mentioned as being the king of Nemea and the owner of Opheltes' nurse Hypsipyle.

== Tomb ==
The 2nd-century geographer, Pausanias, while describing the site of the Nemean Games, mentions seeing there the "tomb of Lycurgus, the father of Opheltes".
