= Nemean Baths =

Coordinates: 37°48′31″N 22°42′36″E

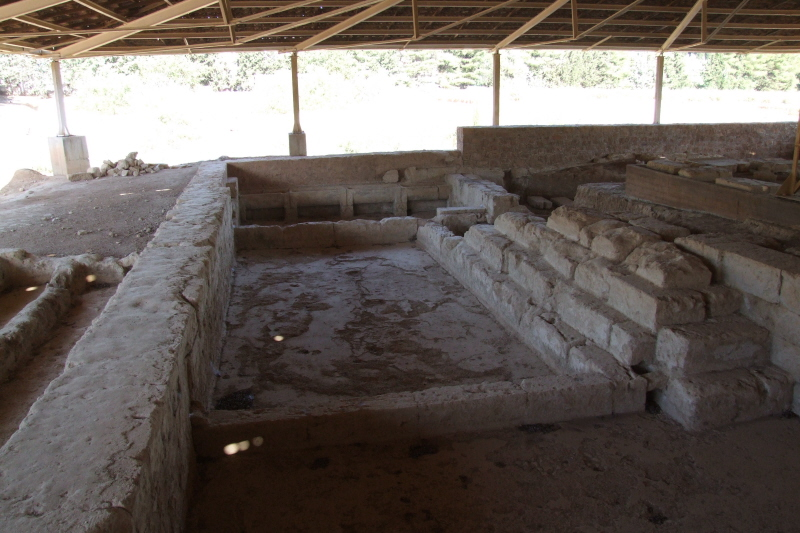
- The Baths of Nemea
- Interactive map of Nemean Baths
- Location: Archaia Nemea, Corinthia, Greece
- Region: Argolis

The baths are labeled 6 on this plan

The Nemean baths are an athletic bathing house at the Panhellenic sanctuary of Nemea in the Argolis. The baths are located in the southernmost part of the Hellenistic complex. They are directly west of the similarly dated Xenon, which served as athletes' lodging.

== Dating of the site ==
Though the sanctuary had existed since the Archaic period, the baths are thought to have been built in the 4th century BC. This first approximation date was first proposed during the 1926 excavations given the position of the site. Subsequent finds seem to suggest that the construction of the baths were part of a larger 4th century monumentalization program at the site. An adjacent 4th century aqueduct that does not appear to feed the baths further supports a post 4th century date. Furthermore, a small Classical trench may be thought to suggest an earlier bath which once occupied the same site. Period pottery in the foundation also seems to correlate to the 4th century.

== Physical description ==
The bath itself is divided between a west wing with a series of basins and an east wing with an open bath, both of which are elevated and accessible beneath a flight of stairs. Under these stairs a terracotta pipe served to let drainage off to a small compartment and then to the river. The source of the water is a matter of contention and archaeological evidence has yet to produce a definitive answer. It is speculated to have come from a yet unknown aqueduct. Channels and reservoirs to leading the bath do survive and suggest a more complicated system than direct delivery. One postulation is that this was to allow the water to heat in the sun before being used in the baths, or else just control temperature.

== Function ==
Along with the Xenon, the bath served as amenities to athletes during the Nemean Games. The individual basin found in the west wing are typical general 4th century Greek baths, and are similar to those found at sites in Eretria and Corinth. They most likely functioned as personal bathing facilities to the athletes during the games. The east wing's circular immersion bath or 'plunge bath' is remarkable as it is one of only four in Greece. Rather than a basin for the individual they seem to have some purpose in communal bathing. Curiously, all four extant immersion baths have been found at Panhellenic athletic sites. Their function is not entirely clear, yet it does seem that they had some ritual or perhaps practical use unique to the Panhellenic Games or else they would be more common to athletic sites.

== Disuse and later history ==
The bath seems to be used by the 1st century AD as evidenced by a layer of silt in the bath. This abandonment predates the end of the Nemean Games in 275 AD, perhaps suggesting the general decline of the site. Through the end of the pagan context of the site, it served as a trash heap. Early Christians turned the temple of Zeus into a Basilica in the 5th century AD and used the open chamber of the bath house as a repository for the dead; thus far, three burials have been found.

== Bibliography ==
- Miller, G. Stephen (1998). "Excavations at Nemea, 1984-1986". Hesperia: The Journal of the American School of Classical Studies at Athens. 57 (1): 1–20. doi:10.2972/hesperia.84.2.0277. JSTOR 10.2972/hesperia.84.2.0277.
