= Cyzicene epigrams =

Collection of Ancient Greek epigrams

The Cyzicene epigrams are a collection of nineteen numbered Greek epigrams, each accompanied by a short prose preamble, which, together with a one-sentence introduction, constitute the third and shortest book of the Palatine Anthology. The epigrams are supposed to have been inscribed somewhere on the columns of the Temple of Apollonis at Cyzicus, a monument which no longer exists. Apollonis was the wife and queen of Attalus I, first king of Pergamon. When she died in the mid-second century BC, two of her sons, Eumenes and Attalus, built a temple in Apollonis' home town of Cyzicus, and dedicated it to her.

According to the one-sentence introduction, each epigram was, apparently, a kind of subtitle for a relief decorating each column of the temple, illustrating a scene from Greek mythology. The prose preamble, taking the place of the carved image, provides a description of it. As befitting a temple built by sons to honor their mother, the preambles describe scenes of love between mothers and sons.

The author and date of the collection is unknown.

== The reliefs described ==
- Dionysus freeing Semele from the Underworld
- Telephus recognised by his mother Auge
- Phoenix blinded by his father Amyntor
- Polymedes and Clytius killing their stepmother
- Cresphontes killing Polyphontes
- Python slain by Apollo and Artemis
- Amphion and Zethus tying Dirce to the bull
- Odysseus in the Underworld with his mother
- Pelias and Neleus freeing their mother Tyro
- Hypsipyle recognising her sons Euneus and Thoas
- Polydectes turned to stone by Perseus
- Ixion killing Phorbas and Polymelus
- Heracles leading Alcmene to the Elysian Fields
- Tityos slain by Apollo and Artemis
- Bellerophon saved by his son Glaucus
- Aeolus and Boeotus saving their mother Melanippe
- Anapis and Amphinomus saving their parents from Etna's eruption
- Kleobis and Biton helping their mother Cydippe
- Romulus and Remus saving their mother Rhea Silvia
