= Hypsipyle =

Queen of Lemnos in Greek mythology

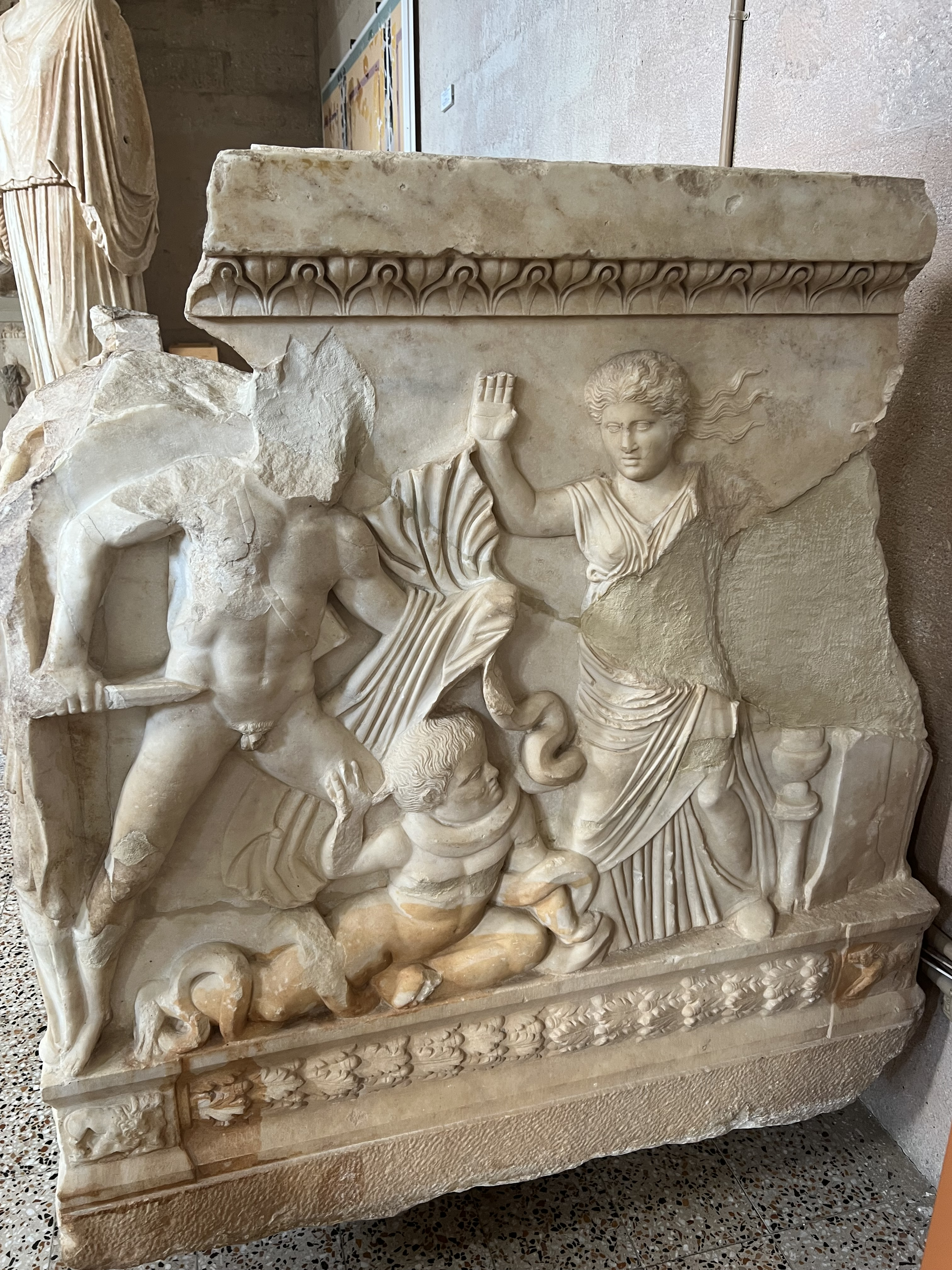
Hypsipyle and the death of Opheltes on a Roman sarcophagus from Corinth.

In Greek mythology, Hypsipyle (Ancient Greek: Ὑψιπύλη, romanized: Hupsipúlē, lit. 'high gate') was a queen of Lemnos, and the daughter of King Thoas of Lemnos, and the granddaughter of Dionysus and Ariadne. When the women of Lemnos killed all the males on the island, Hypsipyle saved her father Thoas. She ruled Lemnos when the Argonauts visited the island, and had two sons by Jason, the leader of the Argonauts. Later the women of Lemnos discovered that Thoas had been saved by Hypsipyle and she was sold as a slave to Lycurgus, the king of Nemea, where she became the nurse of the king's infant son Opheltes, who was killed by a serpent while in her care. She is eventually freed from her servitude by her sons.

== Family ==
Hypsipyle's father was Thoas, who was the son of Dionysus and Ariadne. According to the Iliad, Hypsipyle was the mother, by Jason, of Euneus. Later sources say that Hypsipyle had, in addition to Euneus, a second son by Jason. In Euripides' partially preserved play Hypsipyle, she and Jason had twin sons: Euneus and Thoas. According to Apollodorus, the second son was Nebrophonus, while according to Hyginus, the second son was Deipylus, Ovid says simply that Hypsipyle bore Jason twins, without naming them.

== The Lemnian crime and the rescue of Thoas ==
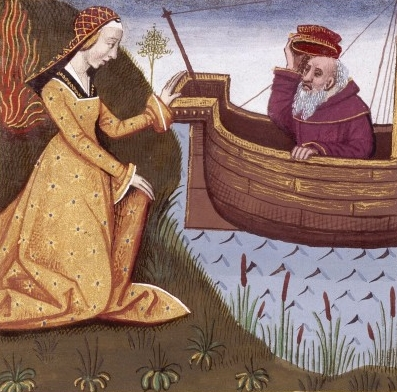
Hypsipyle saving Thoas.

The women of Lemnos killed all the males on the island, except for Thoas, who was saved by Hypsipyle. Traces of the story can be found in the Iliad (c. 8th century), where Lemnos is referred to as the "city of godlike Thoas", and Euneus, Jason's son by Hypsipyle, is mentioned. As early as Aeschylus the story was famous: "the Lemnian holds first place among evils in story: it has long been told with groans as an abominable calamity. Men compare each new horror to Lemnian troubles." And by the time of the mid-5th-century BC historian Herodotus, the story had given rise to the proverbial phrase "Lemnian crime" used to mean any cruel deed. Aeschylus probably dealt with it in his' lost tragedies Hypsipyle and Lemniai (late 6th century-early 5th century BC). The lyric poet Pindar (late 6th century-early 5th century BC) mentions "the race of the Lemnian women, who killed their husbands."

=== Hypsipyle ===
There is a brief mention of the story in Euripides' partially preserved play Hypsipyle (c. 410 BC), in an exchange between Hypsipyle and her son Euneus:

Hypsipyle

Alas, the flight that I fled, my son—if you only knew it—from sea-girt Lemnos, because I did not cut off my father’s grey head!

Euneus

Did they really order you to kill your father?

Hypsipyle

I am gripped by fear of those evil events—O my son, like Gorgons they slew their husbands in their beds!

=== Apollonius of Rhodes' Argonautica ===
The earliest extant telling of the story in detail occurs in the 3rd-century BC Argonautica by Apollonius of Rhodes. According to this account, the women of Lemnos had long neglected the worship of Aphrodite, and because of this the goddess caused their husbands to spurn them in favor of captive Thracian women. In revenge, the women massacred all the males on the island, except for the "aged" Thoas, whom Hypsipyle put into a "hollow chest," setting him adrift on the open sea. Fishermen pulled him ashore on the island of Sicinus. The Lemnian women took over all the previous work of the men, cattle-herding, plowing, and warfare.

=== Valerius Flaccus' Argonautica ===
The 1st-century AD Latin poet Valerius Flaccus, in his Argonautica, gives a different reason for Aphrodite (Venus) causing the Lemnian men to reject their wives. He says it was because of the goddess' anger with her husband, the god Hephaestus (Vulcan)—who had a home on Lemnos—for his having caught her in a tryst with Ares (Mars). He also gives a more detailed account of Thoas' rescue and escape. During the night of the massacre, Hypsipyle woke Thoas, covered his head, and took him to Dionysus' temple where she hid him. The next morning, Hypsipyle disguised Thoas as the temples' cult statue of Dionysus, placed him on the ritual chariot (used to parade the statue). She then took Thoas through the streets of the city, crying aloud that the god's statue had been polluted by the night's bloody murders, and needed to be cleansed in the sea. By this subterfuge, and with the god Dionysus' help, Thoas was safely hid outside the city. But fearing discovery, Hypsipyle finds an old abandoned boat, in which Thoas put to sea, eventually reaching the land of the Taurians, where "Diana put a sword in his hand, and didst appoint him warden of thy cheerless altar". And the women of Lemnos bestow on Hypsipyle "the throne and sceptre of her father as by right".

=== Other accounts ===
Other accounts tell similar stories, with variations. According to the 1st-century AD Latin poet Statius, Hypsipyle hid Thoas on a ship, while according to the late 1st-century BC Latin mythographer Hyginus, who identifies Thoas with the Thoas who was the Taurian king, Hypsipyle put Thoas onto a ship which a storm carried to the "island Taurica".

According to the Greek mythographer Apollodorus (first or second century AD), the women of Lemnos were rejected by their husbands because Aphrodite had caused them to emit a foul odor. Apollodorus also gives a different ending to the story: while Thoas was saved when Hypsipyle hid him, when, sometime later, the Lemnian women discovered that Thoas had escaped the initial slaughter, they killed Thoas, and sold Hypsipyle into slavery.

== Affair with Jason ==
The first adventure (usually) of Jason and the Argonauts, on their quest for the Golden Fleece, is their visit to the island of Lemnos, where Hypsipyle was then queen. The story seems at least as old as the Iliad, since Euneus is said to be a son of Jason and Hypsipyle, and was dealt with in Aeschylus' lost tragedies Hypsipyle and Lemniai, although the only surviving detail is that the Lemnian women "in arms" refused to allow the Argonauts to land until they agreed to mate with them. Pindar refers to the visit, mentioning the Argonauts engaging in athletic contests, receiving garments made by the Lemnian women as prizes, and sharing the women's beds. In Sophocles' lost play Lemniai, there was apparently a battle between the Argonauts and the Lemnian women. The story also played a part in Euripides' partially preserved play Hypsipyle, where Hypsipyle is reunited with her twin sons by Jason, Euneus and Thoas, and learns, to her sorrow, of Jason's death.

=== Apollonius of Rhodes' Argonautica ===
The first complete account of the Argonauts encounter with Hypsipyle on Lemnos is given in Apollonius of Rhodes' Argonautica. According to Apollonius of Rhodes' version of the story, when the Argonauts first arrive, Hypsipyle and the women, fearing that the Argonauts' were Thracians coming to attack them, put on armour and rush to the beach, to defend their island. However the Argonauts herald Aethalides was able to persuade Hypsipyle to allow the Argonauts to stay for one night on the island.

The next day, sitting on her father's throne, Hypsipyle spoke to the assembled women of the Island:

My friends, come, let us give these men gifts to their liking, such things as men ought to take with them on a ship, provisions and sweet wine, so that they might forever remain outside our walls, lest out of need they may come among us and get to know us all too accurately, and an evil report may travel far and wide. For we have done a terrible deed, and it will not be at all heart-cheering to them either, if they were to learn of it.

However, Hypsipyle's old nurse Polyxo said that, rather than live in continual fear of attack, they should take the Argonauts as their mates and protectors. All the women agreed to this plan, and so Hypsipyle received the Argonauts as welcome guests.

Hypsipyle told Jason the Lemnian women's story, saying that because of Aphrodite, the men of Lemnos had come to hate their wives, expelling them from their homes, and replacing them with Thracian girls captured on their frequent raids on nearby Thrace. Finally, after enduring terrible hardship, the women found the courage to take action. But Hypsipyle did not tell of the massacre, instead she deceived Jason, saying that one day when the men were returning from a raid, the women refused to allow the men to reenter the city, so the men took their sons and resettled in Thrace. Hypsipyle then asked Jason and his men to stay and take up residence on the island.

So the Argonauts stayed for a while on the island, residing with the women in their homes, including Jason, who lived with Hypsipyle in her palace. But finally, at the urging of Heracles, who had remained apart, the Argonauts agreed to leave the women, and continue their quest for the Golden Fleece.

Hypsipyle told Jason that "her father's scepter will be waiting" for him should he return to the island, but that she does not think that he will, and asked him to promise to remember her always, and to tell her what she should do with any children of his she might bear. And Jason told her to send any son, when grown, to Jason's parents in Iolcus. Jason took with him a "sacred purple robe", given to him by Hypsipyle, which had been made by the Graces for Dionysus, who gave it to his son Thoas, who in turn gave it to Hypsipyle.

=== Later accounts ===
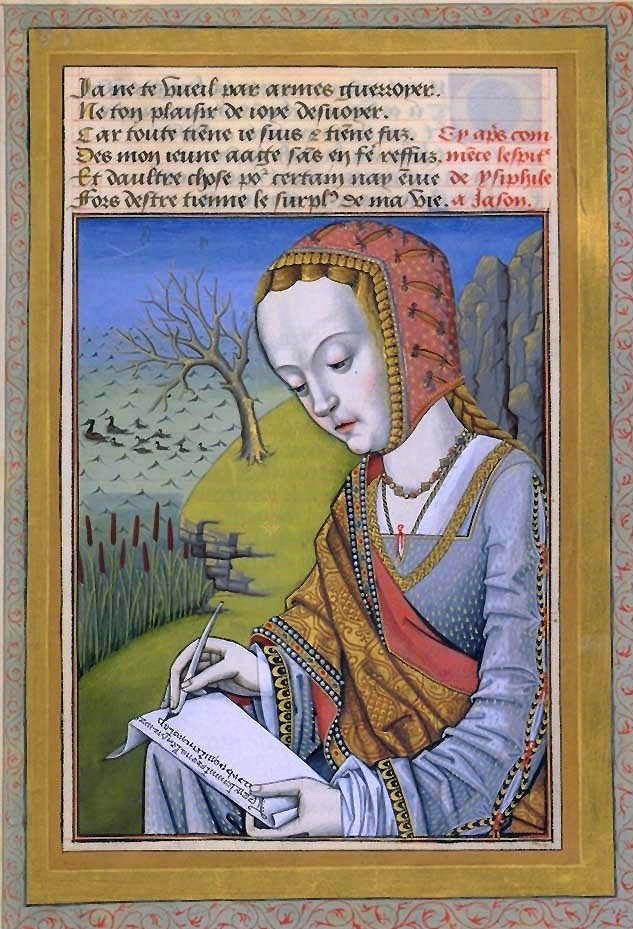
Hypsipyle writing to Jason

The Roman poets Ovid, Valerius Flaccus, and Statius, all wrote about the affair of Hypsipyle and Jason. Their accounts are all similar to that of Apollonius of Rhodes, with a few variations and additional details.

In his Heroides 6, Ovid has Hypsipyle, in an angry letter, rebuke Jason for having forsaken her for Medea, who she says "intrudes upon my marriage-bed". She says that Jason spent two years on Lemnos, and that, although he promised her "thine own will I ever be", and told her of his hope to share in the parenting of their offspring then in her womb, she now knows that Jason has taken up with Medea, and calls all these words of Jason "lies".

In his Argonautica, Valerius Flaccus, when the Argonauts are making ready to leave Lemnos, has a "weeping" Hypsipyle say to Jason: "So quickly, at the first clear sky, dost thou resolve to unfurl thy sails, O dearer to me than mine own father? ... Is it then to the sky and to the waves that hindered thy course that we owed thy tarrying?" She then gives Jason a "tunic of woven handiwork", and her father's sword "with its renowned emblem", "the flaming gift of Aetna's god", (i.e Vulcan), asking him to "forget not the land that first folded you to its peaceful bosom; and from Colchis' conquered shores bring back hither thy sails, I pray thee, by this Jason whom thou leavest in my womb."

Statius in his Thebaid has Hypsipyle say that her union with Jason "was not by my will", calling Jason her "ungentle guest", and her twin offspring by Jason, "memorials of a forced bed". She describes Jason as a "brute ... uncaring for his children and pledged word!".

== Nurse of Opheltes ==
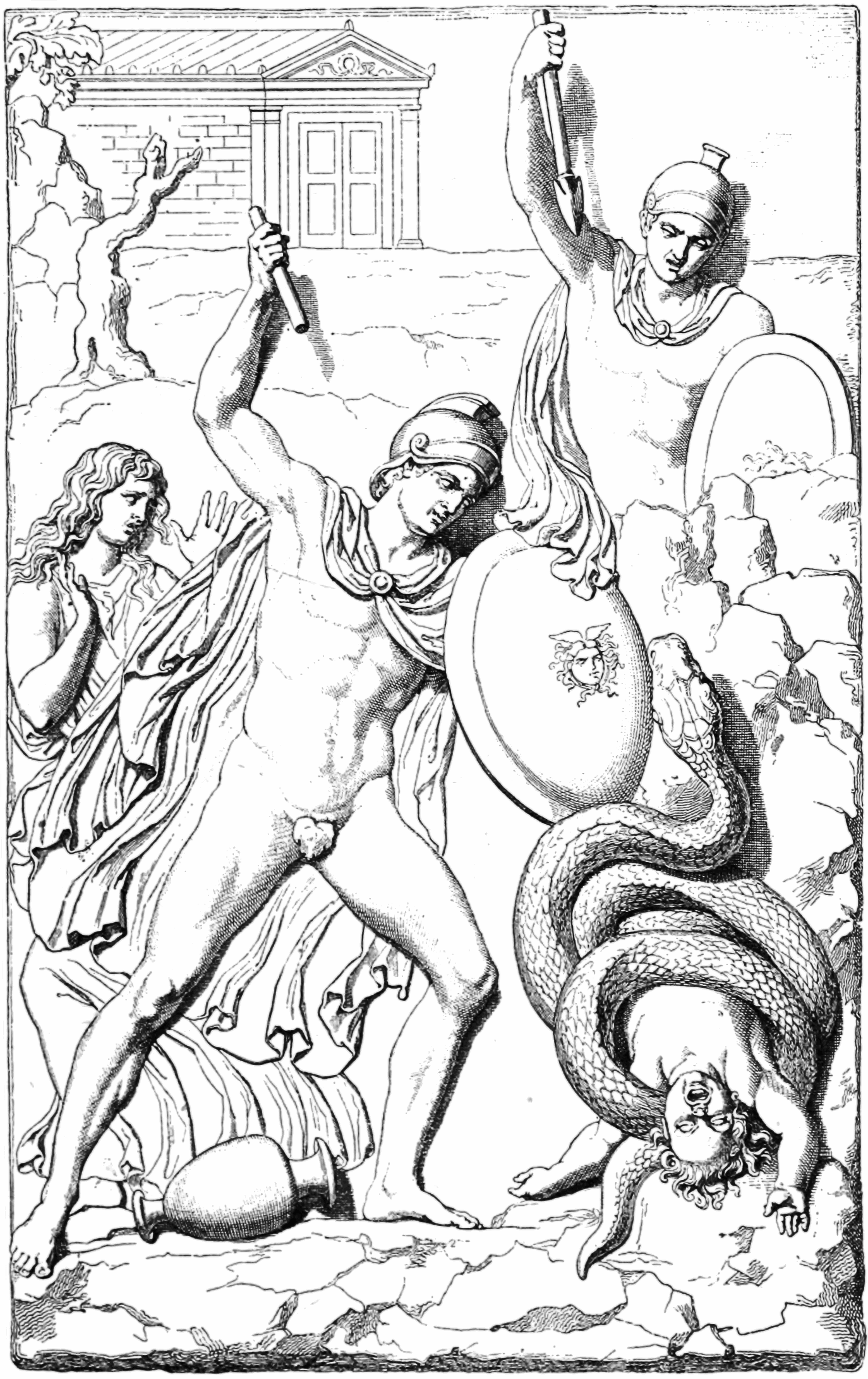
Opheltes ensnared by the serpent.

Hypsipyle became involved in the story of the infant Opheltes, the Seven against Thebes, and the origin of the Nemean Games. On their way to Thebes, the Seven, in need of water, stop at Nemea, where they encounter Hypsipyle. Because of the discovery of her having saved Thoas, Hypsipyle has been sold into slavery to the parents of Opheltes, becoming his nursemaid. While helping the Seven to get water, Hypsipyle sets Opheltes down, and he is killed by a serpent. The Seven kill the serpent, and the seer Amphiaraus, one of the Seven, renames the child Archemorus, meaning the "Beginning of Doom", interpreting the child's death as a harbinger of the Seven's own impending doom at Thebes. The Seven save Hypsipyle from being put to death and hold funeral games in the child's honor, which become the origin of the Nemean Games. Hypsipyle's sons arrive, compete in the funeral games, and rescue Hypsipyle from her captivity.

=== Hypsipyle ===
The earliest involvement of Hypsipyle in the Opheltes/Archemorus story occurs in Euripides' Hypsipyle, and may well have been an Euripidean invention. After fleeing Lemnos, Hypsipyle was captured by pirates and sold as a slave to Lycurgus, the priest of Zeus at Nemea, where she has become the nurse to Lycurgus and Eurydice's son Opheltes.

As the action of the play begins, Hypsipyle's twin sons by Jason, Euneus and Thoas, arrive seeking shelter for the night. The sons have been separated from Hypsipyle since infancy, so neither recognizes the other. When Jason left Lemnos he had taken his sons to Colchis. After he died, Jason's fellow argonaut Orpheus took the boys to Thrace, where he raised them. They eventually met Hypsipyles' father Thoas, who took them back to Lemnos. From there they embarked on a search for their mother.

The Seven against Thebes have also just arrived and encounter Hypsipyle. Amphiaraus tells Hypsipyle that they need water for a sacrifice, and she leads the Seven to a spring. Hypsipyle brings Opheltes with her, and somehow, in a moment of neglect, Opheltes is killed by a serpent. The child's mother Eurydice is about to have Hypsipyle put to death, when Amphiaraus arrives and Hypsipyle pleads with him to speak in her defense. Amphiaraus tells Euridice that the child's death was destined, proposes that funeral games be held in Opheltes' honor, and is able to convince Euridice to spare Hypsipyle's life. Funeral games are held, and Hypsypyle's sons participate, as a result of which, a recognition and reunion between Hypsipyle and her sons is effected, who then manage to free Hypsipyle from her servitude.

The surviving fragments of Euripides' play do not make it clear how the recognition between Hypsipyle and her sons was brought about, but two later accounts may have been based on the play. According to the Second Vatican Mythographer, after the sons won the foot-race, at the funeral games, their names and parents were announced, and in this way their identities were revealed. The Cyzicene epigrams, the third book of the Palatine Anthology, describes a depiction, on a temple in Cyzicus, of Euneus and Thoas showing Hypsipyle a gold ornament ("the golden vine") as proof of their identities.

=== Hyginus ===
According to Hyginus, when the women of Lemnos discovered Hypsipyle's deception, they tried to kill her, but, as in Euripides' play, she fled the island and was captured by pirates who sold her as a slave (although Hyginus' Latin text—probably in error—says she was sold to "King Lycus", rather than Lycurgus).

Hyginus also tells of an oracle that had warned that Opheltes should not be put on the ground until he had learned to walk, and says that, to avoid setting the child directly on the ground, she put him on a bed of wild celery where he is killed by a serpent who guarded the spring. Hyginus connects this with the tradition of the celery crowns awarded to the winners at the Nemean games. According to Hyginus, as in Euripides, the Seven intercede on Hypsipyle's behalf, but with Lycurgus, rather than Eurydice.

=== The Thebaid ===
Statius, in his epic poem, the Thebaid—which tells the story of the Seven against Thebes—preserves the most complete account of the myth of Hypsipyle and Opheltes. As in Hyginus' account, when the Lemnian women discovered that Thoas had been saved, Hypsipyle fled the island, but was captured by pirates, and sold as a slave to Lycurgus, who is both the king of Nemea (as in Hyginus) and the priest of Zeus (as in Euripides).

As in Euripides, Hypsipyle, who has become the nurse of Lycurgus and Eurydice's son Opheltes, encounters the Seven against Thebes, who are in urgent need of water. However in Statius' account, Hypsipyle does not take Opheltes with her to the spring, instead, in her haste to provide water for the Seven, she leaves the child behind, lying on the ground, "lest she be too slow a guide". Hypsipyle takes the Seven to the spring, and when they have drunk their fill, they ask Hypsipyle to tell them who she is. Then, over the course of 471 lines of the Thebaid, Hypsipyle tells the Seven her story: the massacre of the men by the Lemnian women, her saving her father Thoas, the visit to Lemnos by the Argonauts, her twin sons, Euneus and Thoas, by Jason, and how she came to be the nurse of Opheltes. Meanwhile, with Hypsipyle long delayed at the spring telling her story, and "oblivious (so the gods would have it) of her absent charge", Opheltes has fallen asleep in the grass, and though unnoticed, he is killed by an unwitting swish of the tail of the enormous serpent who guards Zeus' sacred grove.

Hypsipyle is again saved, by the Seven, from execution, but here, as in Hyginus, it is the king who is restrained. As in Euripides, Hypsipyles' sons Thoas and Euneus, who are searching for their mother, arrive at the palace. In Statius' poem, Hypsipyle is able to identify her sons by means of the swords they carry, which belonged to Jason, and bear the mark of Jason's ship the Argo on them, and a joyous reunion ensues.

=== Apollodorus ===
Apollodorus, generally follows Euripides' account of the story, but differs at two points. According to Apollodorus, it was the Lemnian women themselves who, having discovered that Thoas had been spared, sold Hypsipyle into slavery. Also according to Apollodorus, as in Statius' account, Hypsipyle left Opheltes behind when she led the Seven to the spring.

== In literature ==
- In his work, Inferno, the 14th-century Italian poet Dante Alighieri placed Jason in the eighth circle of Hell, along with seducers and panderers, for his deception and abandonment of Hypsipyle.
- In the Purgatorio, Dante's guide Virgil notes that Hypsipyle is among the virtuous pagans in Limbo (Canto 22.112)
