= Opheltes =

Figure in Greek mythology

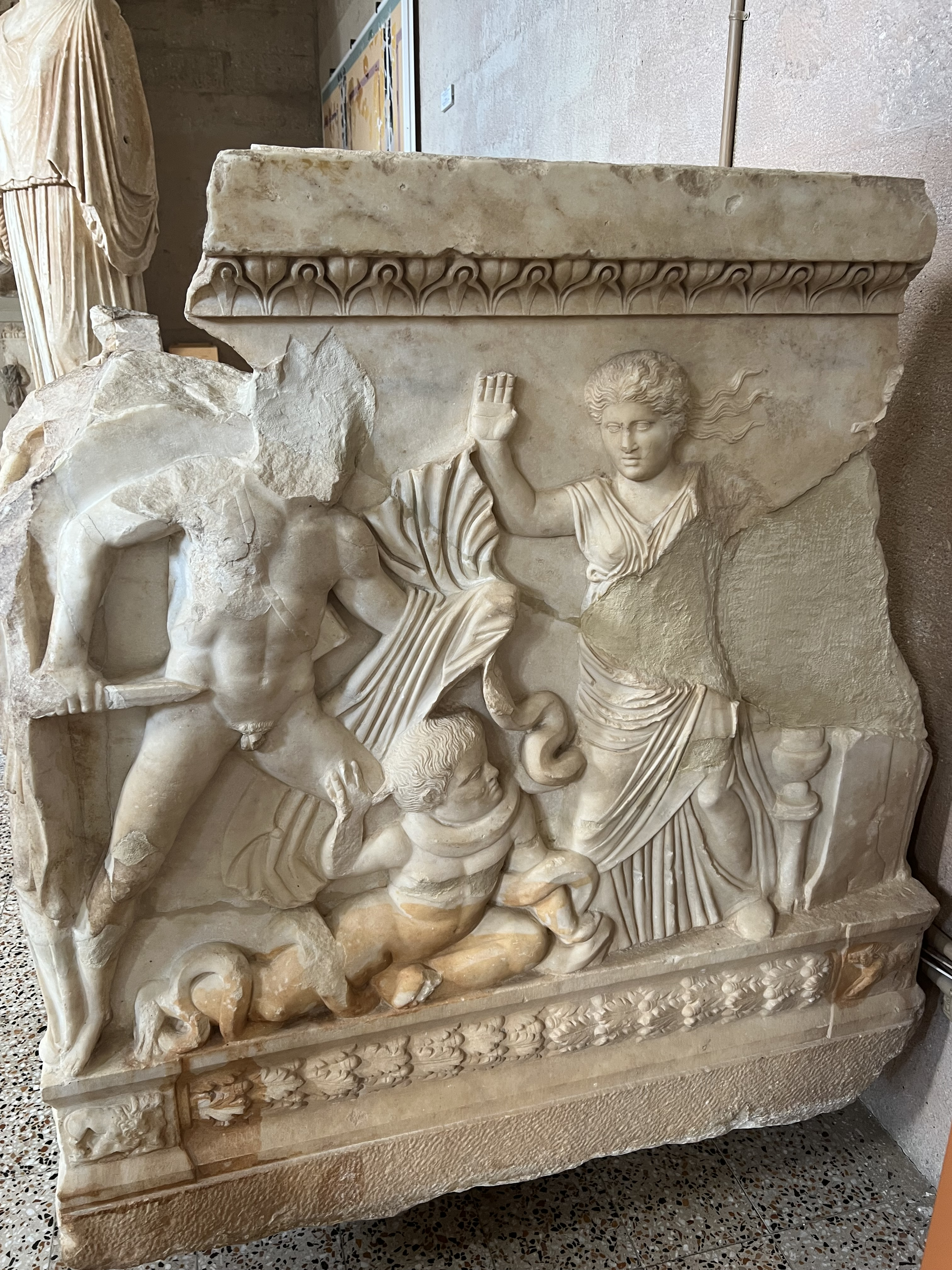
Death of Opheltes on a Roman sarcophagus from Corinth.

In Greek mythology, Opheltes (Ancient Greek: Ὀφέλτης), also called Archemorus (Αρχέμορος, Beginning of Doom), was a son of Lycurgus of Nemea. His mother is variously given as Eurydice, Nemea, or Amphithea. As an infant, he was killed by a serpent at Nemea. Funeral games were held in the boy's honor; according to some traditions these funeral games were the origin of the Nemean Games.

== Family ==
According to Euripides, Opheltes' parents were Lycurgus, the priest of Zeus at Nemea, and Euridice. However Hyginus' Latin text calls Opheltes' father "Lycus", rather than Lycurgus—probably an error—and here he is a king, rather than a priest. The Latin poet Statius, following Euripides, has Lycurgus and Euridice as the parents of Opheltes, however for Statius, Lycurgus is both the king of Nemea, and the priest of Zeus.

In agreement with Euripides, Apollodorus also says that Opheltes, "afterwards called Archemorus", was the son of Lycurgus (his father being Pheres, the son of Cretheus) and Eurydice, adding "or, as some say, Amphithea", but like Hyginus, Apollodorus has Lycugus as king of Nemea. Scholia to Pindar's Nemean Odes, say that in Aeschylus, Opheltes' mother is Nemea, presumably the eponymous nymph of Nemea.

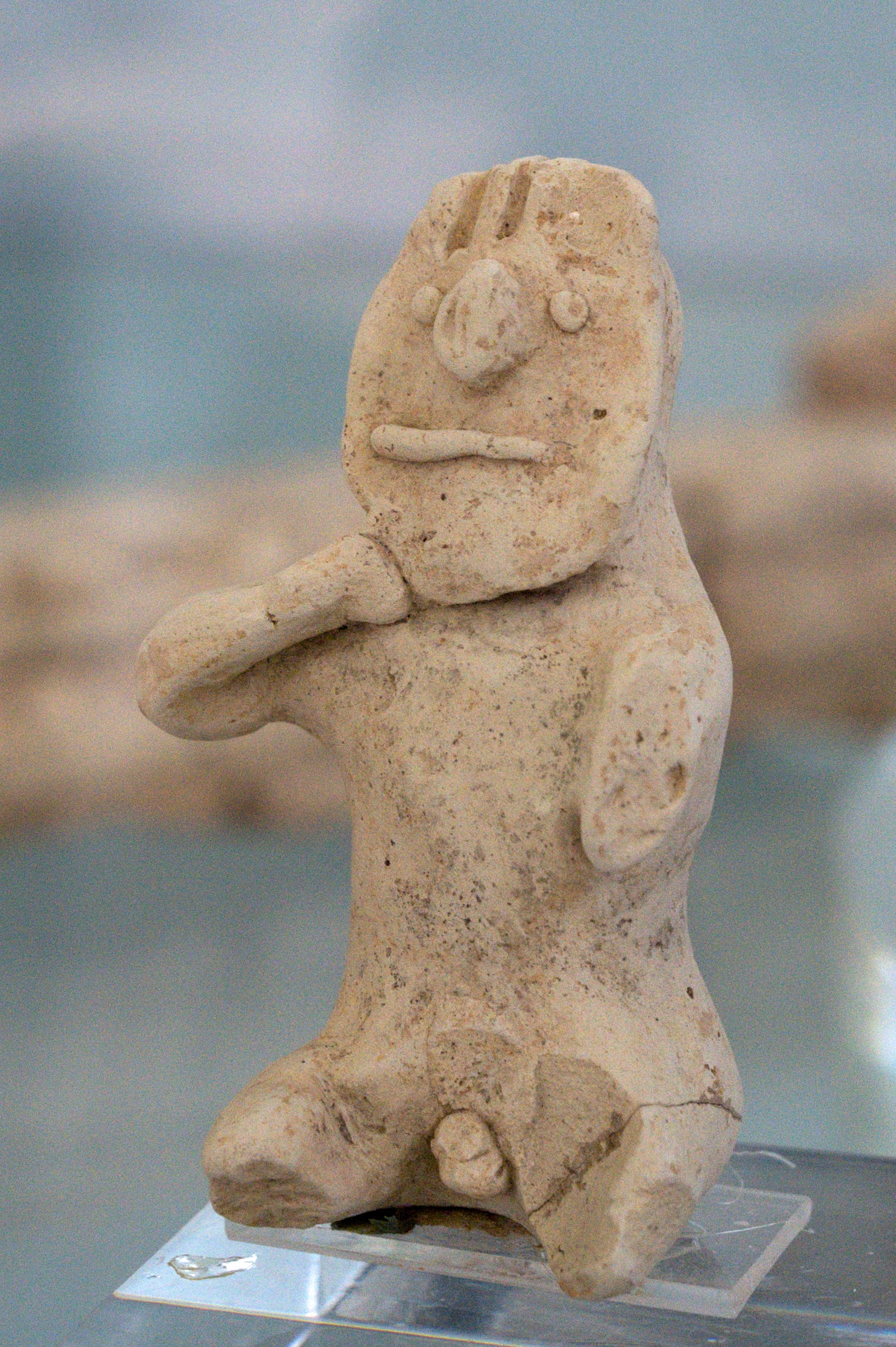
Small figurine of a little boy, probably Opheltes, from the Heroon at Nemea. Archaeological Museum of Nemea, TC 117.

== Story ==
The infant Opheltes, killed by a serpent, is part of the story of the Seven against Thebes, and the origin of the Nemean Games. On their way to Thebes, the Seven, in need of water, stop at Nemea, where they encounter Hypsipyle, who is the nurse of Opheltes. While helping the Seven to get water, Hypsipyle sets Opheltes down, and he is killed by a serpent. The Seven kill the serpent, and the seer Amphiaraus, one of the Seven, renames the child Archemorus, meaning the "Beginning of Doom", interpreting the child's death as a harbinger of the Seven's own impending doom at Thebes. The Seven hold funeral games in the child's honor, which become the origin of the Nemean Games.

== Sources ==
=== Early ===
Opheltes' story perhaps played an integral part of the lost Greek epic Thebaid (c. 8th century BC or early 7th century BC). The earliest surviving reference to the story occurs in a fragment of Simonides (c. 556–468 BC), preserved by Athenaeus, which describes Opheltes (referred to by Athenaeus as "the hero Archemorus") as a "suckling child", mourned as he dies. His mother (unnamed in the lines provided by Athenaeus) seems to have been described by Simonides as "violet-crowned" (ἰοστεφάνου). The next earliest mention occurs in a mid-fifth-century BC poem by Bacchylides, which says that the Argive heroes, known as the Seven against Thebes, established the Nemean Games in honor of Archemorus, whom a "fiery-eyed monstrous" serpent killed while he was sleeping, with his death taken as an omen "of the slaughter to come", i.e. the disaster awaiting the Seven at Thebes. Pindar's (c. 518 – 438 BC) Nemean Odes contain several allusions to the founding of the Nemean Games, by Adrastus, one of the Seven, but does not say why. Aeschylus (c. 525/524 – c. 456/455 BC) apparently dealt with the story, perhaps in his lost play Nemea, since Pindaric scholia tell us that Aeschylus attributed the origin of the Nemean Games to the funeral games of Archemorus.

=== Hypsipyle ===
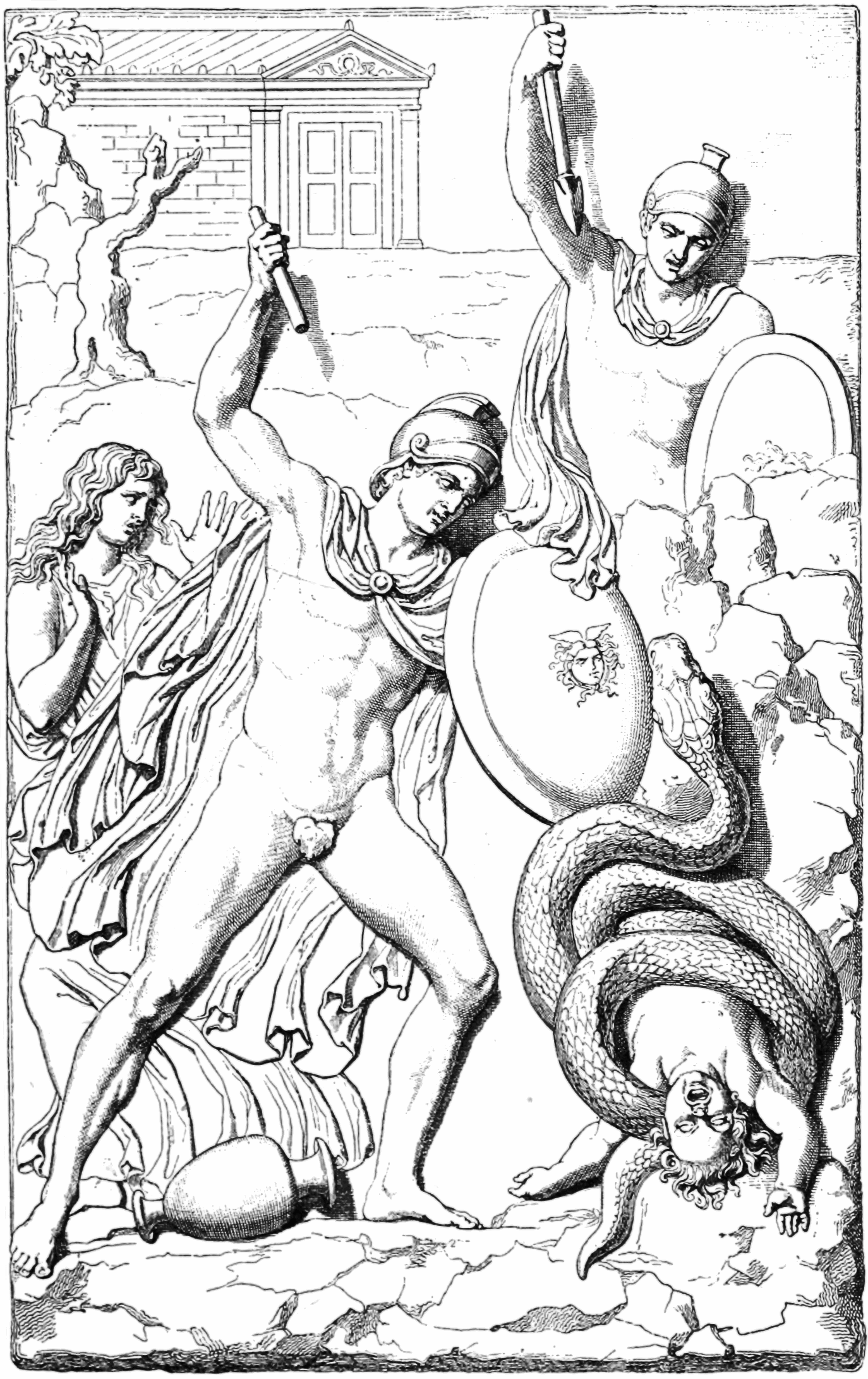
Opheltes ensnared by the serpent.

The most complete account of Opheltes' story occurs in Euripides' partially preserved play Hypsipyle (c. 411–407 BC). This play is the earliest source to involve Hypsipyle in Opheltes' story, and may well have been a Euripidean invention. Here Hypsipyle, the former queen of Lemnos and lover of Jason, has come to be a slave, and nursemaid of the infant Opheltes, who is the son of Lycurgus, the priest of Zeus at Nemea, and his wife Eurydice.

The Seven against Thebes, having just arrived at Nemea, encounter Hypsipyle. Amphiaraus tells her that they need water for a sacrifice, and she leads the Seven to a spring. Hypsipyle brings Opheltes with her, and somehow, in a moment of neglect, Opheltes is killed by a serpent. Eurydice is about to have Hypsipyle put to death, when Amphiaraus arrives, tells Euridice that the child's death was destined, and proposes that funeral games be held in Opheltes' honor. Amphiaraus is able to convince Euridice to spare Hypsipyle's life, and the games are held.

=== Hyginus ===
Hyginus tells of an oracle that had warned that Opheltes should not be put on the ground until he had learned to walk, and says that, to avoid setting the child directly on the ground, Hypsipyle put him on a bed of wild celery where he is killed by a serpent who guarded the spring. Hyginus connects this with the tradition of the celery crowns awarded to the winners at the Nemean games. According to Hyginus, as in Euripides, the Seven intercede on Hypsipyle's behalf, but with Lycurgus, rather than Eurydice. Hyginus also says that the Nemean Games, established by the Seven on their way to sack Thebes, were held for Opheltes (here called Archemorus).

=== Statius' Thebaid ===
Statius, in his epic poem, the Thebaid—which tells the story of the Seven against Thebes—also gives an account of Opheltes' story. In the Thebaid, Opheltes' father Lycurgus is the priest of Zeus (as in Euripides), and the king of Nemea (as in Hyginus).

As in Euripides, Hypsipyle, the nurse of Lycurgus and Eurydice's son Opheltes, encounters the Seven against Thebes, who are in urgent need of water. However, in Statius' account, Hypsipyle, does not take Opheltes with her to the spring, instead, in her haste to provide water for the Seven, she leaves the child behind, lying on the ground, "lest she be too slow a guide". Hypsipyle takes the Seven to the spring, and when they have drunk their fill, they ask Hypsipyle to tell them who she is. Hypsipyle, then tells the Seven her story: the massacre of the men by the Lemnian women, her saving her father Thoas, the visit to Lemnos by the Argonauts, her twin sons, Euneus and Thoas, by Jason, and how she came to be the nurse of Opheltes. Meanwhile, with Hypsipyle long delayed at the spring telling her story, and "oblivious (so the gods would have it) of her absent charge", Opheltes has fallen asleep in the grass, and though unnoticed, he is killed by an unwitting swish of the tail of the enormous serpent who guards Zeus' sacred grove.

Hypsipyle is again saved, by the Seven, from being executed, but here, as in Hyginus, it is the king who is restrained.

=== Apollodorus ===
Apollodorus, generally follows Euripides' account of the story, however according to Apollodorus, as in Statius' account, Hypsipyle left Opheltes behind when she led the Seven to the spring.

== The Heroön of Opheltes ==
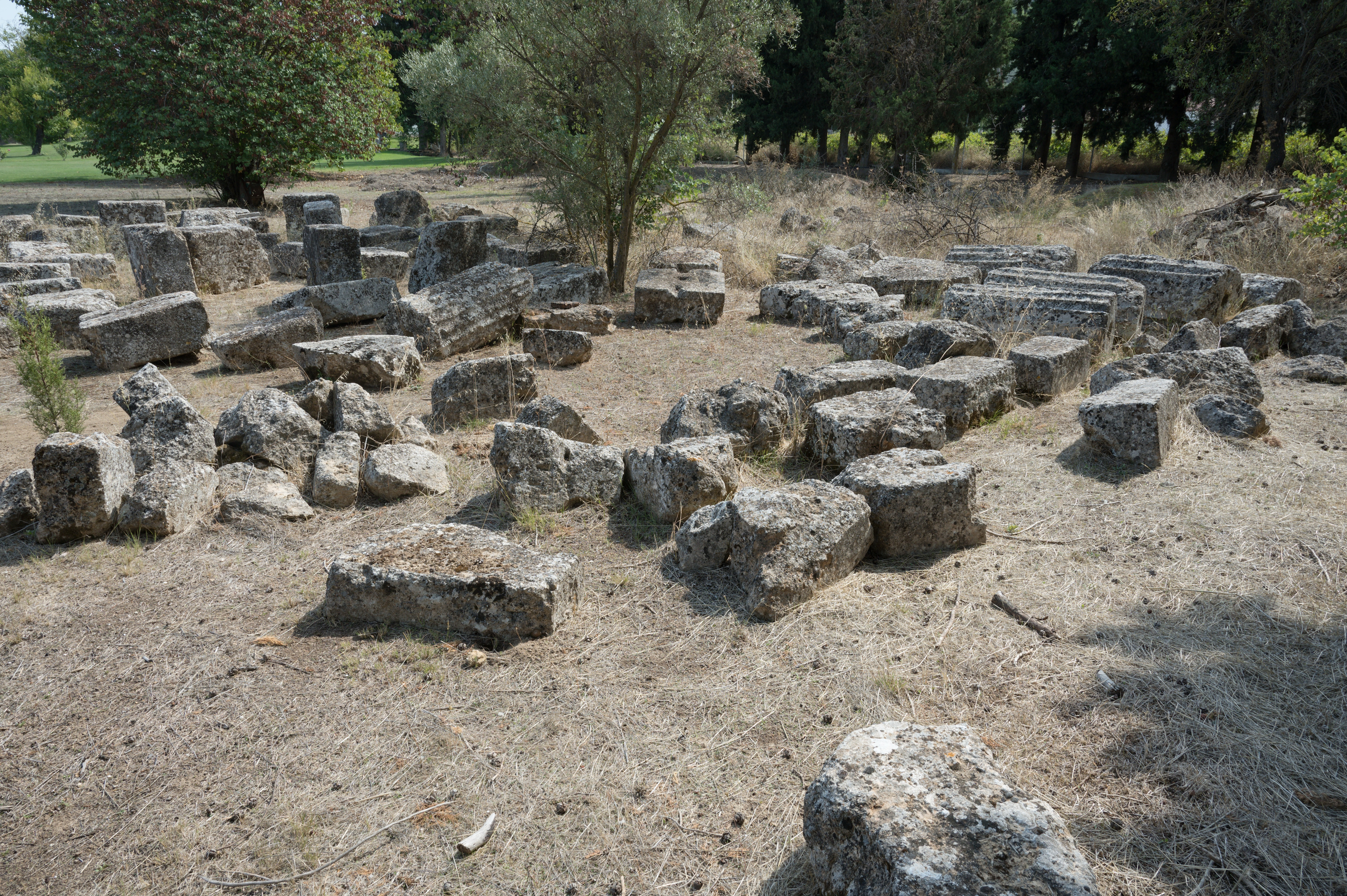
Hero shrine of Opheltes, Nemea

The 2nd-century AD geographer Pausanias describes seeing a shrine at Nemea, which he calls the "grave of Opheltes", and which he describes as containing altars enclosed by a stone wall, and nearby a mound of earth which he identifies as the tomb of Opheltes' father Lycurgus. Excavations at Nemea by the University of California discovered the likely site of the hero shrine (heroön) of Opheltes in 1979. The excavations have uncovered an open-air precinct, located some 100 meters southwest of the Temple of Zeus, founded in the Archaic period.

== Mount Opheltes ==
According to John Tzetzes, there were two mountains on Euboea, one of which was named after Opheltes, and the other after Zarex.
