= Nemean Games =

One of the four Panhellenic Games of Ancient Greece

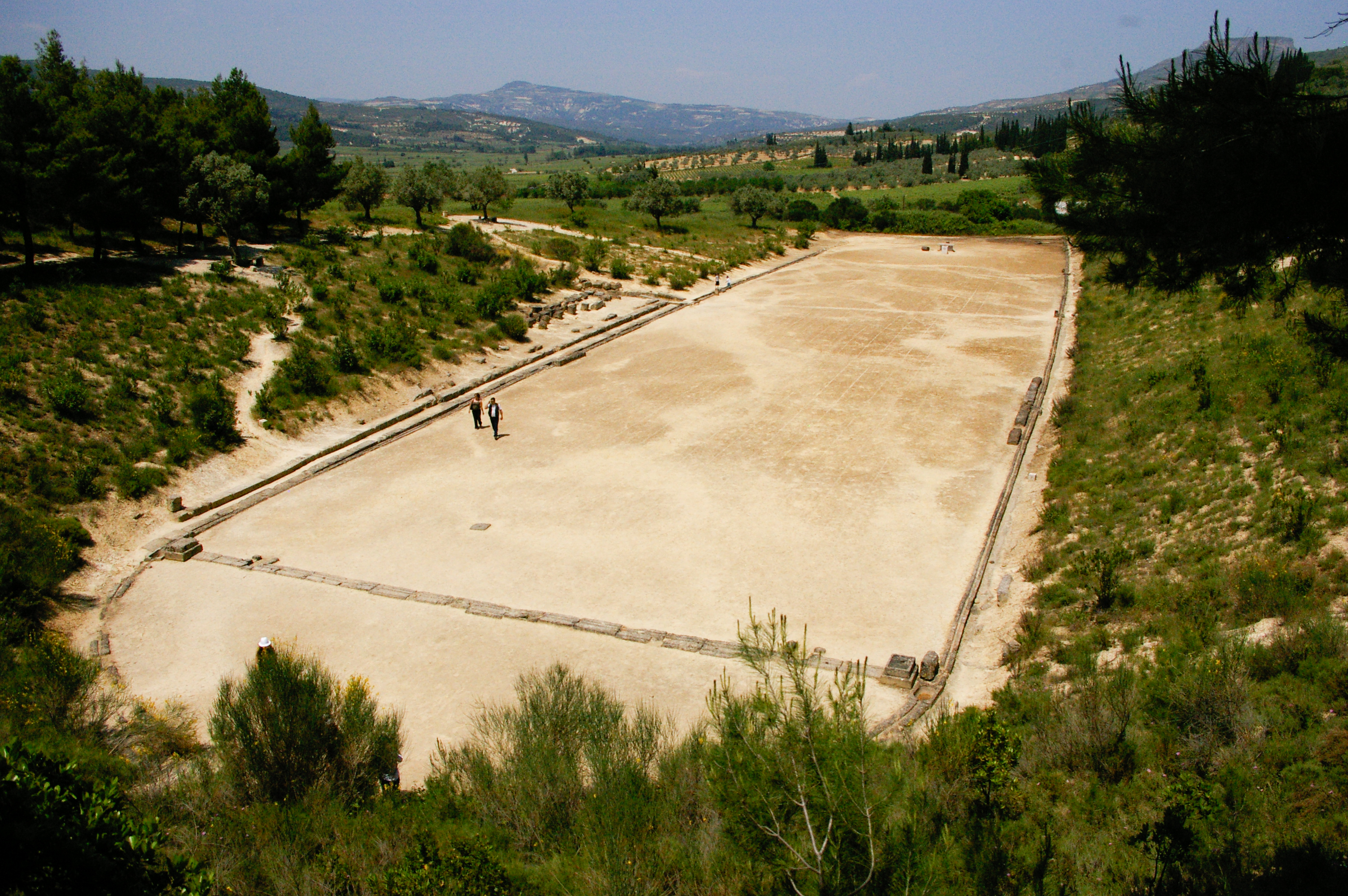
The stadion of Nemea.

The Nemean Games (Ancient Greek: Νέμεα or Νέμεια) were one of the four Panhellenic Games of Ancient Greece, and were held at Nemea every two years (or every third).

With the Isthmian Games, the Nemean Games were held both the year before and the year after the Ancient Olympic Games and the Pythian Games in the third year of the Olympiad cycle. Like the Olympic Games, they were held in honour of Zeus. They were said to have been founded by Heracles after he defeated the Nemean lion; another myth said that they originated as the funeral games of a child named Opheltes. However, they are known to have existed only since the 6th century BC (from 573 BC, or earlier). The winners received a wreath of wild celery leaves from the city of Argos.

== History ==
The various legends concerning its origin are related in the argumenta of the scholiasts to the Nemea of Pindar, with which may be compared Pausanias, and Apollodorus. All these legends, however, agree in stating that the Nemean Games were originally instituted by the Seven against Thebes in commemoration of the death of Opheltes, later called Archemorus. When the Seven arrived at Nemea and were very thirsty, they met Hypsipile, who was carrying Opheltes (Greek: Ὀφέλτης), the child of the priest of Zeus and of a queen named Eurydice. While his nurse Hypsipyle showed the heroes the way to the nearest well, she left the child behind lying in a meadow, which during her absence was killed by a dragon. When the Seven on their return saw the accident, they slew the dragon and instituted funeral games to be held every third year. Other legends attribute the institution of the Nemean Games to Heracles, after he had slain the Nemean lion. The alternative tradition was that he had either revived the ancient games, or at least introduced the alteration by which they were from this time celebrated in honor of Zeus.

Pindar stated that the games were afterwards celebrated in honor of Zeus. Initially, the games were warlike in character and only warriors and their sons were allowed to take part in them. Later on, however, they were thrown open to all the Greeks. The games took place in a grove between Cleonae and Phlius. The various events, according to Apollodorus, were horse-racing, running in armour in the stadium, wrestling, chariot racing and discus, boxing, spear-throwing and archery, as well as musical contests. The prize given to the victors was originally a wreath of olive branches, but afterwards a wreath of green celery. The location of the Nemean Games varied at different times among Cleonae, Corinth, and Argos. They were sometimes called the Cleonaean Games after the first location. The judges who awarded the prizes were dressed in black robes, and an instance of their justice, when the Argives presided, is recorded by Pausanias.

Regarding the time of year the Nemean Games were celebrated, the scholiast on Pindar merely states that they were held on the 12th of the month of Panemos, though in another passage he makes a statement which contradicts this assertion. Pausanias speaks of winter Nemean Games, and distinguishes them from others which were held in summer. It seems that for a time the celebration of the Nemean Games was neglected, and that they were revived in Olympiad 51.4 (573 BC), from which time Eusebius dates the first Nemead. Henceforth, they were for a long time celebrated regularly twice in every Olympiad, both at the start of every second Olympic year in the winter, and soon after the start of every fourth Olympic year in the summer. About the time of the Battle of Marathon it became customary in Argolis to reckon according to Nemeads.

The Hellenistic Stadion (with a vaulted entrance tunnel dated to about 320 BC, according to Stephen G. Miller, 2001, pp. 90–93) has recently been discovered. The Games, under Macedonian control, returned to Nemea at the end of the 4th century BC. In 208 BC, Philip of Macedonia was honored by the Argives with the presidency at the Nemean games, and Quintius Flamininus proclaimed at the Nemean Games the freedom of the Argives. The emperor Hadrian restored the horse-racing of boys at the Nemean Games, which had fallen into disuse. But after his time they do not seem to have been much longer celebrated, as they are no longer mentioned by any of the writers of the subsequent period.

== The program of the Nemean Games ==
=== The Gymnic Part ===
The participants to these parts competed in the nude.

- The Stadion – A foot race which was about 178 meters at Nemea.
- The Diaulos – Twice the Stadion foot race, about 355 meters at Nemea.
- The Hippios – Twice the Diaulos foot race, about 710 meters at Nemea.
- The Dolichos – A long distance running race. The exact length of this race is uncertain; it could have been 7, 10, 20 or 24 times round the stadium.
- The Hoplitodromos – A Diaulos foot race with the competitors wearing helmets, a bronze covered aspis and initially metal greaves.
- The Pyx – A boxing-like contest. In order to protect themselves and to do more damage the opponents bound their hands and wrists with long leather strips. The first to be knocked out or to acknowledge defeat would lose.
- The Pankration – A blend of boxing and wrestling with very few rules. Again, the first to be knocked out or to acknowledge defeat would lose.
- The Pale – Wrestling from an upright position. The goal was to throw the opponent on the ground three times.
- The Pentathlon – This pentathlon consisted of the stadion, a game of wrestling or pale, javelin-throwing, discus-throwing and long-jump.

=== The equestrian part ===
Taking place in a hippodrome, these were the only events where women could take part, not because they were allowed to ride, but because it was the owner of a horse or chariot rather than the rider or charioteer who was considered the victor. This even allowed cities to participate by funding equestrian teams.

So far no ancient hippodrome has been recovered, so the given lengths are assumptions.

- The Tethrippon chariots, with four horses racing a distance of 8400 meters or 5.25 miles.
- The Synoris chariots, with two horses racing a distance of 5600 meters or 3.5 miles.
- The Kélēs, a horseback race over a distance of 4200 meters or 2.5 miles.

== Modern Nemean Games re-enactment ==
The Society for the Revival of the Nemean Games was founded in 1994, after more than 20 years of archaeological excavation at Nemea. The contemporary games are more of a re-enactment than an actual sporting event, held every four years since 1996, are a form of popular education in history, as well as a counter to the commercialism of the modern Olympics. Races are organized according to age and gender, open to international participation. No medals are awarded, only crowns of palm branches and wild celery.

In 2008, some 600 people clad in tunics raced barefoot in the ruins of the ancient stadium on 21 June. Two races were staged for the runners aged from 10 to 80, one of 100 metres (110 yards) and the other of 7.5 kilometres (4.7 mi). The most striking feature of this attempt was the revival of the Hoplitodromos race.

The last Nemead took place between June 28 and 30, 2024.

== See also ==
- Stadium at Nemea
- Nemean Baths
