= Polyphontes =

Greek mythological figure

In Greek mythology, Polyphontes (Ancient Greek: Πολυφόντης) was the son of Autophonus, a warrior who figured in Polynices' war to regain the throne of Thebes from his brother, Eteocles.

== Mythology ==
Polyphontes was mentioned in Book IV of the Iliad, when Agamemnon reminds Diomedes of the deeds of his father Tydeus. In Agamemnon's story, Tydeus was an ally of Polynices. He entered Thebes, and challenged and defeated all the Theban leaders. Eteocles then sent Polyphontes and Maion with fifty men to ambush Tydeus on his way back to his army, but Tydeus killed all of them except Maion. In some translations the name is given as Lycophontes.

In Aeschylus' play Seven Against Thebes, however, Polyphontes is one of the seven Theban defenders who face the Argive champions at Thebes' gates. He faces Capaneus at the Electran gates.
