= Stadium at Nemea =

Ancient Greek sports venue in Nemea, Corinthia, Greece

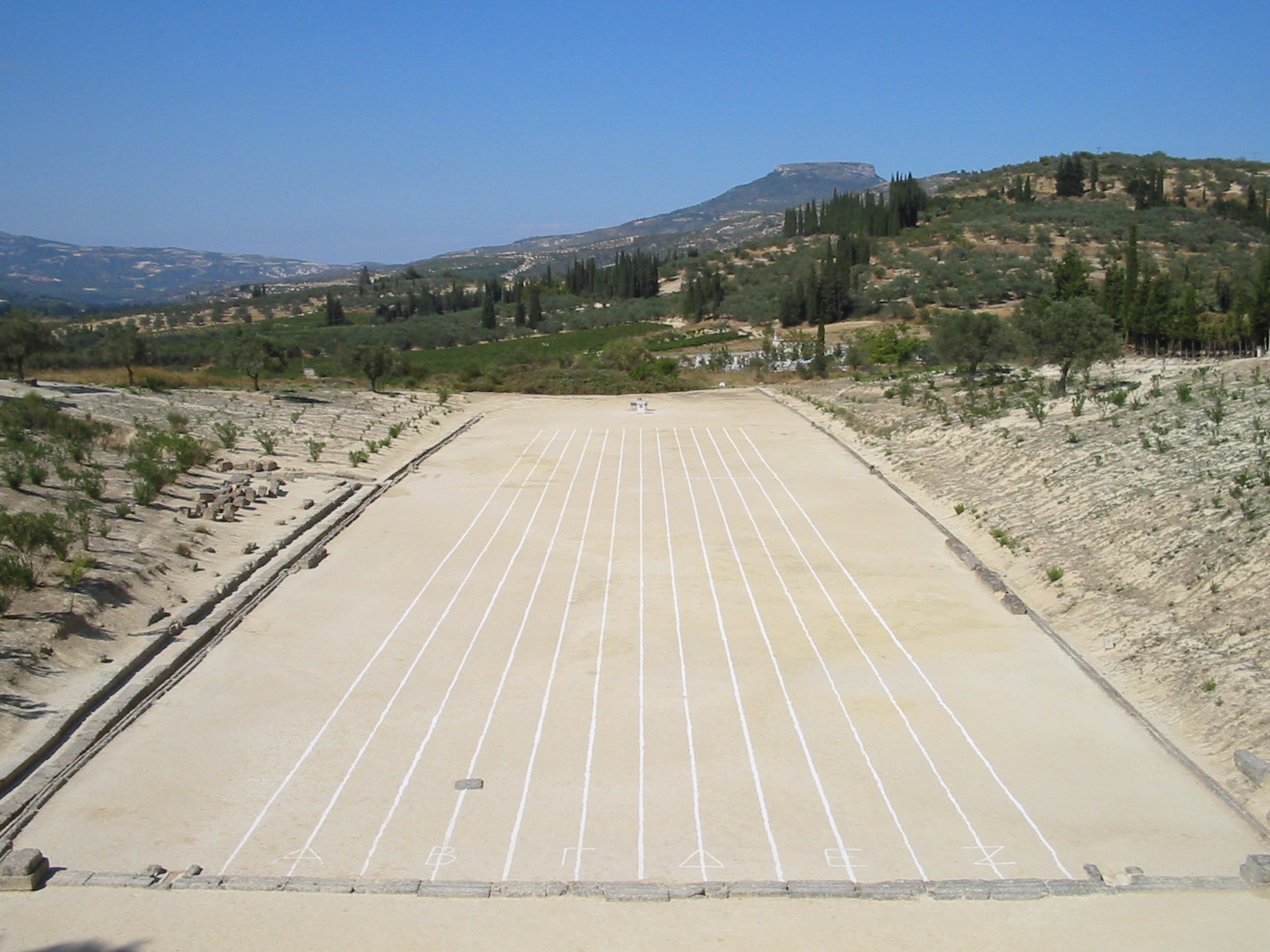
Nemea Stadium seen today

The Stadium at Nemea (Greek: Νεμέα στάδιον) sits on the ancient site of Nemea in the modern day region of Corinthia. Here, ancient Greek athletes participated in the stadion only meters away from the Temple of Zeus. The Nemea Stadium played a big part in the ancient Olympics.

== Excavation ==
In 1964, during an excavation by Charles K. Williams II, archaeologists discovered a rectangular stone across the front of the stadium. This is thought to be the starting line. There is minimum wear to the object other than several marks on the top, which David Gilman Romano says are explained by “[the stadium’s] later use as a threshold.” Also appearing on the block is a single character, an epsilon (ɛ). Though the form of the epsilon is not archaic, it is hard to tell whether or not it is part of the original use of the starting line or not.

== Athletics ==
Nemea Stadium played a major role in Greek athletics. The stadion, or running event, was held here. The stadion was named after the building it took place in. The Nemea Stadium is actually a Latin re-write of the word stadion. Between 776 and 724 BC, not only was the stadion the premier event of the Nemean games but it was also the only event. Winners of the stadion race would originally win the entirety of the games.
