= Nemea =

Ancient site in Greece

- Νεμέα (Greek)
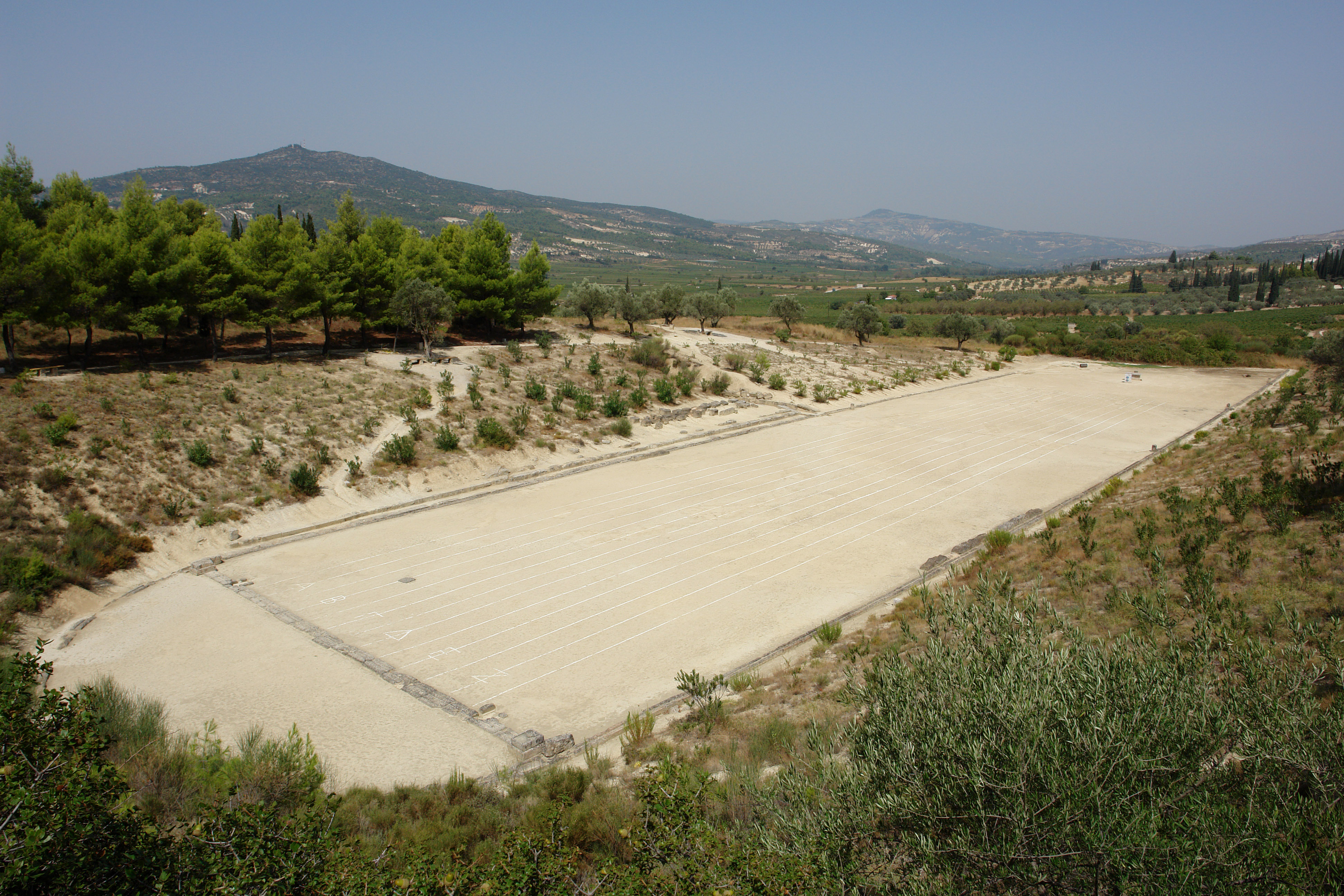
- The Stadium at Nemea

- Location within Greece
- 37°48′32″N 22°42′37″E
- Type: Settlement
- Location: Archaia Nemea, Corinthia, Greece
- Region: Argolis (ancient Greece)

History
- Event: Battle of Nemea

Nemea (/ˈniːmiə/; Ancient Greek: Νεμέα; Ionic Greek: Νεμέη) was an ancient sanctuary in the northeastern Peloponnese, today in the regional unit of Corinthia, Greece. Formerly part of the territory of Cleonae in ancient Argolis, its location on neutral ground on the borders of ancient Archaia, Arcadia, Argolis and Corinth was ideal for the creation of a panhellenic religious centre and one of the four prestigious Panhellenic games along with Delphi, Isthmia and Olympia. The Nemean Games were celebrated in the eleven Nemean odes in the 4th book of Epinikia of Pindar dating from 476 BC.

The small village of Archaia Nemea (formerly known as "Iraklion") is immediately southwest of the archaeological site, while the new town of Nemea lies to the west.

== Myth, legend and history ==
Plan of Nemea A: sanctuary B: Hellenistic stadium

Plan of Nemea 1 temple of Zeus, 2 altar of Zeus, 3 Oikoi, 6 baths, 7 Heroon of Epheltes, 10 Early stadium, 15 stadium

In Greek mythology, Nemea was ruled by king Lycurgus and queen Eurydice. Nemea was famous in Greek myth as the home of the Nemean Lion, which was killed by the hero Heracles, and as the place where the infant Opheltes, lying on a bed of parsley, was killed by a serpent while his nurse Hypsipyle fetched water for the Seven against Thebes on their way from Argos to Thebes. The Seven founded the Nemean Games in his memory, according to its aition, or founding myth, accounting for the crown of victory being made of parsley or the wild form of celery and for the black robes of the judges, interpreted as a sign of mourning.

=== History ===
The near area was wealthy in the Bronze Age as shown by the rich Mycenaean tombs found in the Nemea valley dating from the 16th c. BC at Ayia Sotira, Barnavos and Aidonia, many finds from which are in the Nemea museum. An early Bronze Age village was also built on nearby Tsoungiza Hill.

The Nemean Games were documented from 573 BC, or earlier, at the sanctuary of Zeus at Nemea. The original stadium was located near to the temple. The Games were held every two years in July. Greeks gathered for the celebration and a sacred truce was declared to suspend all wars and hostilities for a month in advance so athletes could travel here.

In 394 BC the Battle of the Nemea River was fought nearby.

In 330 BC, the games returned to Nemea. At that time Argos constructed great new monuments including the Temple of Zeus and several other buildings. A new stadium was built further away from the temple, uniquely accessed by the athletes via a tunnel that still survives.

== Rediscovery ==
Pausanias described the site on his visit at the end of the 2nd c. AD: at the temenos the grave of Opheltes was surrounded by open-air altars and enclosed within a stone wall. In his time the temple, which he noted was "worth seeing", stood in a grove of cypresses; its roof had fallen in and there was no cult image within the temple.

The site was excavated in annual campaigns since 1973: many buildings including the great open-air altar, baths, and ancient accommodation for visitors have been unearthed.

The material discovered in the excavations is on display in an on-site museum constructed as a part of the University of California's excavations.

In 2018, archaeologists discovered a large, intact tomb dating to the early Mycenaean era (1650–1400 BC).

== The site ==
=== Temple of Zeus ===
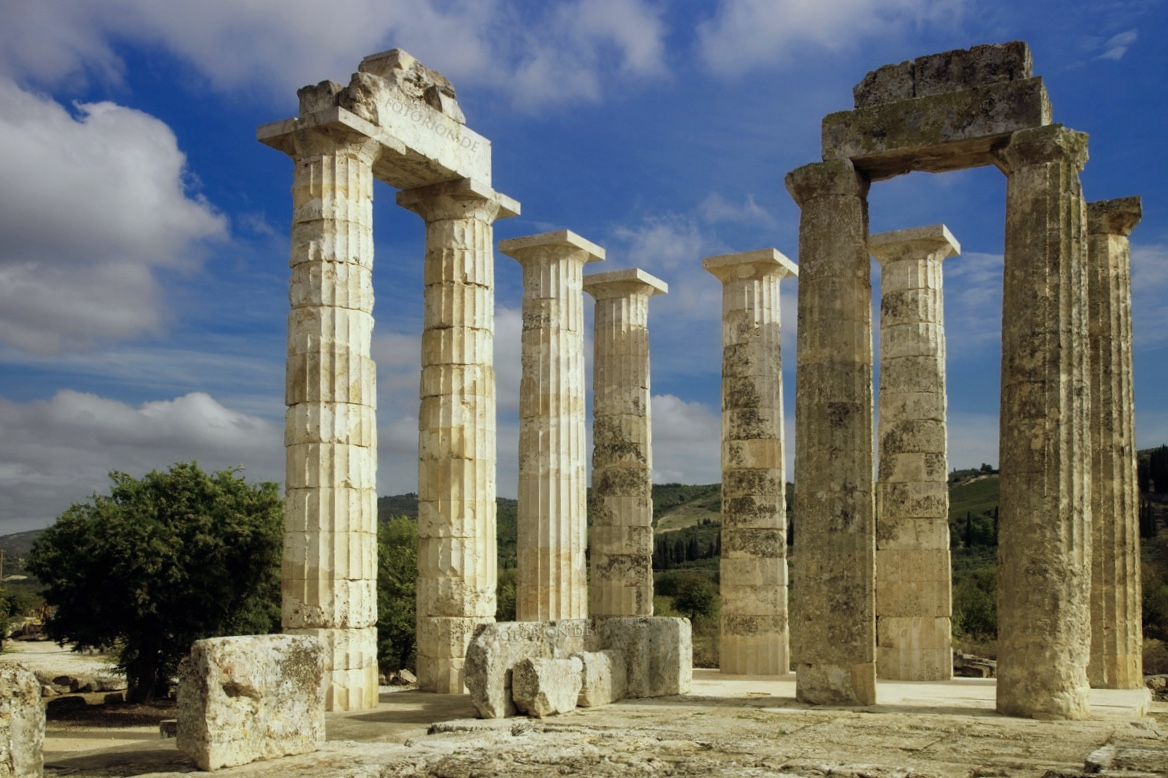
Temple of Zeus

The temple is located within a large sacred area with many buildings and features. The remains today date to the 4th century BC (~330 BC) but the temple was built on top of an earlier version of the 6th century BC destroyed by fire, of which only a foundation wall is visible.

Three orders of architecture, Doric, Corinthian, and Ionic, were employed in this temple which dates from the end of the Classical period and presages other developments of Hellenistic architecture, such as the slenderness (a height of 6.34 column diameters) of the Doric columns of the exterior. The finished Temple had no sculpted decoration.

It had 32 limestone (6x12) columns along the perimeter, three of which have stood since their construction. Two more columns were reconstructed in 2002 and four more since.

=== Hellenistic stadium ===
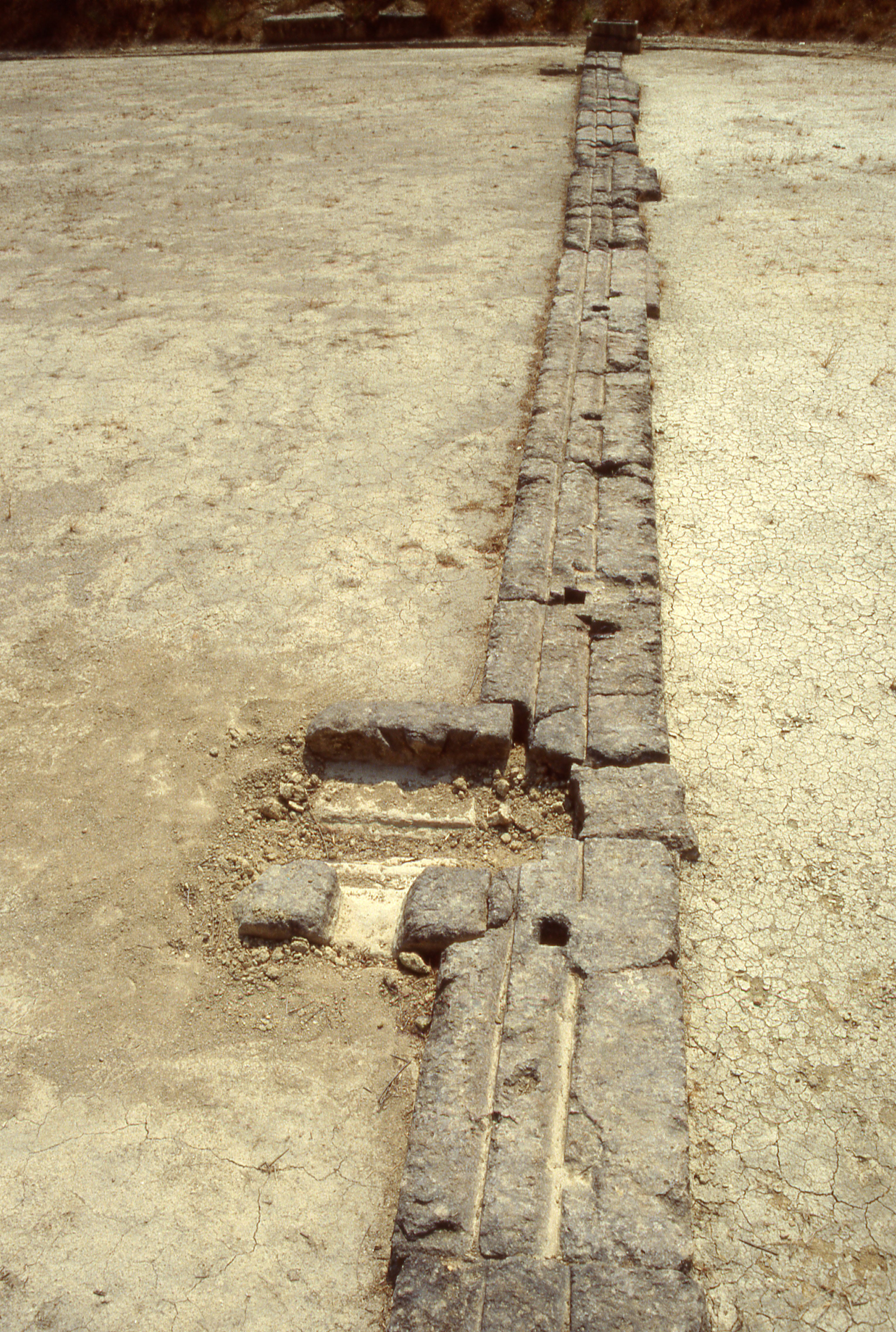
starting blocks

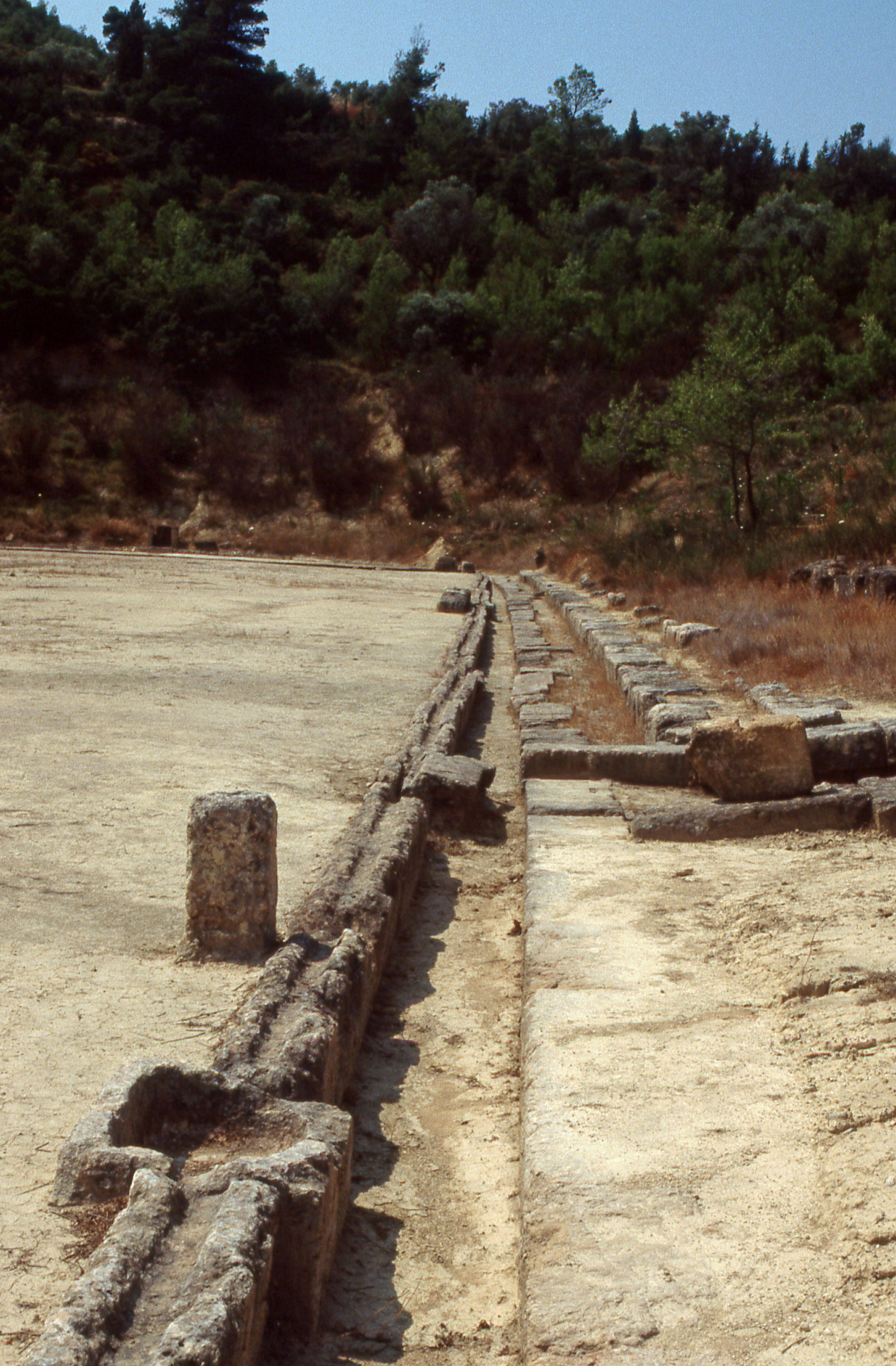
Stadium W side with water channel

The stadium was built in a natural hollow between two ridges for the surrounding embankments for seating. The track originally was 600 feet long. The sides of the track still have a stone water channel with water basins fed originally from a spring, for the athletes. Some stone seats were found but most spectators would have sat on the earth embankments.

The stone starting blocks with grooves for runners toes are still in place and include holes for a hysplex starting mechanism to give accurate starts to races.

The apodyteirion (changing room), a rectangular building with a surrounding portico, where the athletes prepared for the games was built in an adjacent natural depression east of the Stadium. The apodyterion has stamps on the roof-tiles that reveal the architect's name, Sosikles. To link this with the stadium the 36 m long barrel-vaulted tunnel was built for the athletes to pass through, something unique for Greek stadia and the earliest ancient Greek vault known. On the walls of the tunnel are ancient graffiti including the name "Telestas", a known ancient Olympic victor.

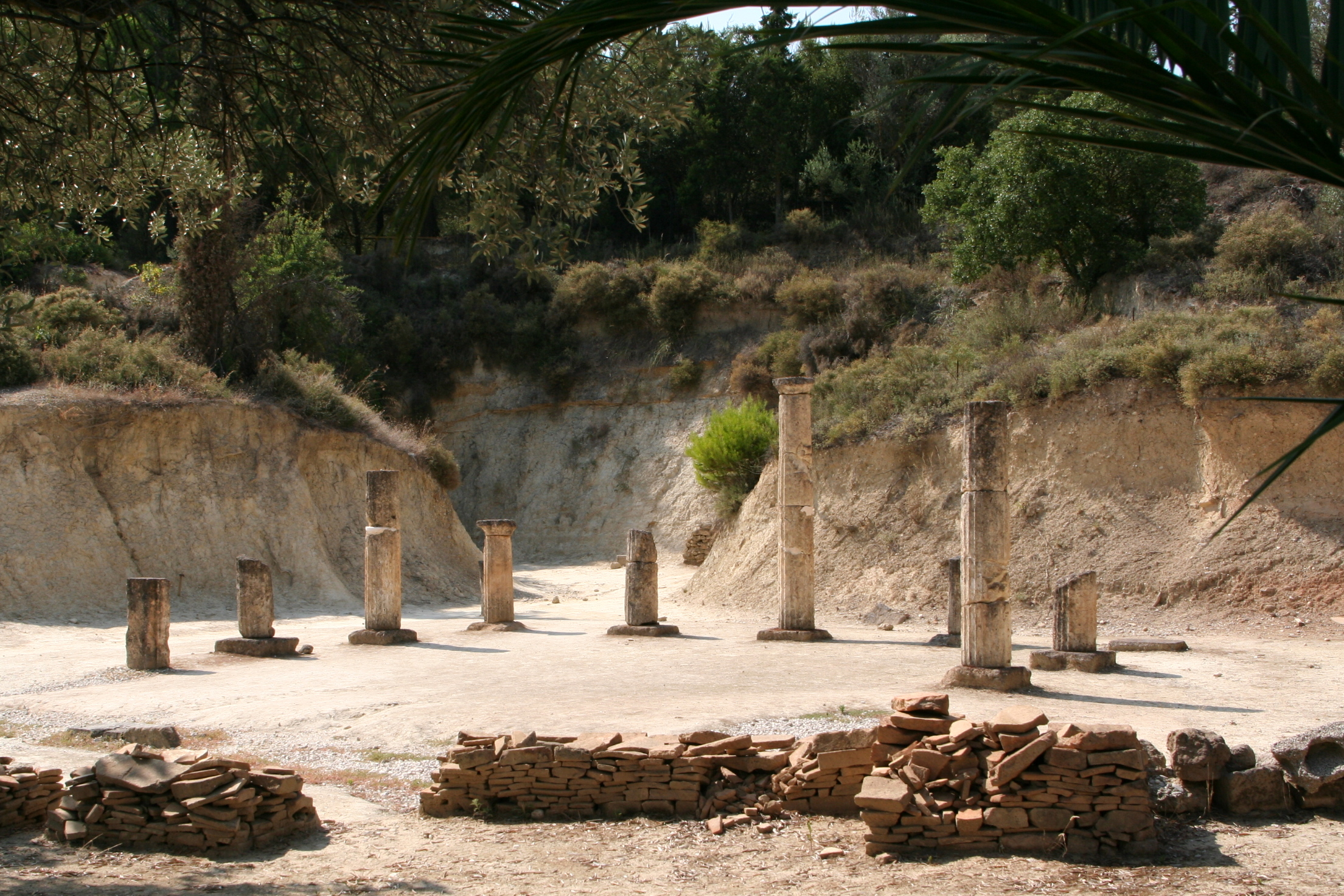
The apodyterium near the stadion

Also found were two black marble bases that may have been where statues of victors of the games stood.

=== Oikoi ===
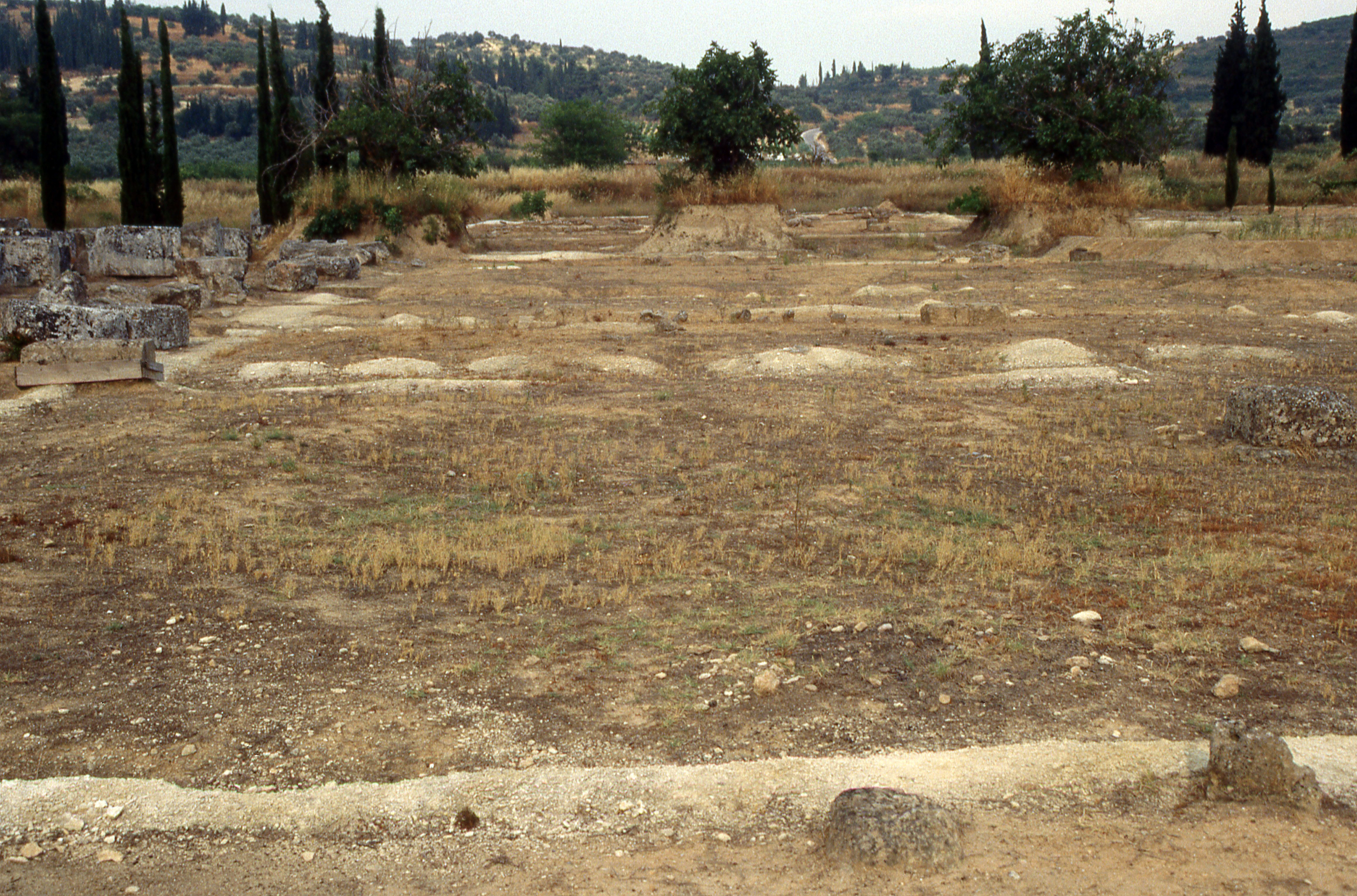
Remains of the first oikos

South of the Temple of Zeus, there are nine poorly preserved buildings, now commonly called oikoi. The Greek word oikos, usually meaning “house”, is used since the purpose of these buildings is unclear. These buildings face north along an east–west line and resemble the position of the treasuries at Olympia, and possibly served a similar purpose as both a treasury and meeting hall, as at Delos.

The fourth, fifth, and sixth oikos have been dated to the first half of the 5th century BC, following the Persian Wars, which suggest a general date for the others. The first oikoi were discovered during the 1920s but were not completely excavated until the 1970s. Farming activity and robbing of the building materials in the post-classical period has caused extensive damage to the site, so that only the limestone foundations of the oikoi remain.

The first oikos is the largest and measures 22.40 x 13.15 m. It lies just east of the modern path to the Temple of Zeus. The eighth oikos, which is located much farther east, features a well in its back room that could have been used in association with preparing and eating meals. It was later remodeled as a bronze sculpting workshop. The ninth oikos was used as a cooking area for the conjoined dining establishment but suffered early destruction. The dining establishment connected to the eighth and ninth oikos measured 9.82 x 7.44 m and had a sacrificial pit 6.20 m west of it. The establishment allowed up to eleven dining couches and the ash and pig bones located in the pit suggest the use of ritual dining. Located just southwest of the dining establishment, there were four kilns that used to produce roof tiles most likely during the later years of the 4th century BC when the site was renovated with funding from the Macedonian kings.

=== Aqueduct ===
A 1km-long aqueduct fed the baths from a spring via a vaulted tunnel. It used special tapered u-shaped tiles covered with roof tiles and is still visible near the baths.

== See also ==
- List of ancient Greek cities
- Heroon at Nemea
- Nemean Baths
- Stadium at Nemea
