= Antigone (mythology) =

Female character in Greek mythology

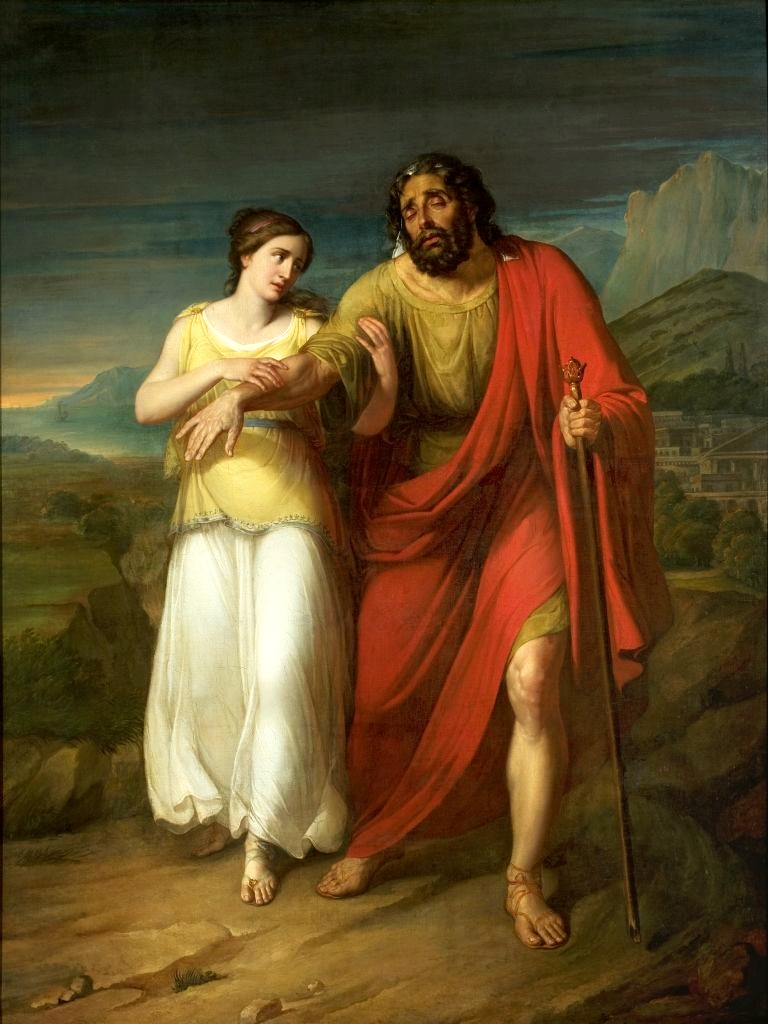
Oedipus and his daughter Antigone

In Greek mythology, Antigona or Antigone (/ænˈtɪɡəni/ ann-TIG-ə-nee; Ancient Greek: Ἀντιγόνη meaning 'worthy of one's parents' or 'in place of one's parents') was the name of the following figures:

- Antigone, daughter of Oedipus.
- Antigone, daughter of Eurytion and first wife of Peleus.
- Antigone, daughter of Laomedon.
- Antigona, the Pheraean princess as the daughter of King Pheres and Clymene (or Periclymene) and thus, the sister of Admetus, Lycurgus, Eidomene and Periopis. Later on, she married Cometes of Peirasia and became the mother of Asterion, one of the Argonauts.
