= Herakles (Euripides) =

Ancient Greek tragedy by Euripides

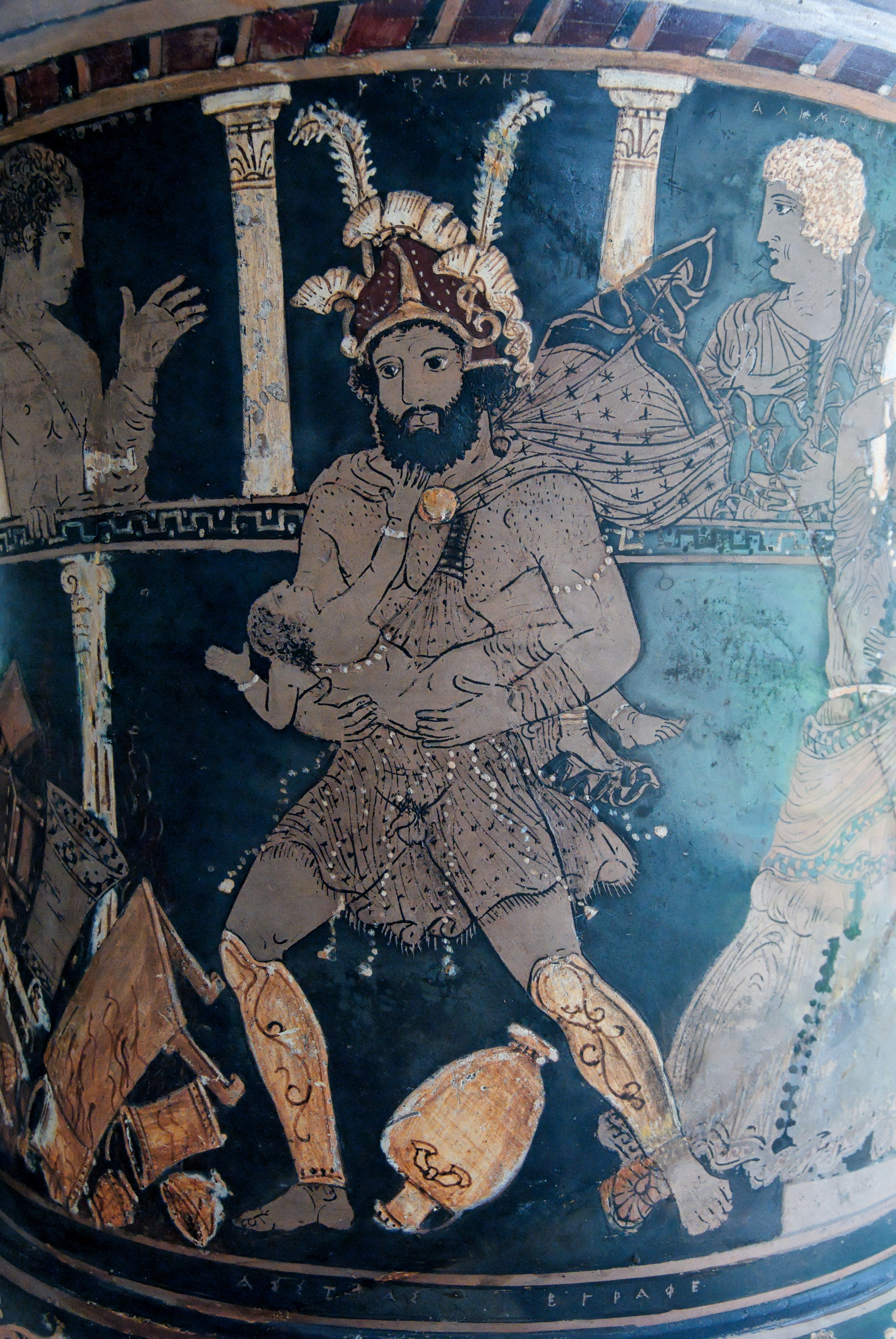
- The Madness of Herakles by Asteas
- Written by: Euripides
- Chorus: Old Men of Thebes
- Characters: Amphitryon; Megara; Heracles' Children; Lycus; Iris; Madness; Heracles; Theseus
- Original language: Ancient Greek
- Genre: Tragedy
- Setting: Before the palace of Heracles at Thebes

Premiere
- Place premiered: Athens

Herakles (Ancient Greek: Ἡρακλῆς μαινόμενος, Hēraklēs Mainomenos, also known as Hercules Furens and sometimes written as Heracles) is an Athenian tragedy by Euripides that was first performed c. 416 BC. While Heracles is in the underworld obtaining Cerberus for one of his labours, his father Amphitryon, wife Megara, and children are sentenced to death in Thebes by Lycus. Heracles arrives in time to save them, though the goddesses Iris and Madness (personified) cause him to kill his wife and children in a frenzy. It is the second of two surviving tragedies by Euripides where the family of Heracles are suppliants (the first being Children of Heracles). It was first performed at the City Dionysia festival.

== Characters ==
- Amphitryon – Husband of Heracles' mother
- Megara – Wife of Heracles
- Lycus – Usurper of the throne of Thebes
- Iris – Messenger of the gods
- Lyssa – Madness
- Heracles
- Messenger – Servant from the court of Heracles
- Theseus – King of Athens
- Chorus of old men of Thebes

== Plot synopsis ==
In a prologue filled with genealogical detail, Amphitryon outlines the ancestral history of Heracles' and Lycus' families. Lycus is ruling Thebes unlawfully and is about to kill Amphitryon, and—because Megara is the daughter of the lawful king Creon—Herakles' wife Megara and their children. Heracles cannot help his family, for he is in Hades engaged in the last of his twelve labours: bringing back the monster Cerberus who guards the gates there. The family has taken refuge at the altar of Zeus; they are forbidden to enter their palace and are watched too closely to escape.

The Chorus sympathize with them and encourage them, but, being old men, are unable to help. Lycus comes to ask how long they are going to try to prolong their lives by clinging to the altar. He claims that Heracles has been killed in Hades and will never help them. He justifies the proposed slaughter, claiming that Heracles' children will attempt to avenge their grandfather, Creon, by killing Lycus when they grow up. He depreciates the deeds of Heracles, calling him a coward for using a bow instead of a spear. Amphitryon, point by point, argues the other side and asks permission for them to go into exile. Lycus declares that he is through with words and orders his men to bring logs, stack them around the altar, and burn the suppliants alive.

Megara refuses to be burned alive: that is a coward's death. She has given up hope for Heracles' return and gets permission from Lycus to dress the children in robes of death to face their executioners. The old men of the Chorus have stoutly defended Heracles' family, but, because of their age, can do little more than disagree with Lycus and sing in praise of Heracles' famous labours.

Megara returns with the children, dressed for death. She tells of the kingdoms Heracles had planned to give each of them and of the brides she intended them to marry. As Amphitryon laments the futility of the life he has lived, Megara catches sight of Heracles approaching. When Heracles hears the story of Creon's overthrow and Lycus' plan to kill Megara and the children, he resolves upon revenge. He tells them the reason for his long absence is that in addition to bringing Cerberus back from Hades and imprisoning him, he also brought back Theseus, who is now on his way to his home in Athens. With the children clinging to his robes, he goes into the palace with Megara.

Lycus returns and, impatient at finding only Amphitryon ready, storms into the palace to get the others. He is met inside by Heracles, and killed. The Chorus sing a joyful song of celebration, but it is interrupted by the appearance of Iris and Madness, hovering over the house.

Iris announces that she has come to make Heracles kill his own children by driving him mad. Hera, Zeus' wife, is behind the plan: she has hated Heracles since birth because Zeus was his father. She also resents his god-like strength and wants to humble him.

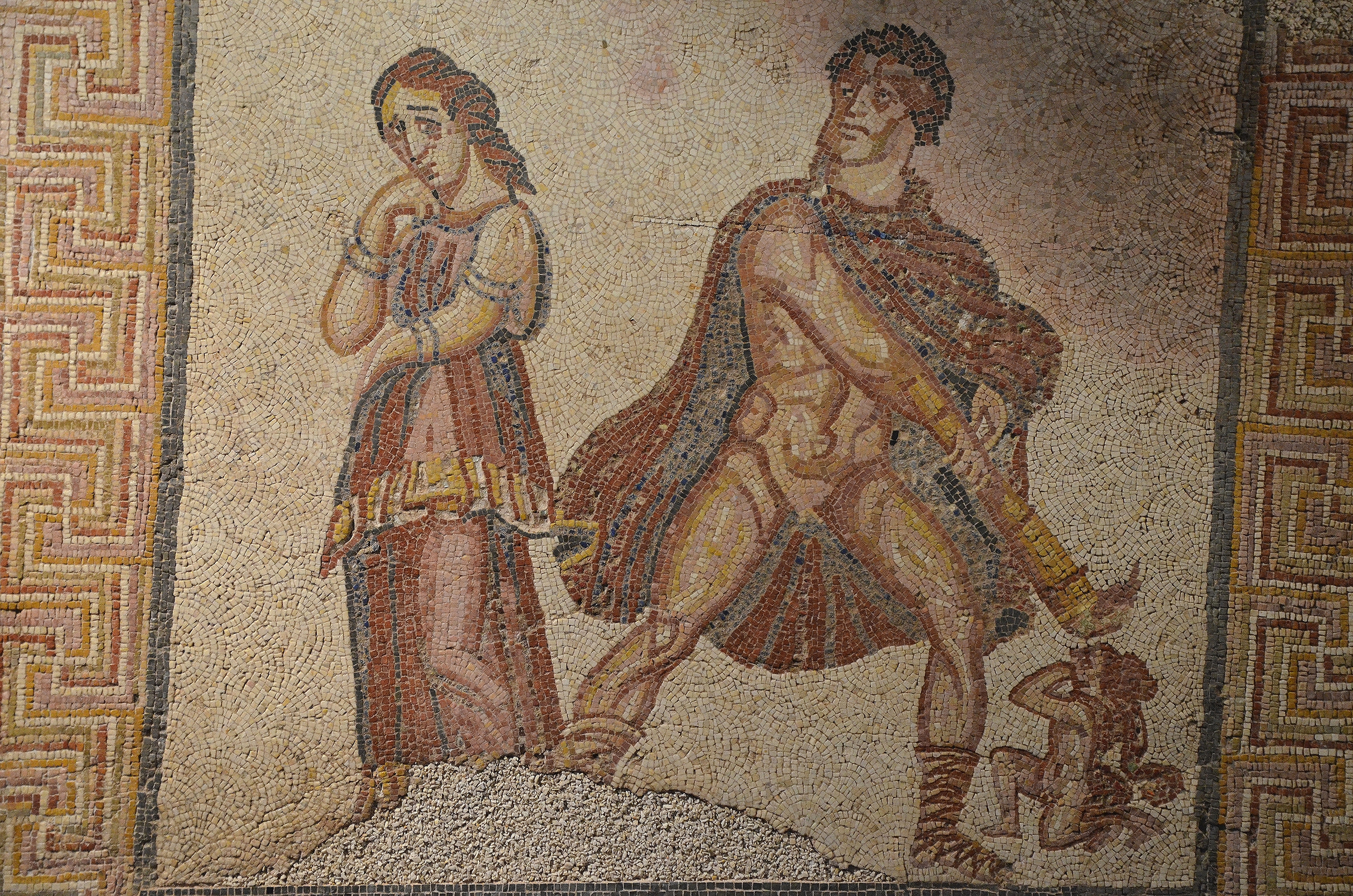
Heracles kills his son while Megara stands by

A Messenger reports that when the fit of madness fell on Heracles, he believed he had to kill Eurystheus, the king who assigned his labours. Moving from room to room, he fancied that he was going from country to country. When Amphitryon tried to stop him, he thought it was Eurystheus, and his own children those of Eurystheus. In his madness he killed his three sons and his wife. When he threatened Amphitryon, Athena struck him and he fell asleep. The palace doors are opened to reveal Heracles, now asleep and tied to a pillar, surrounded by the bodies of his wife and children. When he wakes up, Amphitryon tells him what he has done; in his shame he wants to die by suicide.

Theseus, king of Athens, whom Heracles had freed from Hades, arrives; he has heard that Lycus had overthrown Creon and desires to help overthrow Lycus. When he hears what Heracles has done, he asks him to uncover his head. Friendship, Theseus says, is greater than any fear he has of pollution from someone guilty of kindred bloodshed. Heracles, not easily comforted, says he can be welcome to no man; it would be better for him to die by suicide. Theseus offers him hospitality in Athens and half his wealth. He argues that even the gods commit evil acts, such as forbidden marriages, yet continue to live on Olympus and face out their crimes. Why shouldn't Heracles? Heracles vehemently denies this line of argument: such stories of the gods, he says, are merely the inventions of poets. A deity, if really such, can have no desires. Finally convinced that it would be cowardly to die by suicide, he resolves to go to Athens with Theseus. The law forbids him to remain in Thebes or even attend the funeral of his wife and children. He asks his father to bury his dead, and, leaning on Theseus, leaves.

== Themes ==
Ambiguity: Euripides' play Heracles asks more questions than it answers. Nowhere is this more apparent than in the topic of faith. During Euripides' time, though most Greeks, like Euripides' Theseus, would have been believers, there is a strain of thinkers who questioned traditional religion and the existence of the gods, much as Heracles does in the play. The play shows the story of how Heracles suffers the ignominy of killing his family. As is typical of an ancient Greek tragedy, the gods have a large hand in it. Hera hates Heracles because he is a living reminder of her husband's infidelity. Because of this she is cruel to him. She could bring about Herakles' death but instead she wants him to suffer. She sends Madness to drive Heracles to murder his wife and progeny. Madness herself sees the irrationality and senselessness in Hera's vengeance. The story, it seems, does an odd job of explaining the faith that the mainstream culture has. Heracles does not believe but has been to Hades and has seen the dog Cerberus and the dead souls of others. Despite evidence of the divine, he chooses to believe, much as Socrates does also, that the gods, as they are commonly believed to be, do not exist. This point of view may reflect the playwright's own. Even if it does not, it does reflect a viewpoint of Euripides' own time that is asking for more from the morality of its religion.

Dichotomy: Euripides' Heracles is a tragedy full of instances of dichotomies, as seen in its characters, events, and themes. Characters in the play stand on opposite ends of one another in terms of ideology and characteristics, creating a dichotomy between them. One example is found in Megara and Amphitryon. When confronted with their deaths and the deaths of Heracles's sons, the two have very different reactions. Megara accepts the fact that she and her children are going to die. Amphitryon, however, continues to hope that his son Heracles will return to save them. Together Megara and Amphitryon form a dichotomy of hope and defeat. Another example of a dichotomy between two characters is between Heracles himself and Lykos. Heracles is known as the most courageous man in Greece; and Lykos accuses him of cowardice. Yet Lykos is attempting to execute Megara and her children out of fear of something they might do. The actions of Heracles and Lykos show that they stand on opposite sides of the spectrum, with Heracles standing with courage and Lykos with cowardice. Furthermore, a dichotomy resides within Heracles. In his returning from the Underworld with Theseus Heracles saves his friend and creates life. In his murdering of his own family after being driven insane, Heracles completes the dichotomy by bringing about death. Finally, there is the theme of the gods' existence and the dichotomy of belief in the characters in the play. After killing his family, Heracles exclaims that the gods do not exist, while others, especially Theseus, argue the opposite. All of these dichotomies come together to create a play that is used more to ask and generate questions and all reflect the current concerns about the belief systems in play during our playwright's time.

Hope (Ἐλπίς): Euripides' Heracles is a play which is open to many different interpretations. Perhaps the greatest theme within the play is that of hope. Hope plays a central role from the play's start until its end. At the start the family of Heracles is in danger of being killed by Lykos and is without the protection of Heracles who is engaged in serving Eurystheus and completing his labors. The salvation of the family rests upon Heracles coming to rescue them. Megara refuses to accept this threat and although she has the children dressed in robes of death, she still holds out hope for Herakles' arrival. Hope is also what gets Heracles through his 12 acts; furthermore hope is offered to him by Theseus so as to help Heracles get through the pain and suffering he experiences from having mistakenly killed his wife and children. Hope drives this piece of work; giving all those within it the ability to push forward no matter the dreadful circumstances.

Identity: In the play Heracles, Euripides plays with the characterization of his main character, Heracles, and his identity. In lines 1263-1265 and lines 1341-1345 Heracles talks about how Zeus cannot be his father and about how the gods cannot exist because, if they do exist, they must be perfect. If this in fact is true, it means that Heracles himself does not exist because Zeus is his father. It also renders inexplicable his supernatural strength to complete tasks that mere mortals cannot, such as the 12 labors for Eurystheus. This paradox creates both a problem in the plot of the story, as well as a problem with the identity and existence of Euripides' main character. By having Heracles boldly deny the existence of the gods as the Greeks know them, Euripides may be offering his own atheistic beliefs. During his time, the religion of polytheism is still widely accepted though there is an intellectual strain questioning the validity and reliability of everything. By penning this play, Euripides joins this intellectual debate and casts doubt on the divine.

Moral responsibility: In Heracles, Euripides' focus is on Heracles and his moral character. In the play Heracles holds himself to a higher ethical standard than he does the gods. This is shown when Heracles believes that the gods, if they exist, do no wrong. Though driven mad by them, he accepts all blame for the awful act of killing his family. Madness agrees that what the gods have done is wrong, but Heracles does not hold the gods to blame for what happens. Theseus then attempts to reason with Heracles stating that no mortal man can stain what is divine (line 1231) and that Hera is to blame (lines 1312–1313). Theseus even says "how dare you then, mortal that you are, to protest your fate, when the gods do not?" (lines 1320–1321). Theseus attempts to absolve Heracles of any responsibility and to place all fault on the divine. Heracles refuses to agree and holds himself accountable. Heracles goes so far as to say, "ah, all this has no bearing on my grief; but I do not believe that gods commit adultery, or bind each other in chains. I never did believe it; I never shall; nor that one god is tyrant of the rest. If god is truly god, he is perfect, lacking nothing. These are poets' wretched lies" (lines 1340–1346). He believes that the gods are perfect and can do no wrong, so this horrible act that they cause him to fulfill is his own fault not theirs. He is the one that is to blame, almost like a caregiver taking responsibility for the actions of their charge.

Opposites: In myth opposites are often at work. Apollo brings plague, but he also heals; Artemis hunts but also protects animals. Hermes causes chaos by his trickery and also brings about refinement through his invention of the lyre. So is the same the case for Heracles in Euripides' play of the same name. In it Heracles realizes that he is not completely sure that he himself believes his father, Zeus, is real. This doubt causes a lack of identity for him and may be a root cause of his angry and dangerous side. Even though it is Hera that sends Madness to inflict Heracles, it may also be that he is not emotionally sound or stable and this is what causes him to murder his wife and children. This dark and dangerous side of him contrasts with his positive and constructive side that makes the world better by ridding it of monsters. That he does such awful things and is still forgiven reflects a balance that is achieved between his opposing sides. Heracles murders his family and he saves lives. The play in its dichotomous halves shows the inexorable reality of the existence of destructive and constructive forces in its principal hero, Heracles.

Theology: Euripides' Heracles is a tragedy that, while having many attributes of a classic mythological tale, proposes a sequence of events that goes against the chronology of the traditional story's design. In the typical chronology it is only after Heracles saves his family from the death threat against them that they are later murdered by Heracles himself after being cursed by the living embodiment of Madness, sent by Hera. Euripides foregrounds this event, placing it chronologically during the time of Heracles' labors for Eurystheus and makes it the focus of his play. Euripides plays with the traditional chronology because, in its essence, the play challenges the theology of his day. In fifth century Athens there was a theological revolution with intellectuals questioning, challenging, and rewriting the traditional view of the gods. With his play Euripides adds to this debate, mainly through the voice of his main character. After Herakles murders his family, he questions, in a conversation with Theseus, the true nature of the gods and their existence, while at the same time contemplating suicide. This scene not only sheds light on Heracles' angst but also reflects Euripides'. By toying with the traditional plot-line of Herakles' life, Euripides also questions traditional theological beliefs. For the context of Euripides and Greek intellectual thought of his day, see E.R. Dodds, Euripides The Irrationalist (The Classical Review, July 1929).

== Translations ==
- Robert Potter, 1781 - verse: full text
- Edward P. Coleridge, 1891 - prose: full text
- Arthur S. Way, 1912 - verse
- Hugh Owen Meredith, 1937 - verse
- William Arrowsmith, 1956 - verse
- Philip Vellacott, 1963, - prose and verse
- Kenneth McLeish, 1997 - verse
- Tom Sleigh, 2000
- Anne Carson, 2006 - verse (in "Grief Lessons: Four Plays by Euripides"); in "H of H Playbook," a modern translation with interludes inserted between scenes
- George Theodoridis, 2012 - prose: full text
- Ian C. Johnston, 2020 - verse:
