= Alcestis (play) =

Ancient Greek tragedy by Euripides

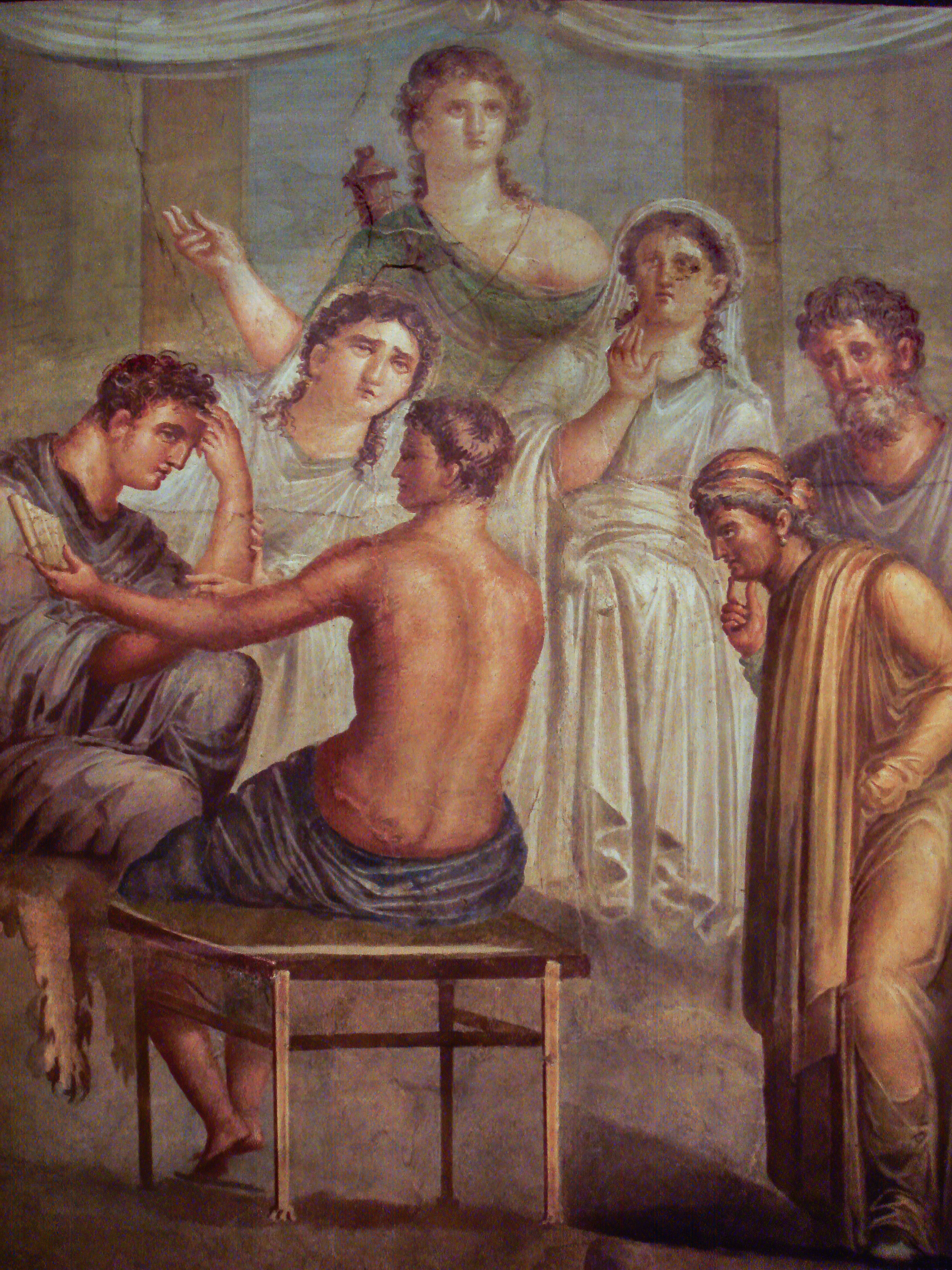
- Alcestis and Admetus; Ancient Roman fresco (45–79 AD)
- Original language: Ancient Greek
- Written by: Euripides
- Chorus: Old men
- Characters: Apollo; Thanatos / Death; Maidservant; Alcestis; Admetus; Eumelus; Heracles; Servant; Pheres
- Genre: Tragedy
- Setting: Pherae in Thessaly

Premiere
- Date: 438 BC
- Place: Athens

Alcestis (/ælˈsɛstɪs/; Ancient Greek: Ἄλκηστις, Alkēstis) is an Athenian tragedy by the ancient Greek playwright Euripides. It was first produced at the City Dionysia festival in 438 BC. Euripides presented it as the final part of a tetralogy of unconnected plays in the competition of tragedies, for which he won second prize; this arrangement was exceptional, as the fourth part was normally a satyr play. Its ambiguous, tragicomic tone—which may be "cheerfully romantic" or "bitterly ironic"—has earned it the label of a "problem play." Alcestis is, possibly excepting the Rhesus, the oldest surviving work by Euripides, although at the time of its first performance he had been producing plays for 17 years.

== Events prior to the start of the play ==
Long before the start of the play, King Admetus was granted by the Fates the privilege of living past the allotted time of his death. The Fates were persuaded to allow this by the god Apollo (who got them drunk). This unusual bargain was struck after Apollo was exiled from Olympus for a year and a day and spent the time in the service of the Thessalian king, a man renowned for his hospitality, who treated Apollo well. Apollo wishes to repay Admetus' hospitality and offers him freedom from death. The gift, however, comes with a price: Admetus must find someone to take his place when Death comes to claim him.

The time of Admetus' death comes and he still has not found a willing substitute. His father, Pheres, is unwilling to step in and thinks that it is ludicrous that he should be asked to give up the life he enjoys so much as part of this strange deal. Finally, Admetus' devoted wife Alcestis agrees to be taken in his place because she wishes not to leave her children fatherless or be bereft of her lover. At the start of the play, she is close to death.

== Synopsis ==
In the play's prologue, the god Apollo comes out from Admetus' palace in Pherae (modern Velestino in Magnesia), dressed in white and carrying his golden bow, with the intention of leaving to avoid becoming stained by the imminent death of Alcestis, who is being comforted within. He offers an exposition of the events leading up to this moment. He hails the arrival of Thanatos (Death), who, dressed in black and carrying a sword, has come to the palace in his role as psychopomp to lead Alcestis to the underworld. Thanatos challenges Apollo's apparent defense of Alcestis and accuses him of "twisting slippery tricks" when he helped Admetus cheat death in the first place. Apollo reassures him and, in a passage of swift stichomythic banter, proposes a postponement of Alcestis' death, which is sarcastically rebuffed. Thanatos concludes, "you may not have what is not yours." Defeated, Apollo leaves angrily, prophesying the arrival of a man (Heracles) who will wrestle Alcestis away from Death. Alone with the audience, Thanatos warns that "this was a god of many words; but words / are not enough," before he summons the doors open with the tip of his sword and slowly enters the palace.

The entry of the chorus, or the "parodos" sequence, follows: a chorus of fifteen men of Pherae, led by a "coryphaeus" (chorus-leader), enter the orchestra of the theatre. The chorus-leader complains that they are in a state of suspense, ignorant of whether they ought to be performing mourning rituals for their queen. The chorus' lyrical ode, to which they dance as they sing, consists of two paired stanzas of strophe and antistrophe. They sing of the silence that greets their search for signs of mourning, the evidence of Alcestis' death. "When goodness dies," they lament, "all good men suffer, too." The chorus-leader concludes by dismissing the chorus' search for hope in the situation: "The King has exhausted every ritual."

[...] Who will deny it?
Is there a higher excellence
than this, that a wife should die her husband's death?
The entire city knows it, and affirms it.
Maidservant (Epeisodion I)

The first episode begins with a maidservant, who enters from the palace in tears. When the chorus-leader presses her for news, she gives a confusing response: "She is alive. And dead." Alcestis stands, she explains, at this moment on the brink of life and death. The chorus-leader anxiously confirms that all of the customary preparations have been made for her proper burial. The maidservant joins the chorus-leader in praising Alcestis' virtue. She narrates a long description of Alcestis' prayers and preparations to die earlier that morning, when Alcestis cried over the bridal bed that will destroy her, embraced her sobbing children, and bade all farewell. She describes how Admetus held Alcestis weeping in his arms while her eyes clung to the sight of the last rays of sun she would see. The maidservant welcomes the chorus-leader to the palace and goes inside to inform Admetus of their arrival.

Alcestis, on her death-bed, requests that in return for her sacrifice, Admetus never again marry, nor forget her or place a resentful stepmother in charge of their children. Admetus agrees to this and also promises to lead a life of solemnity in her honour, abstaining from the merrymaking that was an integral part of his household. Alcestis then dies.

Just afterwards, Admetus' old friend Heracles arrives at the palace, having no idea of the sorrow that has befallen the place. Unwilling to turn a guest away, the king decides not to burden Heracles with the sad news and instructs the servants to make him welcome and to keep their mouths shut. By doing this, Admetus breaks his promise to Alcestis to abstain from merrymaking during the period that follows her death. Heracles gets drunk and begins to irritate the servants, who loved their queen and are bitter at not being allowed to mourn her properly. Finally, one of the servants snaps at the guest and tells him what has happened.

Heracles is deeply embarrassed at his blunder and his bad behaviour and he decides to ambush and confront Death when the funerary sacrifices are made at Alcestis' tomb. When he returns, he brings with him a veiled woman whom he tells Admetus he has won in a competition. He asks his host to take her and look after her while Heracles is away on his labours. After much discussion, he finally forces a reluctant Admetus to take her by the hand, but when he lifts the veil, he finds that it appears to be Alcestis, back from the dead. Heracles has battled Death and forced him to give her up. She cannot speak for three days, after which she will be purified and fully restored to life.

== Critics' commentary ==
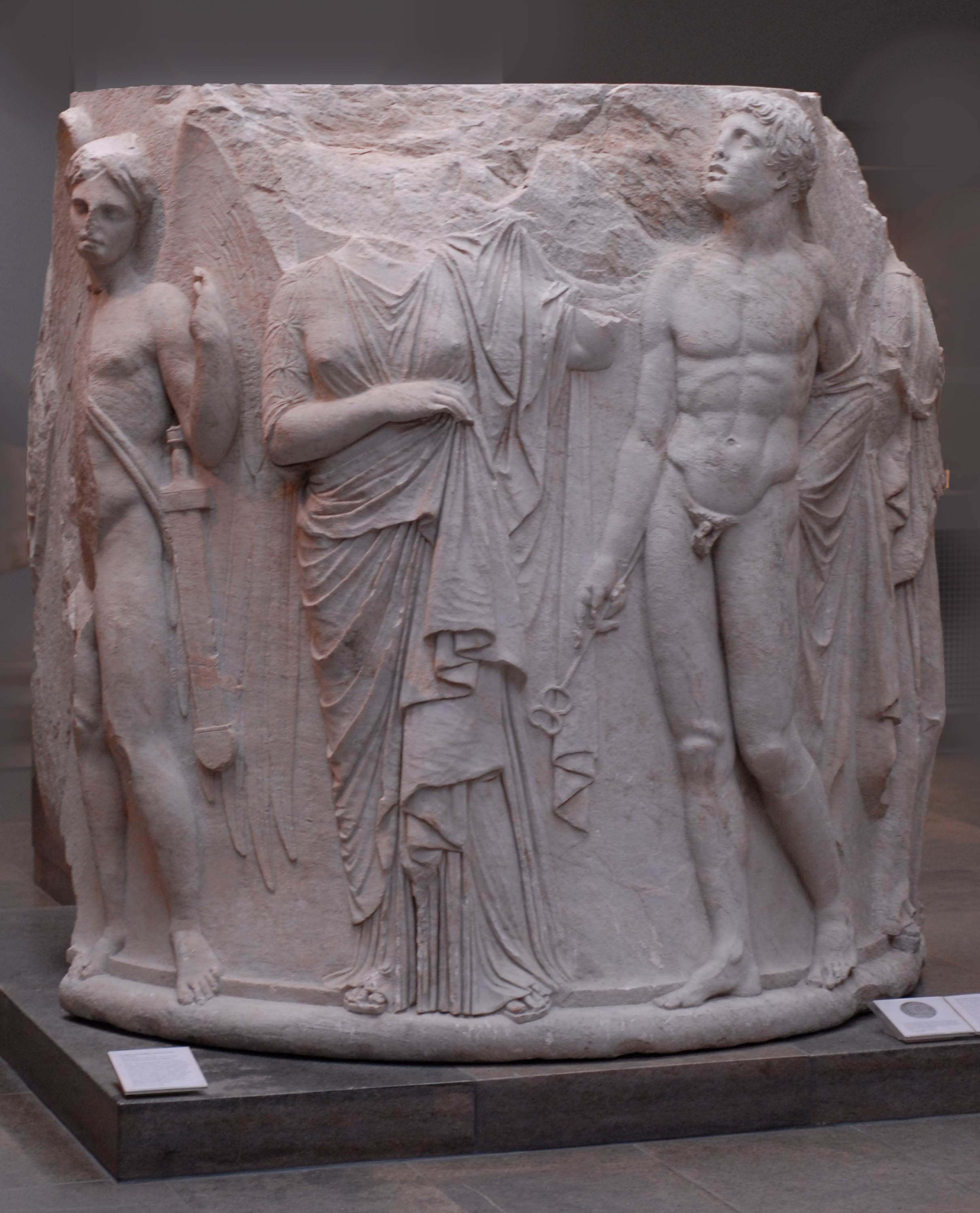
Relief on a column drum from the Temple of Artemis at Ephesus possibly depicting Thanatos, Alcestis and Hermes, exhibited at the British Museum.

The categorization of Alcestis has been a subject of debate among literary critics. It employs both tragic and comic elements, and (when first performed) occupied a slot that was generally reserved for satyr plays. Conacher explores how Euripides expanded the myth of Admetus and Alcestis, and added elements of comedy and folk tales. Beye also discusses legendary and fairy tale aspects of the play.

Alcestis is also a popular text for women's studies. Critics have indicated that the play's central focus is Admetus rather than Alcestis. Segal, for example, has written of the play's patriarchal aspects. The nature of sacrifice, especially in ancient times, has been variously analysed by Rabinowitz, Vellacott, and Burnett, who explain that ancient Greek morality differed considerably from that of the present day. Modern interpretations of the play have been extremely varied, so much so that critics (such as Michelini and Gounaridou) have noted their failure to agree on much of anything. Gounaridou argues that Euripides meant for the play to be understood in many different ways. The psychologies and motivations of Admetus and Alcestis are especially disputed, with the question of Admetus's selfishness strongly contested.

== Adaptations ==
There are at least seven operas based on the play, six of them named Alceste: the 1674 opera by Jean-Baptiste Lully, a 1750 opera by George Frideric Handel, a 1767 opera by Christoph Willibald Gluck - famous for being published with his proposals for revising operatic composition, a 1773 opera by Anton Schweitzer, and a 1768 opera by Pietro Alessandro Guglielmi.

Rutland Boughton's 1922 opera Alkestis is based on the Gilbert Murray translation. It was performed at Covent Garden by the British National Opera Company and was broadcast by the nascent British Broadcasting Company, both in 1924.

The American theatre director Robert Wilson staged a production of the play in 1986 at the American Repertory Theater in Cambridge, Massachusetts and in 1987 at the Staatstheater in Stuttgart. The production supplemented Euripides' play with material drawn from a range of sources, united by their exploration of the themes of death and rebirth. It began with Heiner Müller's Explosion of a Memory (Description of a Picture) (1985) as a prologue; the piece is a dream narrative partly composed using automatic writing. Müller described it as a description of "a landscape beyond death" that is "an overpainting of Euripides' Alcestis which quotes the Noh play Kumasaka, the Eleventh Canto of the Odyssey, and Hitchcock's The Birds." The production also utilised a Japanese kyogen play whose themes parodied those of Alcestis, laser projections, a musical score by Laurie Anderson, and sound sculptures by composer Robert Rutman.

T. S. Eliot's play The Cocktail Party is a modern adaption of Alcestis; it was premiered at the Edinburgh Festival on 22 August 1949, directed by E. Martin Browne.

== Translations ==
- Rev. Robert Potter, 1781 – prose: full text
- Edward Philip Coleridge, 1891 – prose: (full text at Wikisource)
- Arthur S. Way, 1894 – verse: (full text at Wikisource)
- Gilbert Murray, 1915 – verse: (full text at Wikisource)
- Richard Aldington, 1930 – prose and verse: full text
- Augustus T. Murray, 1931 – prose
- Moses Hadas and John McLean, 1936 – prose
- Dudley Fitts and Robert Fitzgerald, 1936 - verse
- Richmond Lattimore, 1955 – verse
- Philip Vellacott, 1974 – prose and verse
- William Arrowsmith, 1974 – verse
- David Kovacs, 1994 – prose: full text
- Paul Roche, 1998; from a Signet edition of ten plays by Euripides
- Ted Hughes, 1999 – verse
- Anne Carson, 2006 – prose and verse
- Diane Arnson Svarlien, 2007 – verse
- George Theodoridis, 2008 – prose, full text
- Rachel Kitzinger, 2016 – verse
- Brian Vinero, 2019 – verse

== Sources ==
- Banham, Martin, ed. 1998. The Cambridge Guide to Theatre. Cambridge: Cambridge University Press. ISBN 0-521-43437-8.
- Brockett, Oscar G. and Franklin J. Hildy. 2003. History of the Theatre. Ninth edition, International edition. Boston: Allyn and Bacon. ISBN 0-205-41050-2.
- Fitts, Dudley, ed. 1960a. Four Greek Plays. New York: Harcourt, Brace & World. ISBN 0-15-602795-X.
- ---. 1960b. Introduction. In Fitts (1960a, 143–145).
- Fitts, Dudley, and Robert Fitzgerald. 1960. The Alcestis of Euripides. By Euripides. In Fitts (1960a, 149-199).
- L. P. E. Parker, 2007 Euripides Alcestis with Introduction and Commentary. Oxford (Oxford University Press). ISBN 0199254672
- Weber, Carl, ed. & trans. 1989. Explosion of a Memory: Writings by Heiner Müller. By Heiner Müller. New York: Performing Arts Journal Publications. ISBN 1-55554-041-4.
