= Greek chorus =

Group of performers who comment on a drama

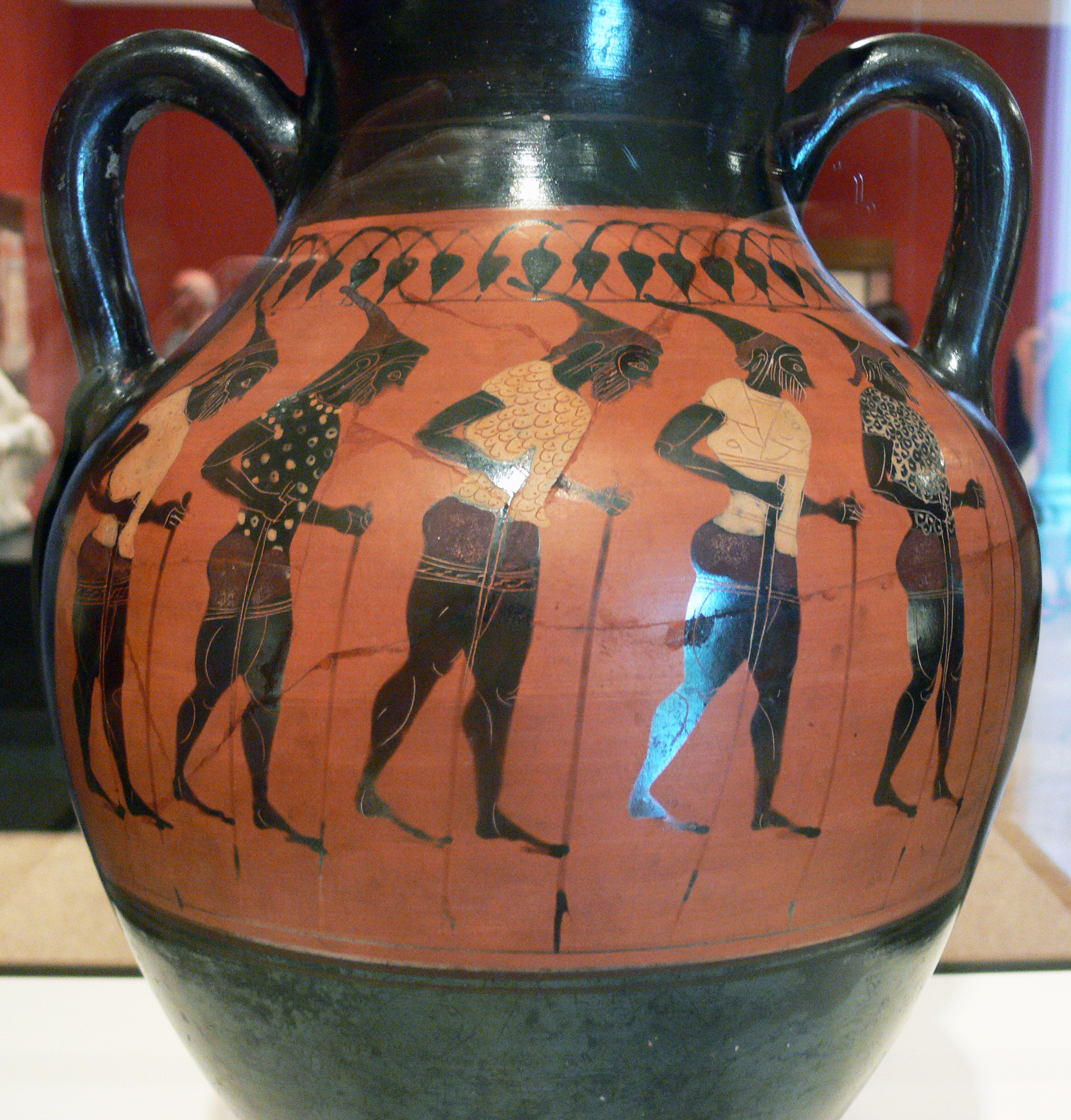
Getty Villa – Storage Jar with a chorus of Stilt walkers – inv. VEX.2010.3.65

A Greek chorus (Ancient Greek: χορός, romanized: chorós) in the context of ancient Greek tragedy, comedy, and satyr plays, is a homogeneous group of performers who comment with a collective voice on the action of the scene in which they appear, or provide necessary insight into action which has taken place offstage. Historically, the chorus consisted of between 12 and 50 players, who variously danced, sang or spoke their lines in unison, and sometimes wore masks. The players used masks to change their emotions while they were performing.

== History ==
A common theory for the origin of the Greek chorus stems from the ancient Greek poet Arion's invention of the tragedy, the stationary chorus, and satyrs' verses. In Aristotle's Poetics, he writes that "[Tragedy] came into being from an improvisatory origin (that is, both tragedy and comedy: the former from the leaders of dithyramb, the other from the leaders of the phallic songs which remain even now a custom in many cities), it was gradually enhanced as poets developed the potential they saw in it."

The role of the chorus fluctuated. For example, Aeschylus foregrounded the dialogue by increasing the number of actors and reducing the role of the chorus in his works. They also played a role in the Athenian polis, with members of a chorus forming life-long bonds as they performed this civic duty.

It is thought that choruses had their start in Dionysian dithyrambs, hymns and dances in honor Dionysus, and then other characters began to be incorporated. Satyr-plays were then added to the beginning of performances to make certain that Dionysus continued to be honored.

The Greek playwrights of the 5th century paid homage to the chorus' musical and choreographic origins. They did so by incorporating dance and sung odes into their work. For example, Aeschylus and Euripides either composed accompaniments to their own tragedies or had accompaniments commissioned, and Sophocles accompanied at least one of his plays on the cithara, an ancient lyre-like instrument.

German poet and philosopher Friedrich Schiller also tried to use the chorus in his tragedy The Bride of Messina. After it was performed in March 1803 at Weimar, the performance was celebrated by students but denounced by critics. They specifically critiqued his use of the chorus. German poet Schiller Carlyle said that "the chorus retarded the plot, dissipating and diffusing the sympathies."

In 1910, Sir William Ridgeway published The Origin of Tragedy, in which he argued that as Greek tragedy originated from the dithyramb, the tragic genre itself stemmed from Dionysian traditions.

== Dramatic function ==
All of the extant plays of the ancient Greek theatre include a chorus that offered a variety of background and summary information to help the audience follow the performance. They commented on themes, and, as August Wilhelm Schlegel proposed in the early 19th century to subsequent controversy, demonstrated how the audience might react to the drama. According to Schlegel, the Chorus is "the ideal spectator", and conveys to the actual spectator "a lyrical and musical expression of his own emotions, and elevates him to the region of contemplation".

In the Greek tragedy, the chorus makes their first entrance in the parodos, or the song performed by the chorus upon their entrance into the performance. Throughout the tragedy, episodes, where characters and chorus converse, and stasima, where the chorus performs a stasimon (choral ode), at the end of each episode to summarize and contextualize events, are interspersed. In the exodus, or the play's final scene, the chorus performs a song imparting some message or moral before exiting. Paul Woodruff argues that the chorus most often expresses grief simultaneously with the main characters, calling them "grief-leaders".

Some historians argue that the chorus was itself considered to be an actor. Scholar Albert Weiner considers that it is better when a chorus is "integrated into the fabric of the play" and more resembles a unified character. Since Euripides' choruses seem less unified, Sophocles' choruses more often received praise, and Euripides' choruses criticized for having little to do with the plot. Aristotle stated in his Poetics:

The chorus too must be regarded as one of the actors. It must be part of the whole and share in the action, not as in Euripides but as in Sophocles.

The chorus represents, on stage, the general population of the particular story, in sharp contrast with many of the themes of the ancient Greek plays which tended to be about individual heroes, gods, and goddesses. They were often the same gender as the main character. In Aeschylus' Agamemnon, the chorus comprises the elderly men of Argos, whereas in Euripides' The Bacchae, they are a group of eastern bacchantes, and in Sophocles' Electra, the chorus represents the women of Argos. In Aeschylus' The Eumenides, however, the chorus takes the part of a host of avenging Furies.

In some cases, the Greek chorus was used as an intermediary between their represented population and the audience, particularly in terms of moral evaluation. In Seneca's Thyestes, the chorus details the offstage events of the play in gruesome detail, specifically creating visceral descriptions of the murders of Thyestes' sons, evoking disgust on behalf of the immoral behavior of Atreus.

In the same play, the chorus is thought to have agency in communicating the themes of the play, making imagistic references to hunger by way of communicating themes of desire, which in Thyestes manifests by way of literal hunger and consumption, but also in the pursuit of revenge. Despite serving as clarifying voices, the greek chorus is not always omniscient; the knowledge they lack sometimes speak to a distance in status between the chorus and a protagonist by way of emphasizing the position of the latter. The chorus thus comes not only to represent the hierarchical positioning of the general Greek society at the time, but their text provides insight into political thoughts and ideals. In reference to Atreus, the text spoken by the chorus oscillates between positive, negative, and neutral connotations; they critique the monarchy, but prescribe necessary points of indifference to the king at hand. Their text can thus be mined into in order to gain insight into the political and societal situations of the time, with particular obedience to the position of the general member of society.

In the surviving tragedies, the choruses represent:

Aeschylus:

- Agamemnon – Elders of Argos
- The Eumenides – Furies
- The Libation Bearers – Enslaved Women
- The Persians – Elders of Susa
- Prometheus Bound – Oceanids
- Seven Against Thebes – Theban Women
- The Suppliants – The Danaïdes

Sophocles:

- Ajax – Sailors from Salamis
- Antigone – Elders of Thebes
- Electra – Mycenaean Women
- Oedipus at Colonus – Elders of Colonus
- Oedipus Rex – Elders of Thebae
- Philoctetes – Sailors of Neoptolemus
- Women of Trachis – Trachinian Women

Euripides:

- Alcestis – Elders of Pherae
- Andromache – Phthian Women
- The Bacchae – Lydian Maenads
- Children of Heracles – Elders of Athens
- Electra – Argive Women
- Hecuba – Enslaved Trojan Women
- Helen – Enslaved Greek Women in Egypt
- Heracles – Elders of Thebes
- Hippolytus – Troezenian Women, Attendants to Hippolytus
- Ion – Women in the Service of Creusa
- Iphigenia in Aulis – Chalcidian Women
- Iphigenia in Tauris – Enslaved Greek Women in Taurica
- Medea – Corinthian Women
- Orestes – Argive Women
- The Phoenician Women – Phoenician Women
- Rhesus – Trojan Sentinels
- The Suppliants – Mothers and Sons of the Fallen Thebans
- The Trojan Women – Trojan Noble Women

== Choral structure and size ==
No record beyond the words of the script has survived to describe what an ancient Greek audience might have seen and heard during a performance of a choral ode, but a study of those words, including etymology and other even more decisive evidence, makes it possible to derive a general idea that a performance of choral ode was a mix of lyric poetry, dancing and singing joined together with drama. According to scholar H. D. F. Kitto: "The Greek verb choreuo, 'I am a member of the chorus', has the sense 'I am dancing'. The word ode means not something recited or declaimed, but 'a song'". The large section of the stage where the chorus danced and sang is the 'orchestra' which is translated to mean a 'dancing floor'.

The lines of choral odes provide evidence that they were sung. Normal syllabic structure has long sounds that are twice the length of short sounds. However, some lyrics in Greek odes have long syllables that are equal to 3, 4 and 5 shorter syllables. Spoken words cannot do that, suggesting that this was a danced and sung rhythm.

The chorus consisted of fifty members at the start of the 5th century B.C. It was likely Aeschylus who lowered the number to twelve, and Sophocles who raised it to fifteen. The size stayed at fifteen to the end of the 5th century B.C. Fifteen members were used by Euripides and Sophocles in tragedies. There were twenty-four members in comedies.

In terms of gender, starting from the 8th century BC, there are depictions of female ensembles or female members performing alongside men in mixed choruses. However, these examples disappear by the 5th century. There is not a lot of evidence in Greek literature for female choruses. Much of it is indirect reference, which scholars have then parsed for clues.

For example, Euripides' character Electra complains about her inability to perform in a chorus and festivals. In other examples, poets and playwrights use the term choros to refer to female group performances. Although this usage existed, it was not common. Plato referred to women dancing Corybantic dances with choral language, but contextual evidence indicates to scholars Budelmann and Power that he does not regard it on the same level as traditional Greek choruses. Additionally, both Sophocles and Pausanias refer to the Thyiades as a choros.

Budelmann and Power agree with the mainstream conclusion that female choruses were a minor part of Greek choral culture, but posit that these ensembles did exist outside of the civic performances dominated by traditional Greek choruses. They were not allowed to perform at major events like the City Dionysia, where female characters were instead portrayed by male ensemble members. Instead, they performed at polis festivals, private performances, female-only festivals, and outside urban areas.

Female choreia at private performances included the dekatê and weddings. The dekatê, an event on the tenth day after birth at which the baby is given a name, were generally small-scale events attended by close friends and family. Greek weddings during the time period featured dancing and singing by both genders, together and separately, but were very different from formal choral performances.

Female choreia also existed outside of Athens, but performances were segregated by gender. Plutarch and Aristophanes' Lysistrata both refer to women dancing at Kolias in the Classical period, in honour of Demeter and Aphrodite, respectively.

== Stage management ==
The chorus performed using several techniques, including singing, dancing, narrating, and acting. There is evidence that there were strong rhythmic components to their speaking.

They often communicated in song form, but sometimes spoke their lines in unison. The chorus had to work in unison to help explain the play as there were only one to three actors on stage who were already playing several parts each. As the Greek theatres were so large, the chorus' actions had to be exaggerated and their voices clear so that everyone could see and hear them. To do this, they used techniques such as synchronization, echo, ripple, physical theatre and the use of masks to aid them. A Greek chorus was often led by a coryphaeus. They also served as the ancient equivalent for a curtain, as their parodos (entering procession) signified the beginnings of a play and their exodos (exit procession) served as the curtains closing.

The layout of ancient Greek theatres had an orchestra component, quite literally "dancing space", which were generally flat. There, the chorus would perform and interact with the actors. Originally, these spaces were simply dirt, but transitioned to paved ground in the Classical period, sometimes with marble. These orchestra areas sometimes also featured a thymele, or altar.

== Decline in antiquity ==
Before the introduction of multiple, interacting actors by Aeschylus, the Greek chorus was the main performer in relation to a solitary actor. The importance of the chorus declined after the 5th century BCE, when the chorus began to be separated from the dramatic action. Later dramatists depended on the chorus less than their predecessors. As dialogue and characterization became more important, the chorus made less of an appearance. However, historian Alan Hughes argues that there was no such thing as decline, but rather the slow dissolution of one form into another:

At their best, they may have become performance art, blending music, lyrics, and dance, performed by polished choreutai and accompanied by distinguished musicians. That is neither improvement nor decline: it is simply change.

== Modern choruses ==
Musical theatre and grand opera sometimes incorporate a singing chorus that serves a similar purpose as the Greek chorus, as noted in Six Plays by Rodgers and Hammerstein: "The singing chorus is used frequently to interpret the mental and emotional reactions of the principal characters, after the manner of a Greek chorus." The idea of the greek chorus as a tactic in musical theatre is significant in winner of the 2020 Pulitzer Prize for Drama, A Strange Loop, in which six "Thoughts" follow around the protagonist, Usher, and represent his "perceptions of reality".

During the Italian Renaissance, there was a renewed interest in the theatre of ancient Greece. The Florentine Camerata crafted the first operas out of the intermezzi that acted as comic or musical relief during the dramas of the time. Historian H. C. Montgomery argues that these were based entirely on the Greek chorus.

Richard Wagner discussed Greek drama and the Greek chorus extensively in his writings, including "Art and Revolution". His longest work, Der Ring des Nibelungen (The Ring of the Nibelung), is based in the style of Oresteia with parallels in rhythm and overall structure (both have three parts, though The Ring of the Nibelung begins with Das Rheingold as a prologue to the other three parts). Montgomery also argues that Wagner's use of the orchestra is similar to the Greek chorus as both generally conclude the drama of the plot, "bridg[ing] the space from the dramatic action back to every-day life."

The musical Little Shop of Horrors features a modern version of a Greek chorus in the form of characters Crystal, Ronette, and Chiffon, whose songs provide narration to the play.

A Greek chorus is also used in the Woody Allen film Mighty Aphrodite, in which the chorus gives advice to the neurotic main character.

== See also ==
- Chorus of the elderly in classical Greek drama
