= Pheres (son of Cretheus) =

Son of Cretheus in Greek mythology

In Greek mythology, Pheres (Ancient Greek: Φέρης, romanized: Phéres or Phérēs, lit. 'bringer', 'bearer' or 'carrier') is the son of Cretheus and Tyro, and the brother of Aeson and Amythaon. In the Bibliotheca of Apollodorus, he is said to be the founder of Pherae in Thessaly.

In the Fabulae, he is said to be the father of Admetus by Periclymene. In addition to Admetus, Apollodorus calls Lycurgus, Idomene, and Periopis children of Pheres.

== Family ==
According to the Bibliotheca, a 2nd-century AD work by the Greek mythographer Apollodurs, Pheres is the son of Cretheus, the founder of Iolcus, and his wife Tyro. He is given two brothers, Aeson and Amythaon. The same genealogy is given by the 1st-century BC historian Diodorus Siculus in his Bibliotheca historica.

In the Fabulae, attributed to Gaius Julius Hyginus, Pheres marries Periclymene, a daughter of Minyas, by whom he becomes the father of Admetus. In addition to Admetus, Apollodorus includes Lycurgus as a son of Pheres, and mentions Eidomene, who becomes the wife of Amythaon, and Periopis, as his daughters. Hyginus also mentions Antigona, the mother of Asterius, as the daughter of a figure named Pheres. Of them, Admetus was the husband of the famous Alcestis, who died in his stead and was rescued by Heracles, while Pheres, despite his old age, would not do the same for his son.

== Mythology ==
In Aeschylus' Eumenides Pheres is mentioned by the Chorus of Erinyes of Clytemnestra. The Erinyes were the avengers for the mother-blood Orestes spilled by ordering of Apollo. The Chorus leader argues with Apollo over the just sentence Athena and her panel of judges are about to speak.

Chorus Leader:	You honor bloody crimes that aren't your business. Your oracles will never now be pure.
Apollo:	So Zeus made a mistake when Ixion, the first to kill, appealed to him for help?
Chorus Leader:	You said it, I didn't. But if I don't get justice, I will come back to crush this land forever.
Apollo:	How so? You have no honor among the gods, young or old. I will win this case.
Chorus Leader:	You did the same thing too, in Pheres' house: you persuaded the Fates to let men hide from death.
Apollo:	Is it unjust to treat someone so kindly, someone so pious, in his time of need?'

According to Apollodorus, Pheres was the founder of the city of Pherae in Thessaly.
