= Periclymene =

In Greek mythology, Periclymene or Periklymene (Ancient Greek: Περικλύμενη, lit. 'famous', 'renowned' or 'much-talked-of') may refer to two distinct characters:

- Periclymene, a Minyan princess as the daughter of King Minyas of Orchomenus and Euryanassa. She became the mother of Admetus, Lycurgus, Eidomene (wife of Amythaon), Periopis (mother of Patroclus) and Antigona (mother of Asterius), by King Pheres of Pherae. Periclymene or Clymene was also said to have Iphiclus, Alcimede and possibly Clymenus by Phylacus of Phylace. Other sources would identify Iphiclus as her son by Cephalus, son of Deion and brother of Phylacus.
- Periclymene, one of the maenads named in a vase painting.
