= Eriboea (mythology) =

Greek myth set index

In Greek mythology, Eriboea (Ancient Greek: Ἐρίβοια, lit. 'rich in cattle' or 'worth many oxen'), also Eeriboea (Ἠερίβοια), were the name of the following figures:

- Eriboea, second wife of Aloeus and daughter of Eurymachus, son of Hermes.
- Eriboea, wife of King Admetus of Pherae. She was commonly called Alcestis.
- Eriboea, alternate name for Periboea, wife of Telamon and mother of Ajax the Great.
- Eriboea, one of the Amazons. She was killed by the hero Heracles.
- Eriboea, one of the sacrificial victims of the Minotaur according to the inscription on a vase.
