= Macaria (daughter of Heracles) =

Daughter of Heracles

In Greek mythology, Macaria (Ancient Greek: Μακαρία, romanized: Makaría, lit. 'blessed one, blessedness') is a daughter of the divine hero Heracles. After his immolation, Eurystheus hunted down the descendants of the hero, eventually besieging them in Athens. Macaria offered herself as sacrifice in order to save her kin and the city.

== Etymology ==
The ancient Greek noun μακαρία translates to "happiness" or "bliss", but it can also mean "foolishness".

== Family ==
Macaria was the daughter of Heracles, the Theban divine hero, and Deianira, his third wife.

== Mythology ==
=== Euripides ===
In the play Children of Heracles by Euripides, Macaria (Note: In Euripides' play, Macaria actually goes unnamed, and is only referred to as "maiden".) flees with her siblings Alcmene and Iolaus from King Eurystheus, who is determined to kill all the children of Heracles. They find shelter in Athens, at the court of King Demophon. Eurystheus demands he hands them over, but Demophon refuses, even upon threat of war. His ultimatum refused, Eurystheus prepares to attack. An oracle foretells that the Athenians will only be victorious if a maiden of noble birth is sacrificed to the goddess Persephone, the queen of the Underworld.

Macaria approaches Iolaus, and he informs her of the oracle's orders. Hearing that, Macaria willingly volunteers to be sacrificed, reasoning that dying on the altar is more noble than living a life as a coward who doomed a city and its inhabitants. Iolaus, admiring her courage, suggests they draw lots instead, but Macaria declines and insists she is the one who should die. As Iolaus cannot force himself to do the deed, it is Demophon who leads Macaria away to be sacrificed as she says her final farewells, leaving the others to mourn her.

=== Other versions ===
In other authors, Heracles moved with his family to Trachis, ruled by the amicable king Ceyx, where they lived until his death. Eurystheus demanded their surrender, so Ceyx advised them to flee to Athens, where they were offered shelter by Theseus himself, rather than his son.

After Macaria's death, the Athenians honoured her with expensive funeral rites during her burial, for she had died to save them. A spring in Marathon was named Macaria after her.

== Culture ==
Euripides is the oldest testimony of Macaria's tale, although he might have sourced the myth from a local Athenian legend, or even Aeschylus, an earlier Athenian playwright.

The 10th-century Byzantine lexicon Suda mentions a proverbial phrase connected to Macaria, "be gone in blessedness", that is into misery and destruction, used as a euphemism (since the dead were called the 'blessed ones') for those whose courage endangered them. This ancient Greek phrase is equivalent to modern curses like "go to hell". According to Greek sophist Zenobius however it was originally said for those who sacrificed themselves with valor, like Macaria did.

== See also ==
Other sacrificial victims include:

- Alcyoneus
- Cleostratus
- Iphigenia
- Sacrificial victims of the Minotaur

== Bibliography ==
- Bell, Robert E. (1991). Women of Classical Mythology: A Biographical Dictionary. ABC-Clio. ISBN 9780874365818.
- E. L. von Leutsch; F. W. Schneidwein, eds. (1839). Corpus Paroemiographorum Graecorum. Vol. 1. Vandenhoeck et Ruprecht. p. 48.
- Euripides, Children of Heracles in Euripides, with an English translation by David Kovacs. Cambridge. Harvard University Press. Online text available at Perseus Digital Library.
- Grimal, Pierre (1987). The Dictionary of Classical Mythology. Wiley-Blackwell. ISBN 0-631-13209-0.
- Liddell, Henry George; Scott, Robert (1940). A Greek-English Lexicon, revised and augmented throughout by Sir Henry Stuart Jones with the assistance of Roderick McKenzie. Oxford: Clarendon Press. Online version at Perseus.tufts project.
- March, Jennifer R. (May 31, 2014). Dictionary of Classical Mythology. Oxbow Books. ISBN 978-1-78297-635-6.
- Pausanias, Pausanias Description of Greece with an English Translation by W.H.S. Jones, Litt.D., and H.A. Ormerod, M.A., in 4 Volumes. Cambridge, MA, Harvard University Press; London, William Heinemann Ltd. 1918. Online version at the Perseus Digital Library.
- Smith, William (1873). A Dictionary of Greek and Roman Biography and Mythology. London, UK: John Murray, printed by Spottiswoode and Co. Online version at the Perseus.tufts library.
