= Admetus of Pherae =

King of Pherae in Thessaly, in Greek mythology

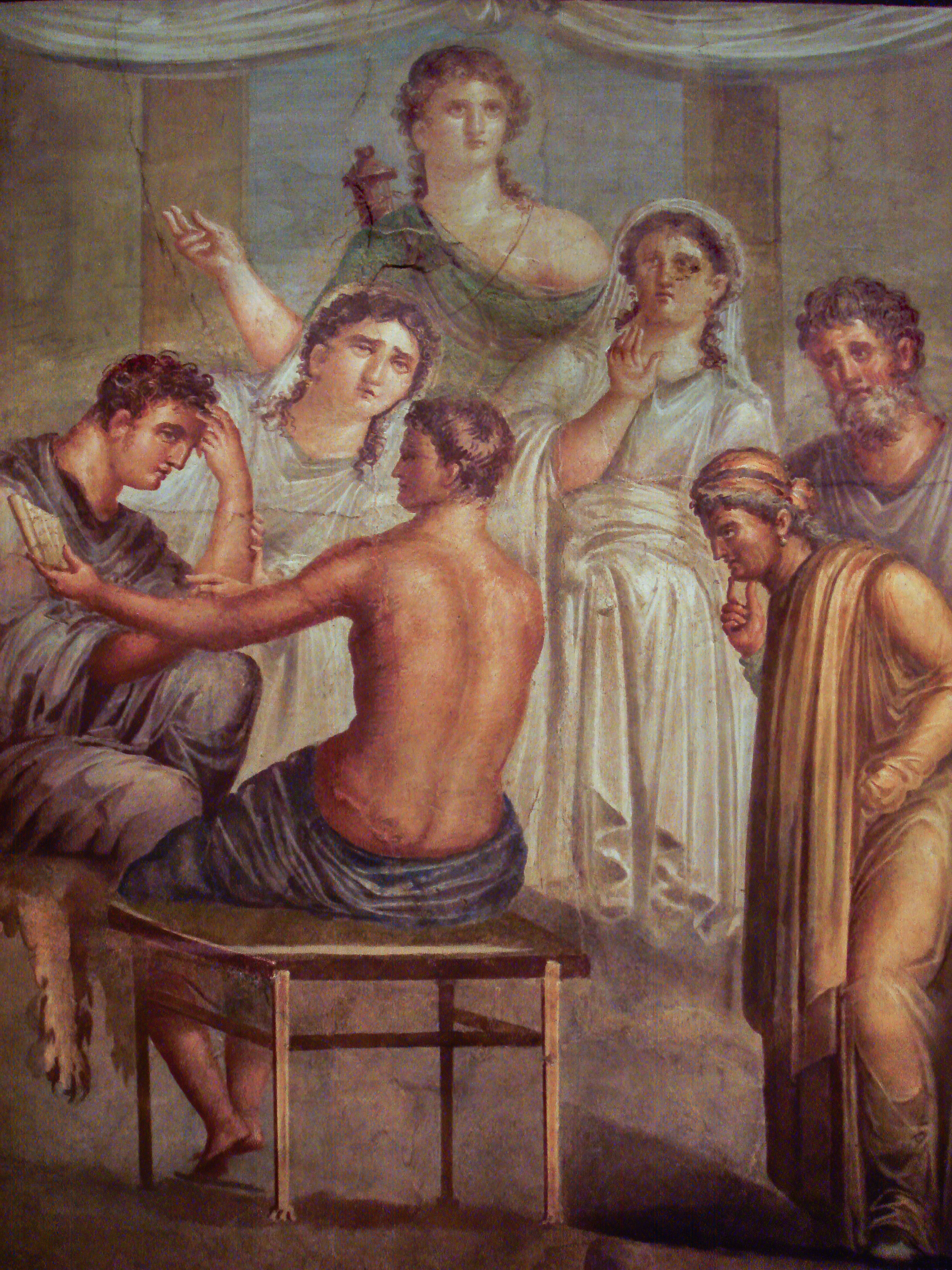
Alcestis and Admetus, ancient Roman fresco from the Augusteum in Herculaneum, Italy

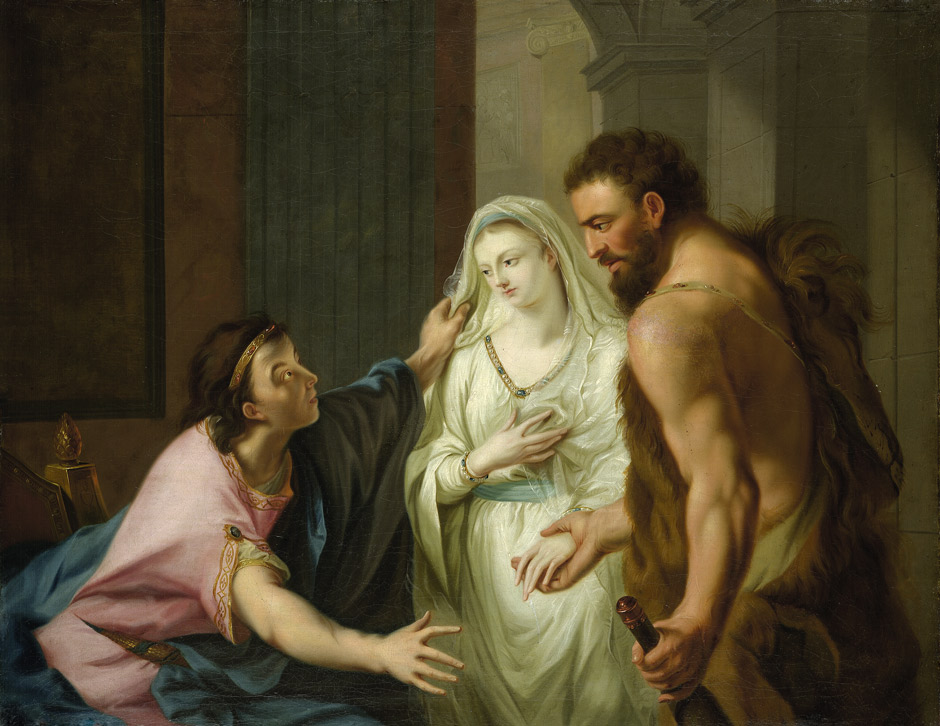
Herkules entreißt Alkestis dem Totengott Thanatos und führt sie dem Admetus zu by Johann Heinrich Tischbein (circa 1780)

In Greek mythology, Admetus (/ædˈmiːtəs/; Ancient Greek: Ἄδμητος, lit. 'the untameable') was a king of Pherae in Thessaly.

== Biography ==
Admetus succeeded his father Pheres after whom the city was named. His mother was identified as Periclymene or Clymene. He was one of the Argonauts and took part in the Calydonian Boar hunt. Admetus' wife Alcestis (also called Eriboea)offered to substitute her own death for his. The most famous of Admetus's children was Eumelus, who led a contingent from Pherae to fight in the Trojan War. He also had a daughter Perimele.

== Mythology ==
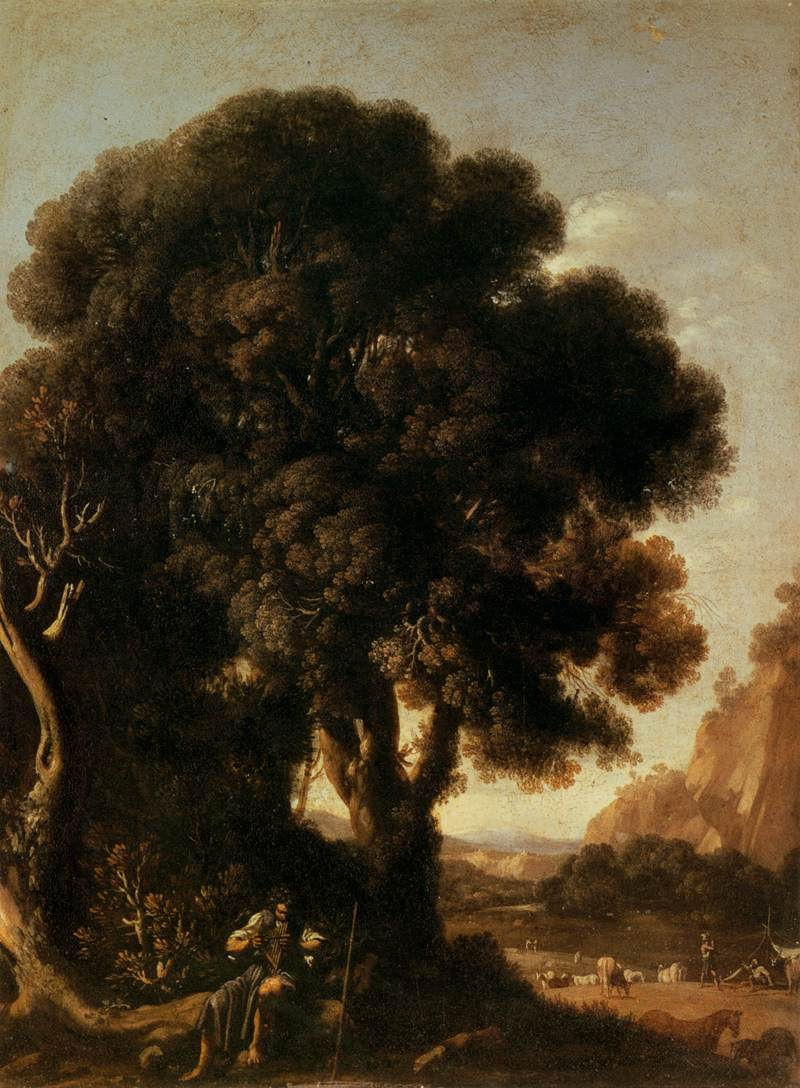
Apollo and the Cattle of Admetus by Cornelius van Poelenburgh (1620)

=== Relationship with Apollo ===
Admetus was famed for his hospitality and justice. When Apollo was sentenced to a year of servitude to a mortal as punishment for killing Delphyne, or as later tradition has it, the Cyclopes, the god was sent to Admetus' home to serve as his herdsman. Apollo in recompense for Admetus' treatment made all the cows bear twins while he served as his cowherd.

The romantic nature of their relationship was first described by Callimachus of Alexandria, who wrote that Apollo was "fired with love" for Admetus. Plutarch lists Admetus as one of Apollo's lovers and says that Apollo served Admetus because he doted upon him. Latin poet Ovid in his Ars Amatoria said that even though he was a god, Apollo forsook his pride and stayed in as a servant for the sake of Admetus. Tibullus describes Apollo's love to the king as servitium amoris (slavery of love) and asserts that Apollo became his servant not by force but by choice.

=== Marriage to Alcestis ===
Apollo later helped Admetus win the hand of Alcestis, the daughter of Pelias, king of Iolcus. Alcestis had so many suitors that Pelias set an apparently impossible task to the suitors—to win the hand of Alcestis, they must yoke a boar and a lion to a chariot. Apollo harnessed the yoke with the animals and Admetus drove the chariot to Pelias, and thus married Alcestis.

Admetus, however, neglected to sacrifice to Artemis, Apollo's sister. The offended goddess filled the bridal chamber with snakes and again, Apollo came to Admetus' aid. Apollo advised Admetus to sacrifice to Artemis, and the goddess removed the snakes.

=== Heroism of Alcestis ===
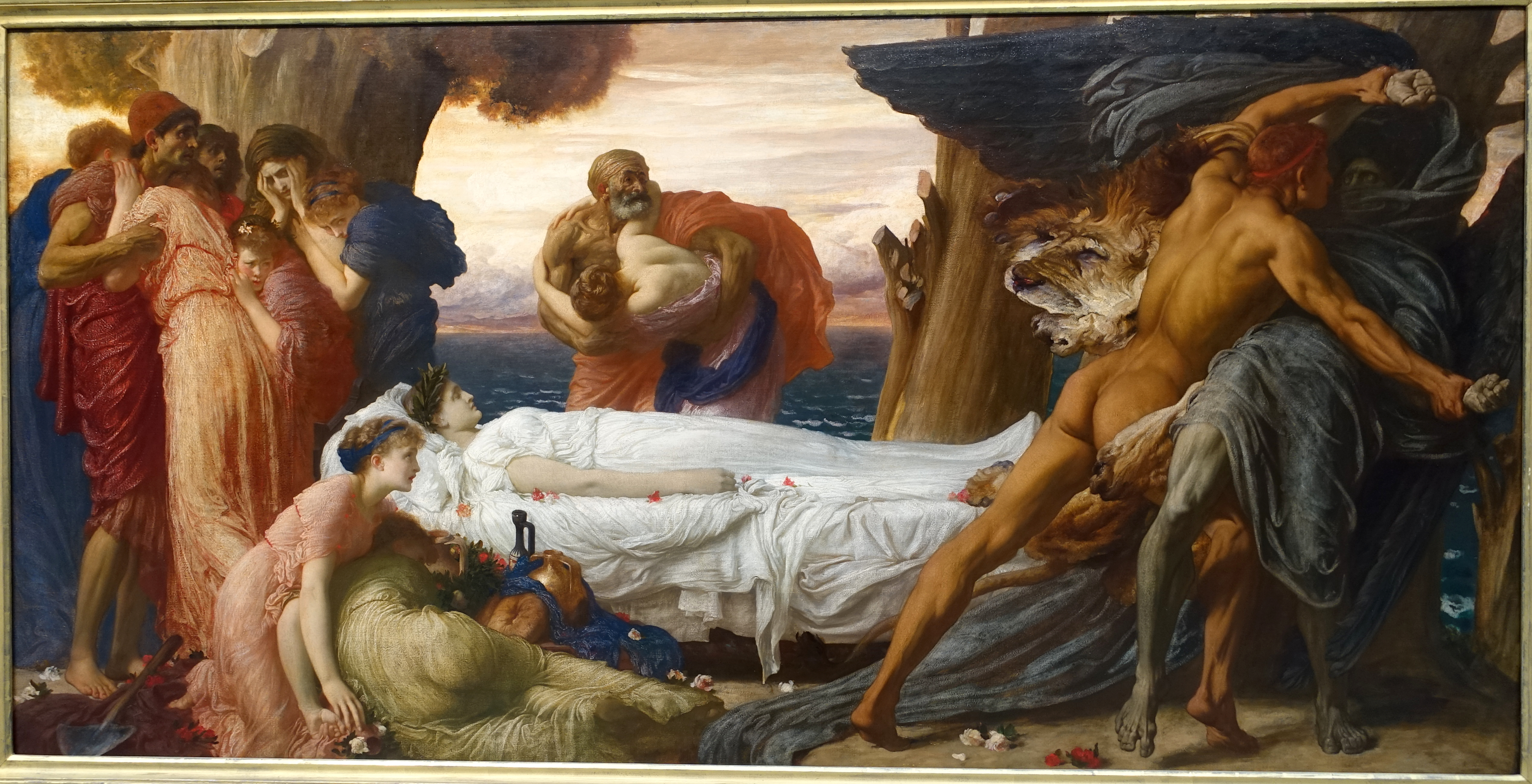
Hercules Wrestling with Death for the Body of Alcestis by Frederic Lord Leighton, England (c. 1869–1871)

The greatest aid Apollo gave to Admetus was persuading the Fates to reprieve Admetus of his fated day of death. According to Aeschylus, Apollo made the Fates drunk, and the Fates agreed to reprieve Admetus if he could find someone to die in his place. Admetus initially believed that one of his aged parents such as his father Pheres would happily take their son's place of death. When they were unwilling, Alcestis instead died for Admetus.

The scene of death is described in Euripides' play Alcestis, where Thanatos, the god of death, takes Alcestis to the Underworld. As Alcestis descends, Admetus discovers that he actually does not want to live:

I think my wife's fate is happier than my own, even though it may not seem so. No pain will ever touch her now, and she has ended life's many troubles with glory. But I, who have escaped my fate and ought not to be alive, shall now live out my life in sorrow.

— Euripides, Alcestis 935ff.

=== Intervention of Heracles ===
The situation was saved by Heracles, who rested at Pherae on his way towards the man-eating Mares of Diomedes. Heracles was greatly impressed by Admetus's kind treatment of him as a guest, and when told of Admetus' situation, he entered Alcestis' tomb. He repaid the honor Admetus had done to him by wrestling with Thanatos until the god agreed to release Alcestis, then led her back into the mortal world. According to other accounts, Persephone, queen of the Underworld instead brought Alcestis back to the upper world.

Plutarch said Heracles saved Alcestis via medicine, and that Heracles saved her because he and Admetus were lovers: "as [Admetus] had a great love for his wife, so was greatly beloved by the hero." Plutarch said Heracles had too many male lovers to count, but listed Admetus and Iolaus as two of the most notable.

== Gallery ==
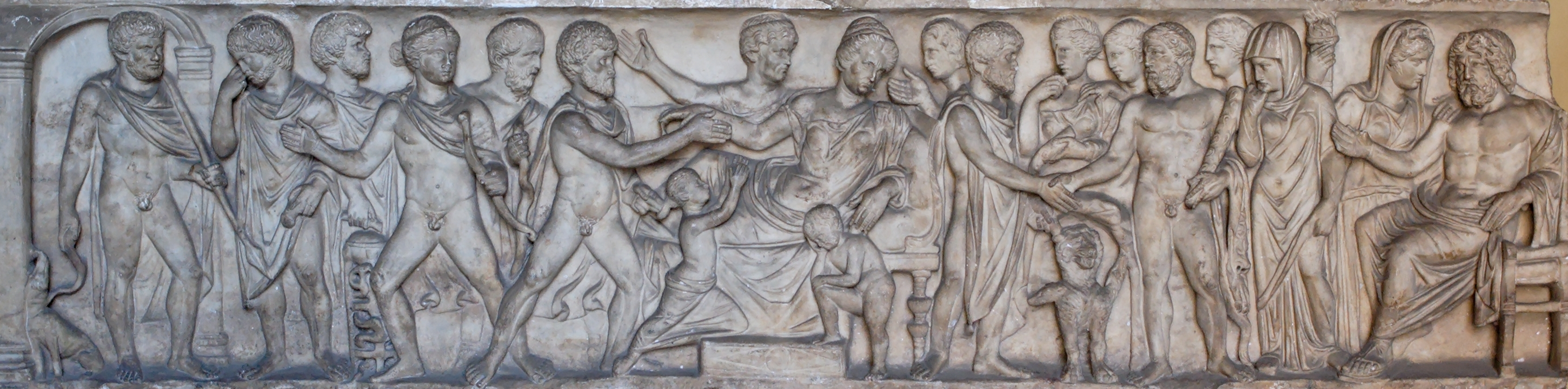
Scenes from the myth of Admetus and Alcestis. Marble, sarcophagus of C. Junius Euhodus and Metilia Acte, 161–170 CE.

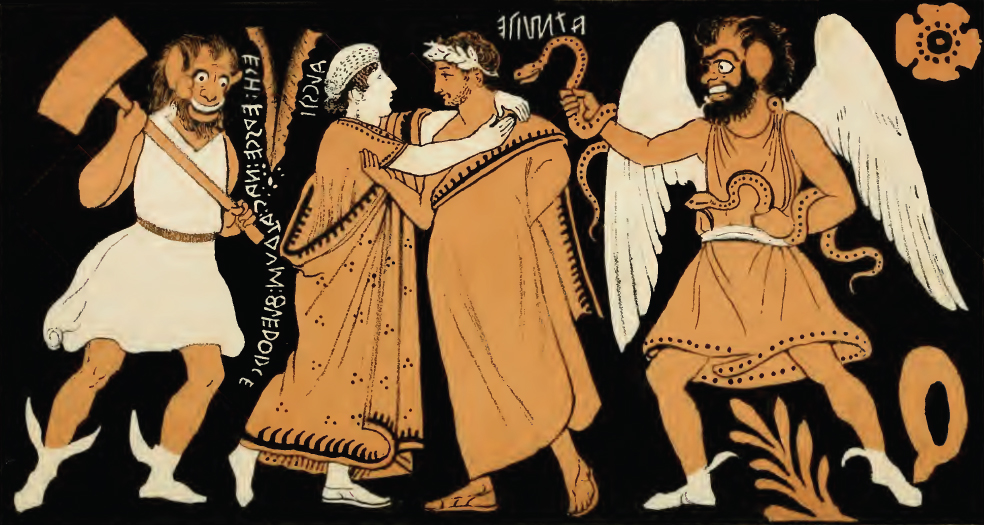
The Farewell of Admetus and Alcestis by George Dennis (1848)

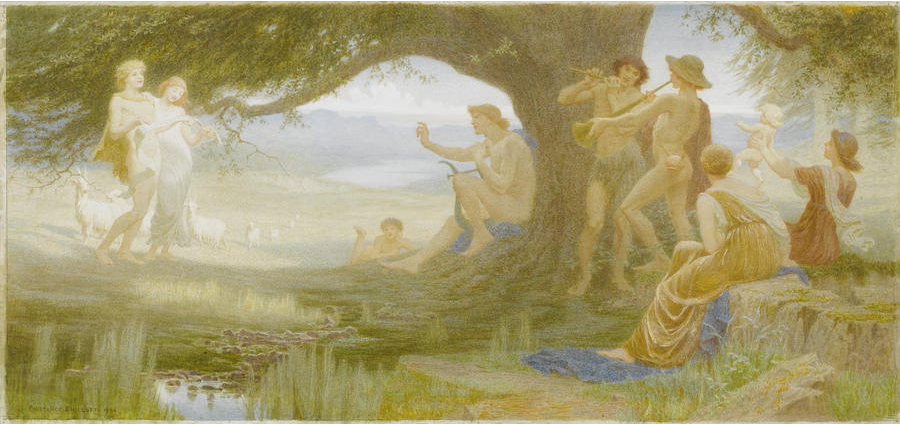
The Herdsmen of Admetus by Constance Phillott (circa 1890)

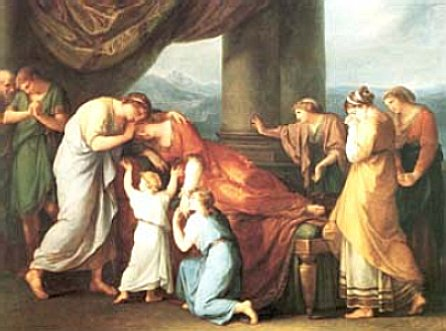
"The Death of Alcestis" by Angelica Kauffman.

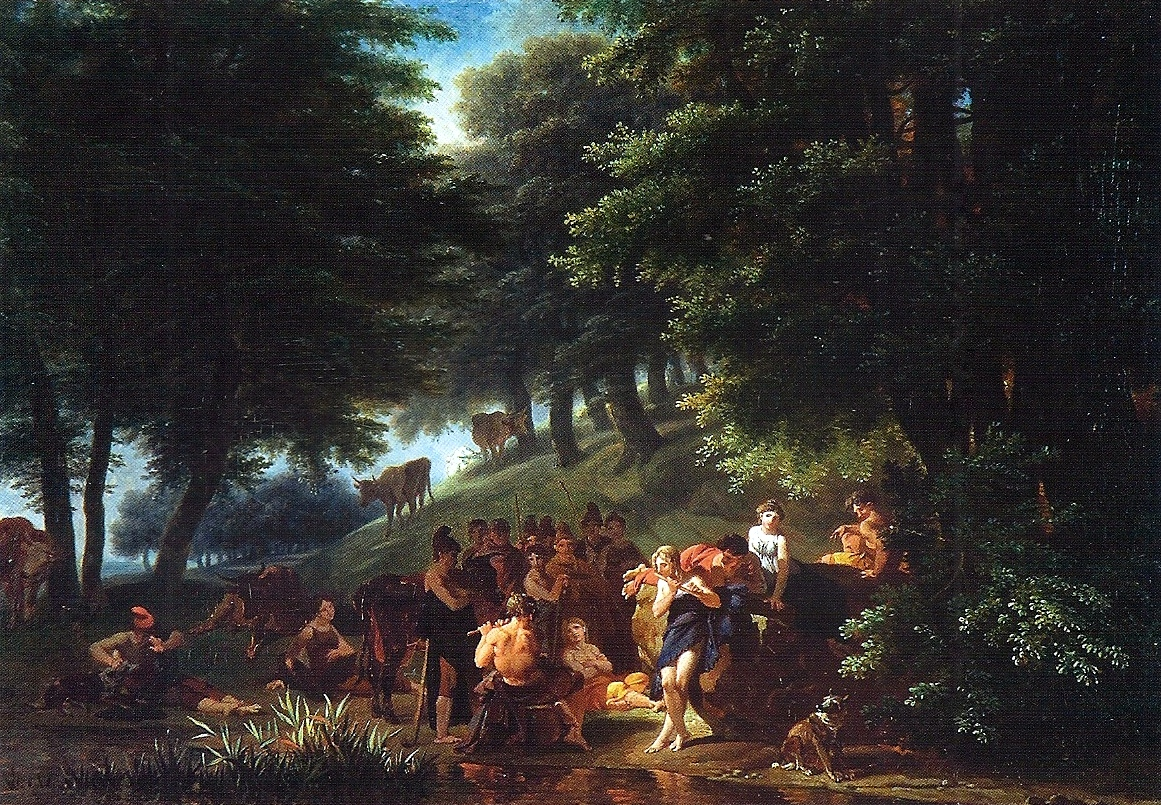
Apollo visiting Admetus by Nicolas-Antoine Taunay (19th century)

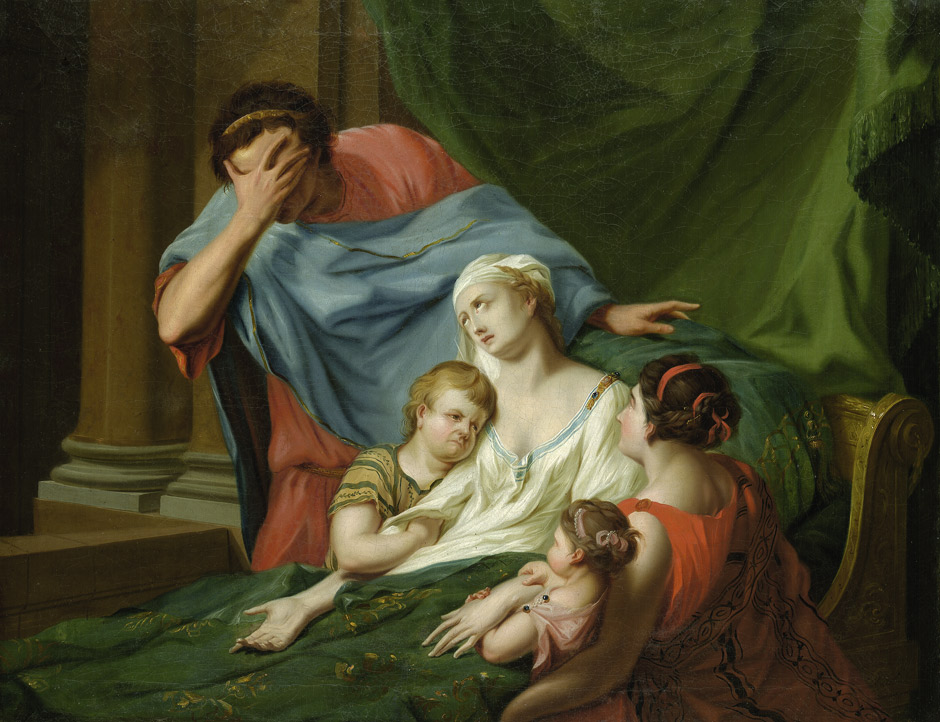
Admetus beweint Alkeste by Johann Heinrich Tischbein (circa 1780)

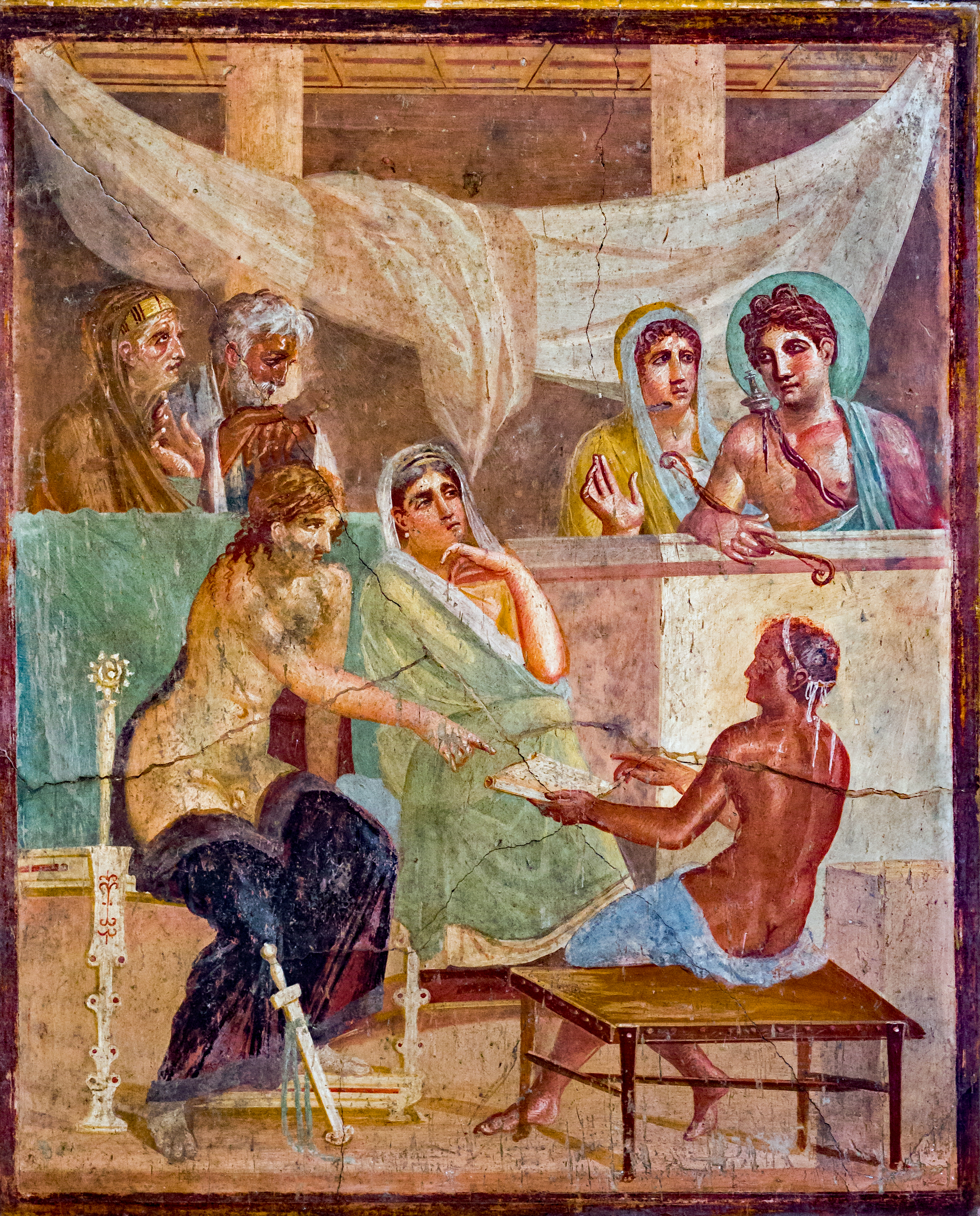
Alcestis and Admetus, ancient Roman fresco (45-79 d.C.) from the House of the Tragic Poet, Pompeii, Italy
