= Alcestis =

Princess in Greek mythology

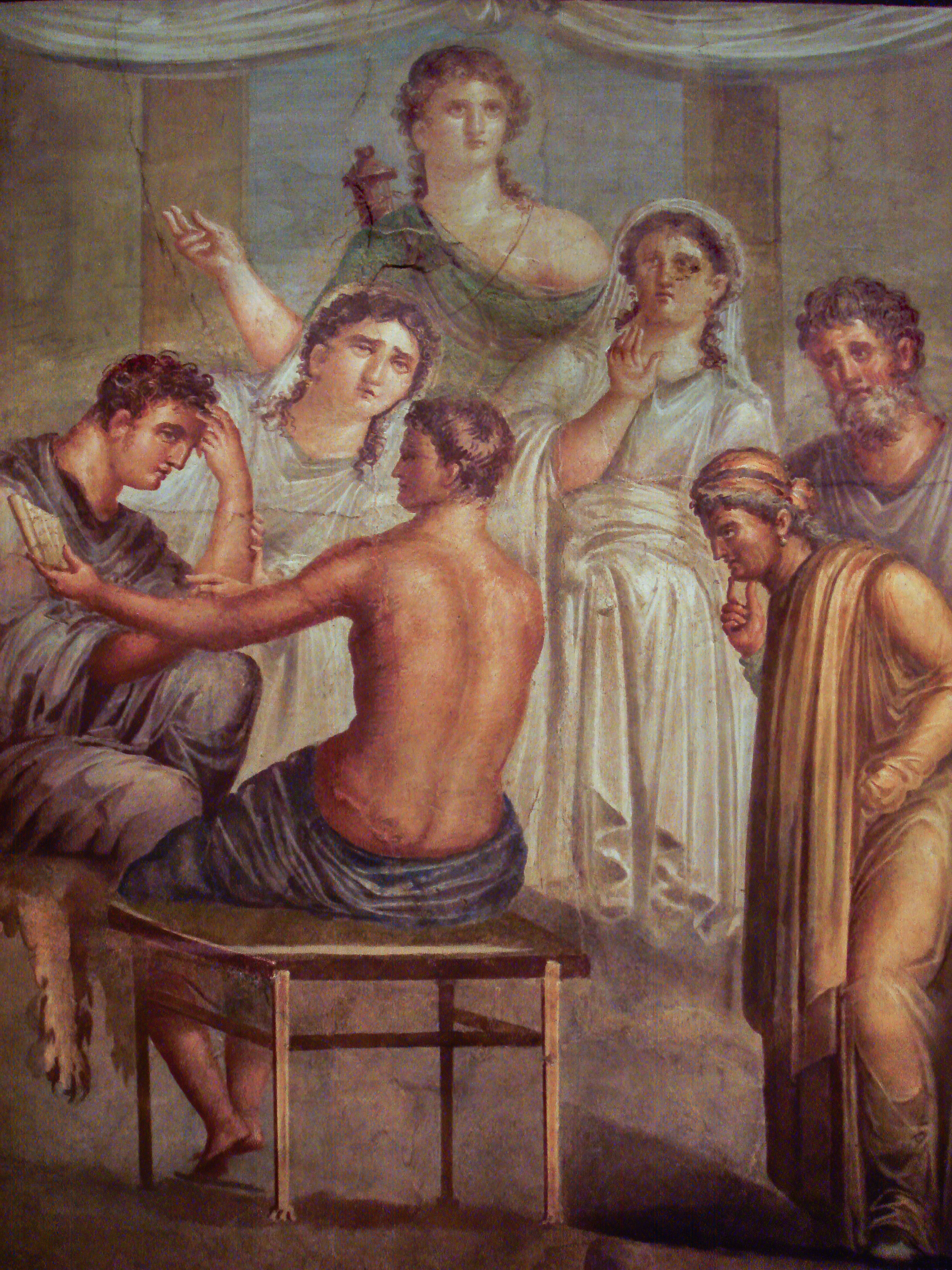
Alcestis and Admetus, ancient Roman fresco (45–79 CE) from the House of the Tragic Poet, Pompeii, Italy (photo by Stefano Bolognini).

In Greek mythology, Alcestis (/ælˈsɛstɪs/; Ancient Greek: Ἄλκηστις, Álkēstis) or Alceste, also called Eriboea, was a princess of Iolcus known for her love of her husband. Her life story was described by Pseudo-Apollodorus in his Bibliotheca, and a version of her death and return from the dead was also popularized by Euripides' tragedy Alcestis.

== Family ==
Alcestis was the fairest among the daughters of Pelias, king of Iolcus, and either Anaxibia or Phylomache. She was sister to Acastus, Pisidice, Pelopia and Hippothoe. Alcestis was the wife of Admetus by whom she bore a son, Eumelus, a participant in the siege of Troy, and a daughter, Perimele.

== Mythology ==
When Alcestis came of age to marry, many suitors presented themselves before King Pelias to compete for her hand. Pelias proposed an impossible task, and declared that she would marry the first man to yoke a lion and a boar (or a bear in some cases) to a chariot. King Admetus of Pherae, was able to complete the task with the help of Apollo, who had been banished from Olympus for one year to serve as Admetus' shepherd. Alcestis and Admetus were married, but when making sacrifices after the wedding, Admetus forgot to make the required offering to Artemis; when he opened the marriage chamber, he found his bed full of coiled snakes. Admetus interpreted the scene as a sign of his early death.

Apollo again helped the newlywed king, this time by making the Fates drunk and tricking them into promising that if anyone was willing to die in Admetus' place, they would allow it. When the day of his death came near, no one volunteered, not even his elderly parents. Alcestis alone came forward to die in place of her husband. As a token of his appreciation for Admetus' hospitality, Heracles rescued Alcestis from the underworld shortly after fighting Thanatos.

After Heracles brings Alcestis back to the mortal realm and unites her with her husband, she is unable to speak. When Admetus questions this, Heracles informs him that she will be silent for three days until she is purified of her debt to the chthonic gods.

== Gallery ==
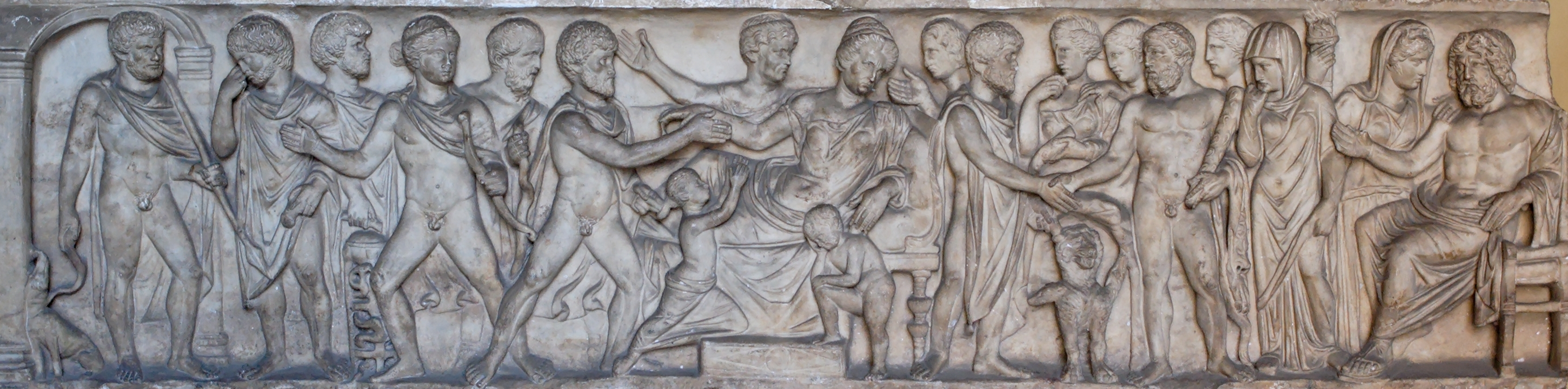
Scenes from the myth of Admetus and Alcestis. Marble, sarcophagus of C. Junius Euhodus and Metilia Acte, 161–170 CE.

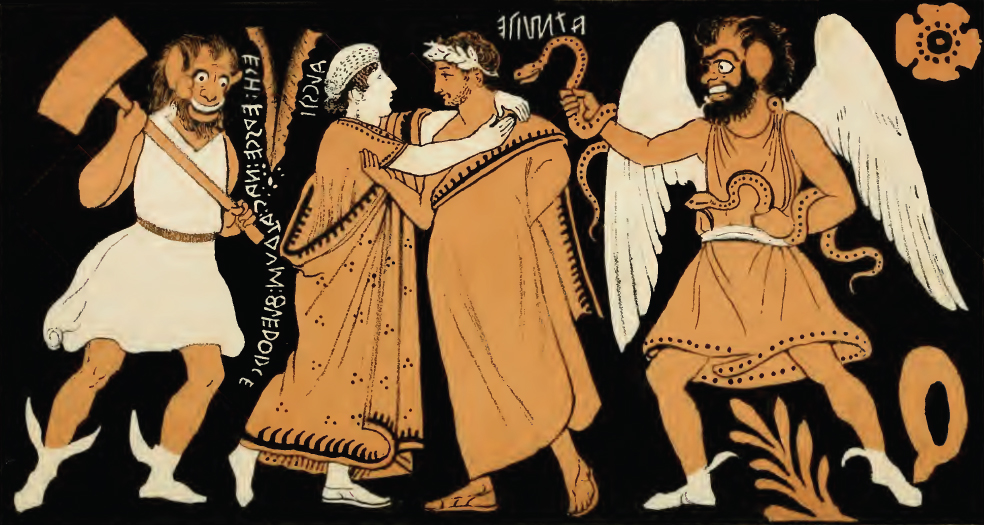
The Farewell of Admetus and Alcestis by George Dennis (1848)

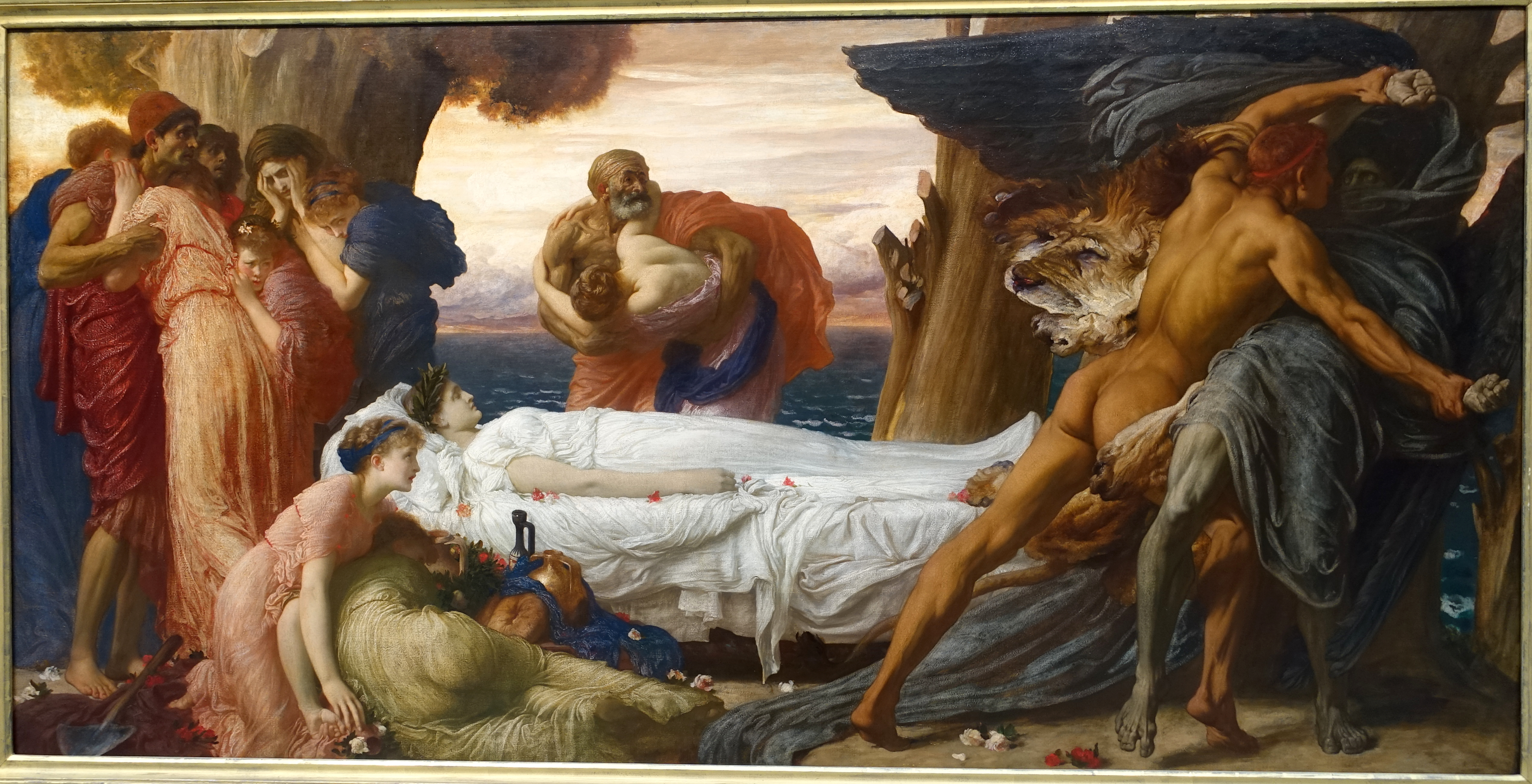
Hercules Wrestling with Death for the Body of Alcestis by Frederic Lord Leighton, England (c. 1869–1871)

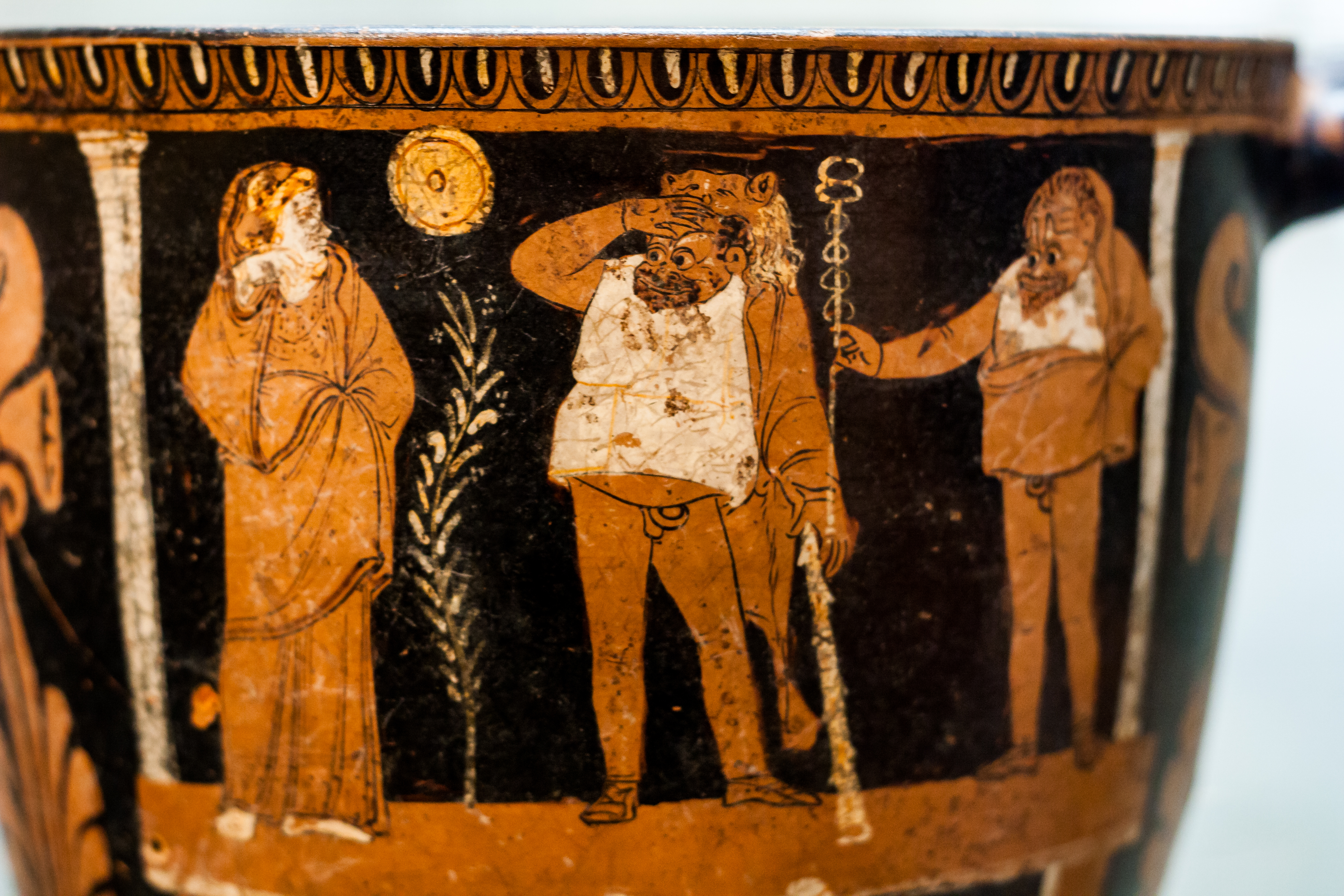
Alcestis (left), Heracles (centre), and Hermes (right) on a Sicilian red-figure skyphos, dating to c. 350–340 BC

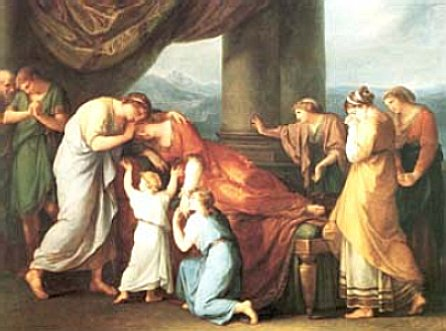
The Death of Alcestis by Angelica Kauffmann.

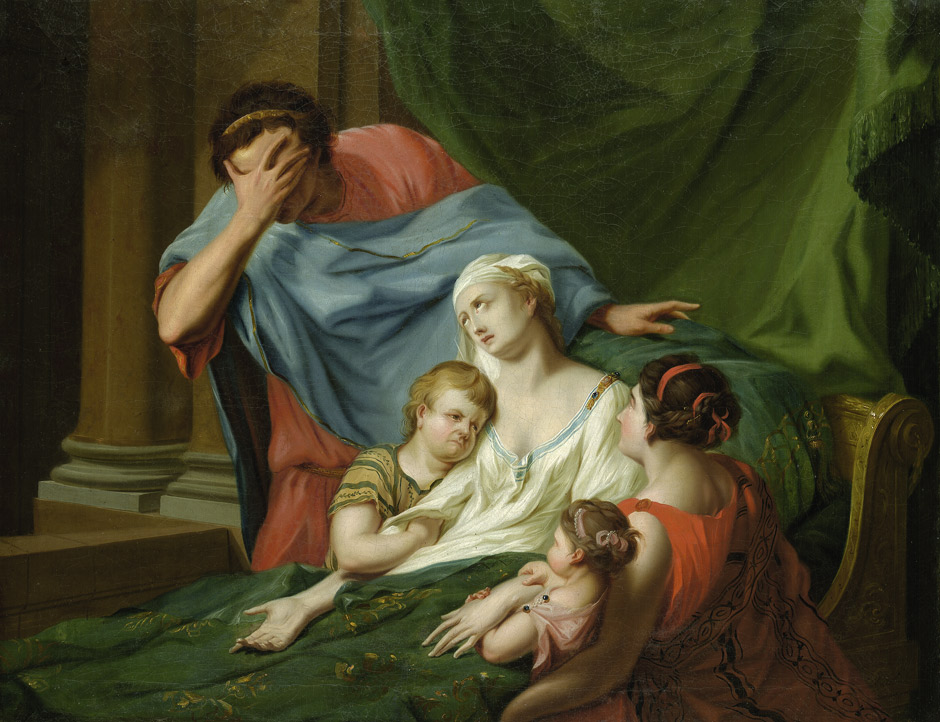
Admetus beweint Alkeste by Johann Heinrich Tischbein (circa 1780)

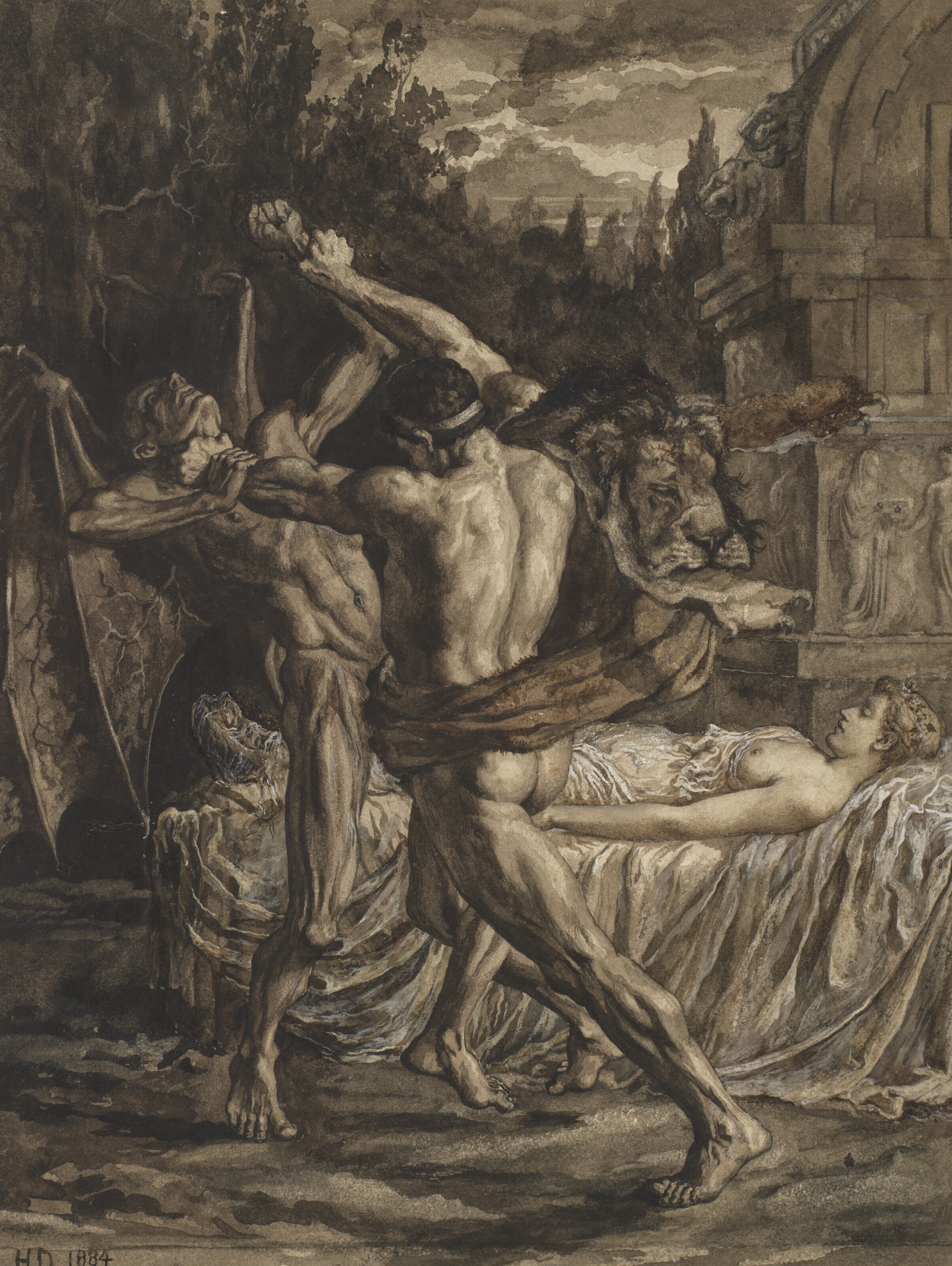
Herbert Thomas Dicksee, Hercules Wrestling with Death for the Soul of Alcestis, 1884, private collection

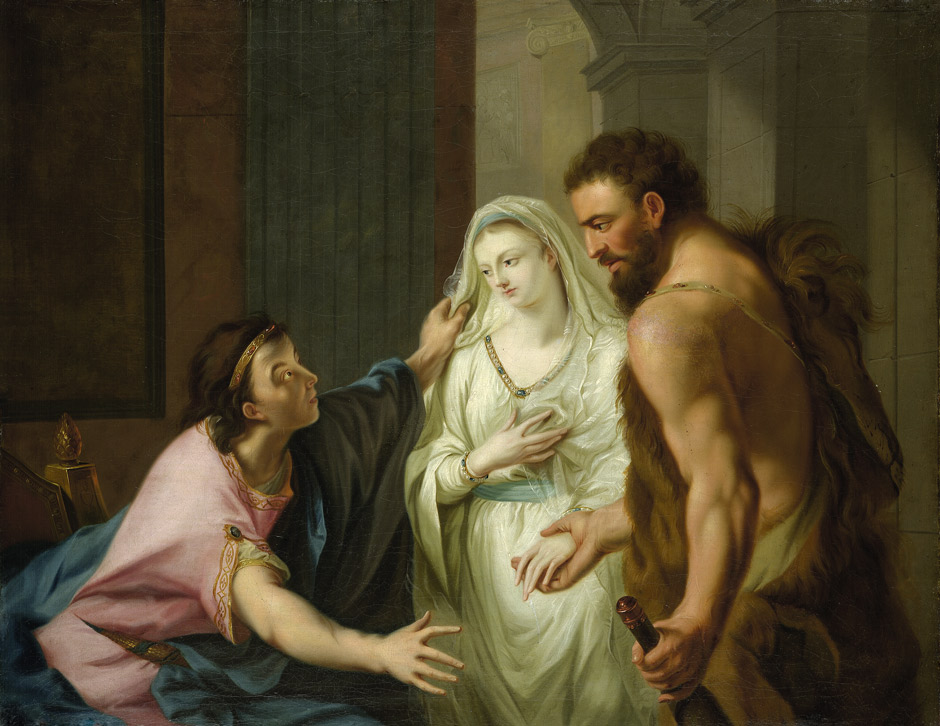
Herkules entreißt Alkestis dem Totengott Thanatos und führt sie dem Admetus zu by Johann Heinrich Tischbein (circa 1780)

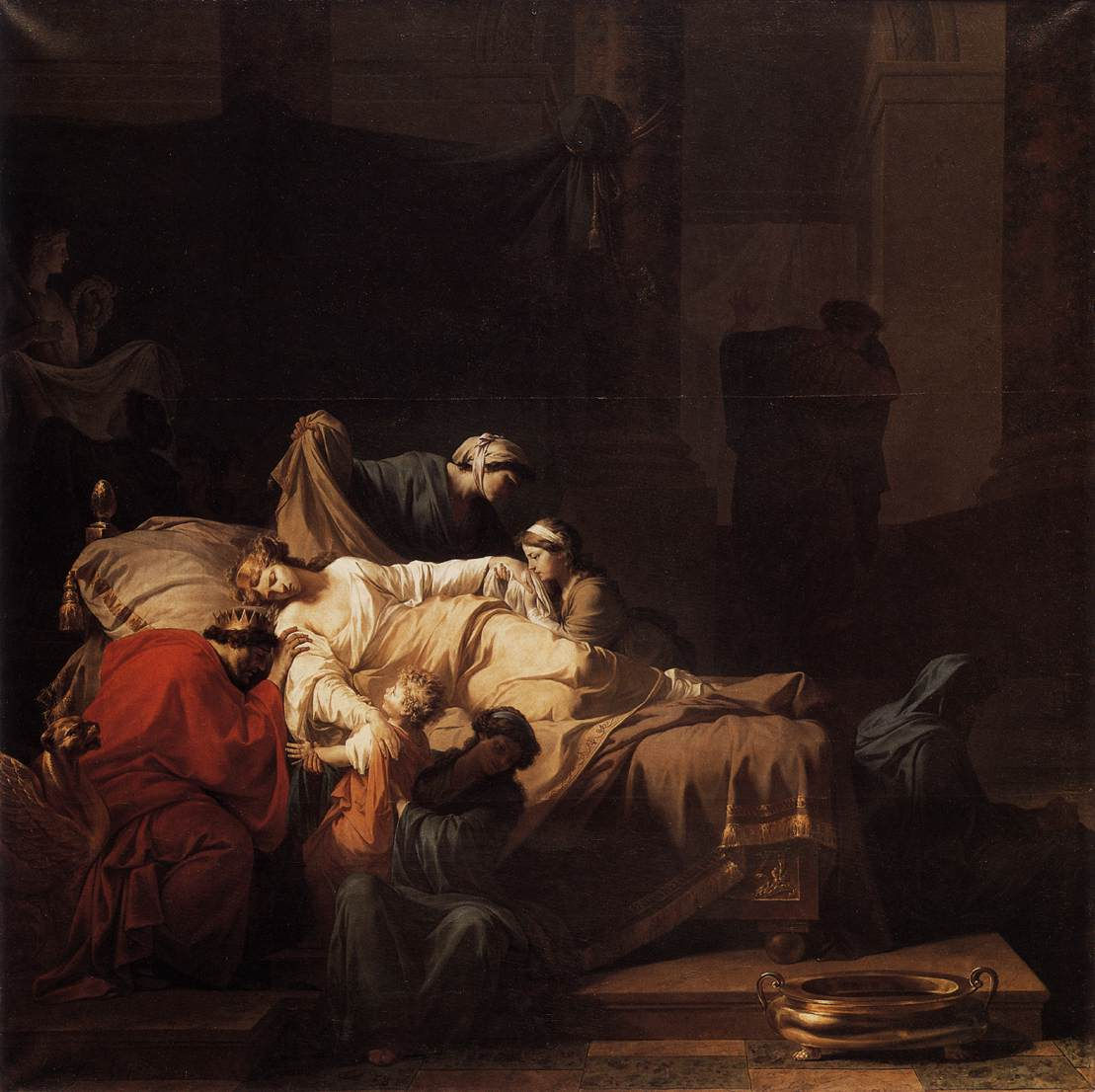
Alceste mourante by Jean-François Pierre Peyron (1785)

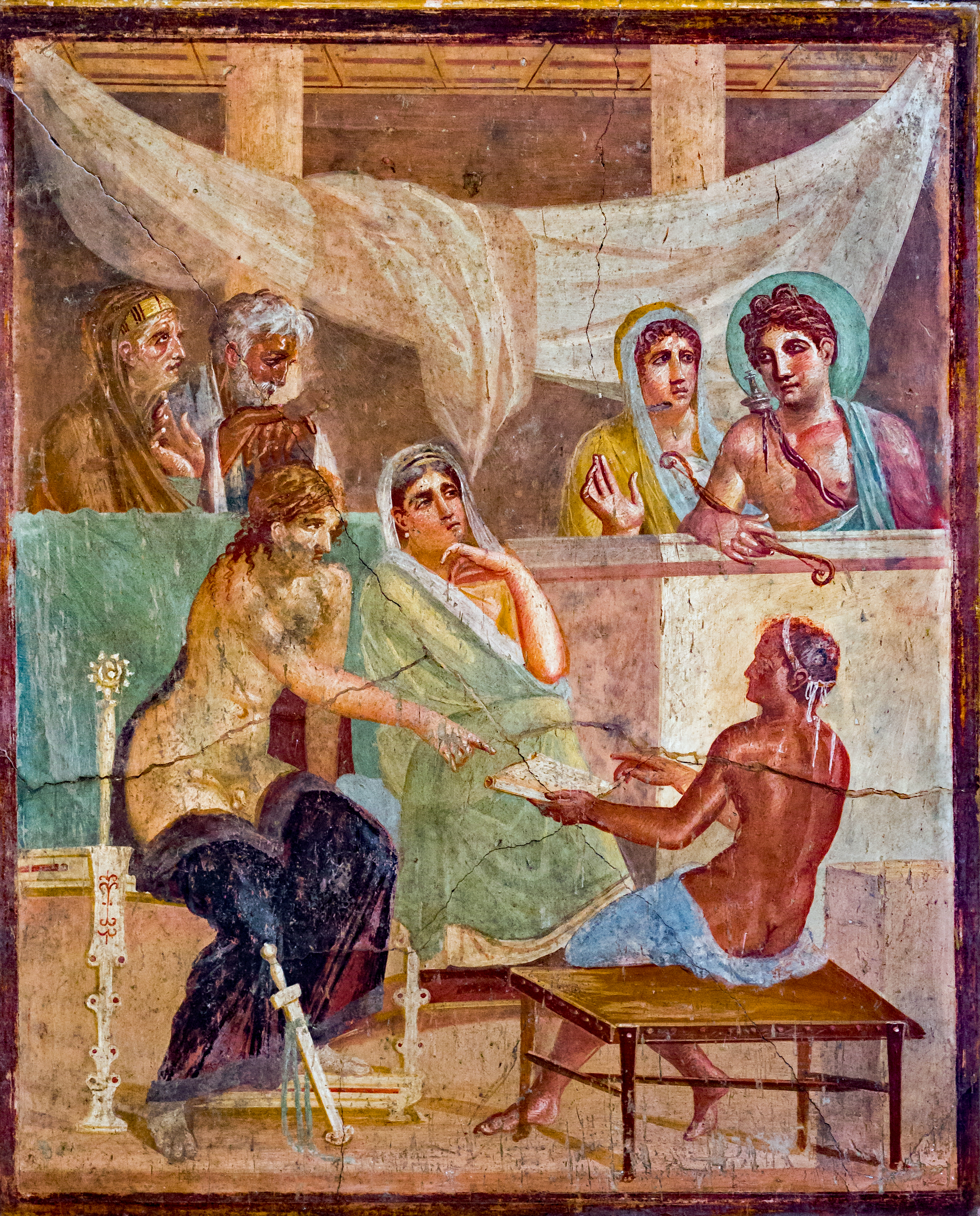
Alcestis and Admetus, ancient Roman fresco (45–79 CE.) from the House of the Tragic Poet, Pompeii, Italy
