= Periopis =

Daughter of Pheres in Greek mythology

In Greek mythology, Periopis (Ancient Greek: Περίωπις) was a princess of Pherae as daughter of King Pheres and possibly, Periclymene, daughter of King Minyas of Orchomenus.
