= Chorus of the elderly in classical Greek drama =

Common trope in Ancient Greek theatre

The chorus of the elderly in classical Greek drama is a common trope in the theater of that period. Out of the thirty or so plays that are extant from the classical period, seven have choruses that consist of elderly people. Choruses in ancient drama often provided some moralizing lesson to the protagonist, especially in tragedy. However, the figures of the elderly chorus often seem to imply a traditional way of thinking that has become outdated with time, or, in some cases, provide a model of inefficacy. As history progressed from the early stages of Greek drama (with Aeschylus) the chorus became more integrated with the happenings on stage, rendering the chorus a messenger between the world of the audience and that of the actors.

== Tragedy ==
The chorus of the elderly within Greek tragedy is often used as an exemplar of old social mores. They are often ineffectual at admonishing main actors or interfering with the main plot. Sophocles in Oedipus at Colonus uses the chorus to relate to the ageing protagonist, who has wandered to the town for safety. A common trope is that the elderly chorus provides sympathy and empathy for those in need as they too are in a deteriorating state, nearing their doom. The chorus of elders not only attempt to protect Oedipus but fail miserably; while the chorus speaks aggressively it is well known that they are too frail to attempt any sort of defense of the protagonist from physical harm. Similar outcomes of choral interference with onstage happenings occur in many other plays, including Agamemnon. Falkner notes that in tragedy the elderly are presented as quixotic and obsessed with the prospect of doom inherent in old age; he also notes that often the elderly are presented as mourners within plays, perhaps relating to the number of sorrows old age allows one to accrue in mind.

== Comedy ==
Aristophanes uses the chorus of the elderly for varying reasons within his comedies. For example, the chorus of the elderly within The Wasps plays both a comedic role and also serves as a political counterfoil to the young, cosmopolitans of Athens.

== Plays ==
- The Wasps
- Lysistrata
- Oedipus Rex
- Orestes
- The Suppliants
- Agamemnon
- Alcestis
- Heracleidae
