= Children of Heracles =

Ancient Greek tragedy by Euripides

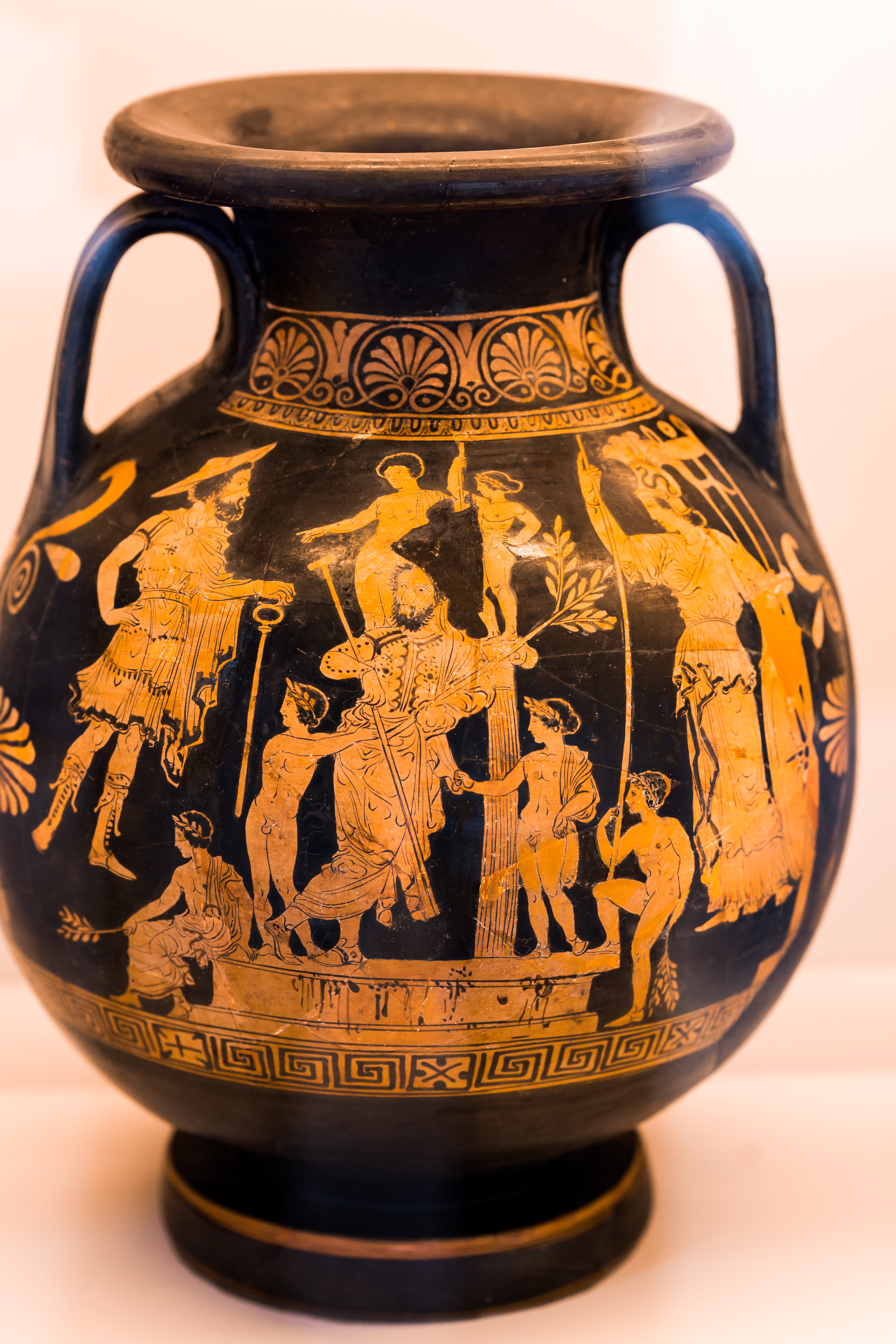
- Lucanian red-figure pelike with a depiction of the opening scene of Euripides' Children of Heracles
- Original language: Ancient Greek
- Written by: Euripides
- Chorus: aged Athenians
- Characters: Iolaus; Copreus; Demophon; Macaria; Servant of Hyllus; Alcmene; Messenger; Eurystheus
- Mute: Acamas; Children of Heracles; Followers
- Genre: Tragedy
- Setting: Before the temple of Zeus at Marathon

Premiere
- Place: Athens

Children of Heracles (Ancient Greek: Ἡρακλεῖδαι, Hērakleidai; also translated as Herakles' Children and Heraclidae) is an Athenian tragedy written by Euripides. In the year of 430 B.C., Children of Heracles was performed. It follows the children of Heracles (known as the Heraclidae) as they seek protection from Eurystheus. It is the first of two surviving tragedies by Euripides where the children of Heracles are suppliants (the second being Heracles).

== Background ==
Children of Heracles was written by Euripides. Euripides would eventually become the most famous playwright compared to Aeschylus and Sophocles. The majority of his plays oppose war. There are ninety-two plays written by Euripides. However, only nineteen plays have been recovered.

In 430 B.C., the Peloponnesian War was just beginning and the relationship between the Spartans and Athenians was tense. The Athenians killed many Spartan envoys, as stated by the historian Thucydides. Euripides depicted the brutality he witnessed during his life into the play.

The play's title is significant and unique due to Greek tragedies either being named after a main character, the chorus or an event within the play. The play does not do this. Because of its title, Children of Heracles stands out.

== Themes ==
The themes in Children of Heracles focus on the bravery of women, revenge, and the hardships and consequences of war. The play also focuses on heroism due to the actions of the characters. Suffering and grief can be noted as well.

== Plot ==
The principal characters in Children of Heracles are Eurystheus, the king of Mycenae and a tyrant who was responsible for Heracles's labours; Iolaus, Heracles's old friend who provides protection to the children; Demophon, the king of Athens, son of Theseus, and an ally; Macaria, Heracles's daughter, and Alcmene, Heracles's elderly mother. Other characters include Hyllus, Heracles's eldest son and the herald Copreus.

The play begins at the altar of Zeus at Marathon where Heracles's children, Iolaus and Alcmene take shelter. King Eurystheus is determined to kill the children, wary that they will want to avenge their father. Copreus, in the employ of Eurystheus, attempts to seize the children and Iolaus. Iolaus begs for help, and King Demophon arrives. He declares that Iolaus and Heracles's children are under his protection. With tensions rising, Copreus threatens to return with an army.

Demophon is prepared to protect the children even at the cost of fighting a war against Eurystheus, but after consulting with the oracles, he learns that the Athenians will be victorious only if they sacrifice a maiden of noble birth to the goddess Persephone, "They bid me to sacrifice a maiden to the daughter of Demeter, a maiden daughter of a noble father, to rout the enemy and save the city." Reluctant, Demophon tells Iolaus that as much as he would like to help, he will not sacrifice his own daughter or compel any of the Athenians to do so. Iolaus, realizing that he and the children will have to leave Athens and seek refuge elsewhere, despairs.

Known as the Maiden in the play, Macaria hears the oracle's announcement. Realizing her family's predicament, she courageously offers herself as the sacrificial victim, refusing a lottery among other girls. She bids farewell to her siblings and to a grieving Iolaus, "Farewell, old man, farewell! Please train up [575] these boys to be such men as yourself, wise for every occasion, not more wise than that: that will suffice. With all your zeal try to save them from death. We are your children, we have been raised by your hands. You see that I am offering my young womanhood [580] and about to die in their place." Macaria is led away to be sacrificed.

Hyllus arrives with reinforcements and Iolaus insists on joining the battle. During the fight, Iolaus miraculously regains his youth and captures Eurystheus. Alcmene furiously orders that Eurystheus be executed immediately for the grief he has caused them, though such an execution is against Athenian law. Eurystheus accepts his fate and tells them a prophecy of how his spirit will protect the city from the descendants of Heracles's children if they slay and bury him, "And you shall have a double profit from me: by dying I shall bring benefit to you and harm to the Heraclids." Eurystheus is then escorted away to be executed and the play ends.

== Reception ==
There has been mixed reviews regarding Children of Heracles. The play was not popular, and had been deemed by Ulrich von Wilamowitz-Moellendorff, an expert on ancient Greek literature, to be irrelevant. Most critics were bothered by Macaria's sacrifice, as it is an abrupt decision on her part, and Iolaus's behavior regarding her sacrifice is another issue, as he wishes to bear no responsibility for her decision. Concerning the completion of the play, there is much debate as well. The play was not considered to be a success as readers and critics were dismissive of it. Also, the play was quite misunderstood due to its themes. In retrospect, Children of Heracles is now deemed to be a laudable play by Euripides.

== Translations ==
- Robert Potter, 1781 - verse: full text
- Edward P. Coleridge, 1891, prose, The Heracleidae: full text
- Arthur S. Way, 1912, verse
- Ralph Gladstone, 1955, verse
- Henry Taylor and Robert A. Brooks, 1981, The Children of Herakles
- David Kovacs, 1994, prose, Heracleidae: full text
- John Davie, 1996, Children of Heracles
- Kenneth McLeish, 1997, Herakles' Children
- George Theodoridis, 2010, prose, Herakleidae: full text
- Mark Griffith, 2013, The Children of Heracles

== Sources ==
- Burian, Peter, and Alan Shapiro, eds. 2010. The Complete Euripides. By Euripides. Vol. 3. The Greek Tragedy in New Translations ser. Oxford and New York: Oxford. ISBN 0-19-538877-1.
- Davie, John, trans. 2003. Medea and Other Plays. By Euripides. London and New York: Penguin. ISBN 0-14-044929-9.
- Walton, J. Michael, and Kenneth McLeish, eds. 1997. Plays: V. By Euripides. Methuen Classical Greek Dramatists ser. London: Methuen. ISBN 0-413-71640-6.
