= Sport in ancient Greek art =

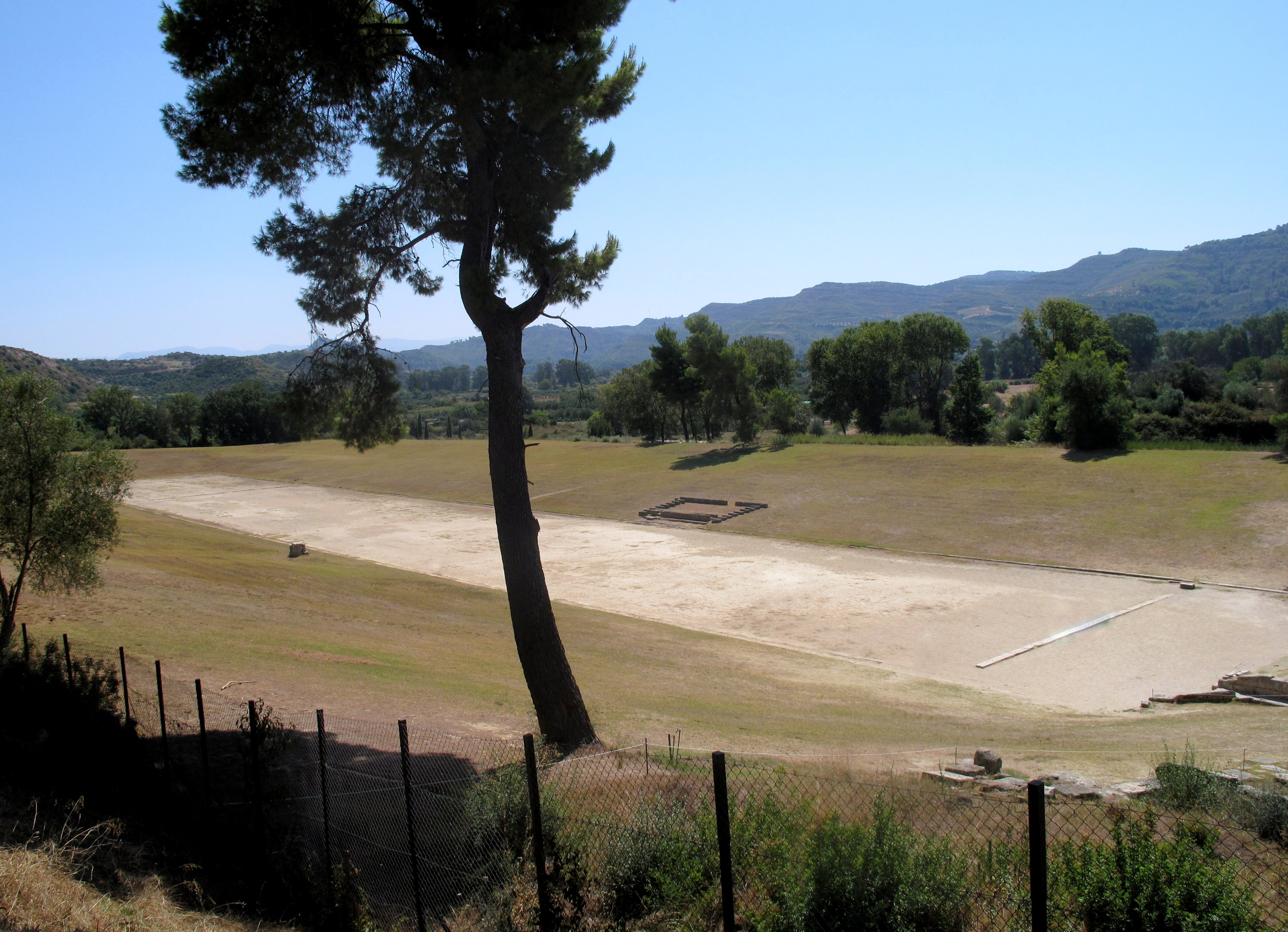
Birth of the Olympic Games in the Stadium at Olympia

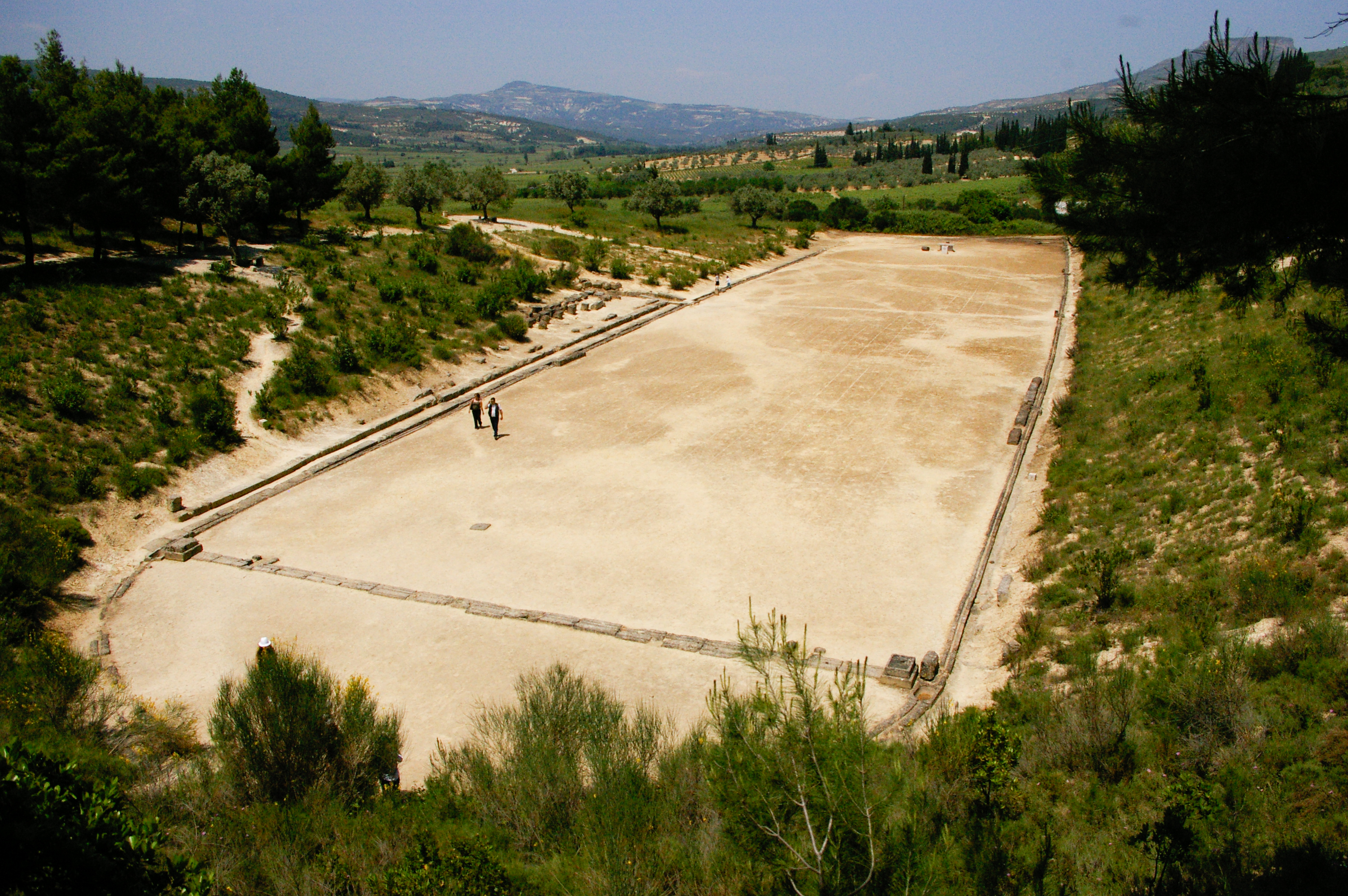
Stadion of Nemea

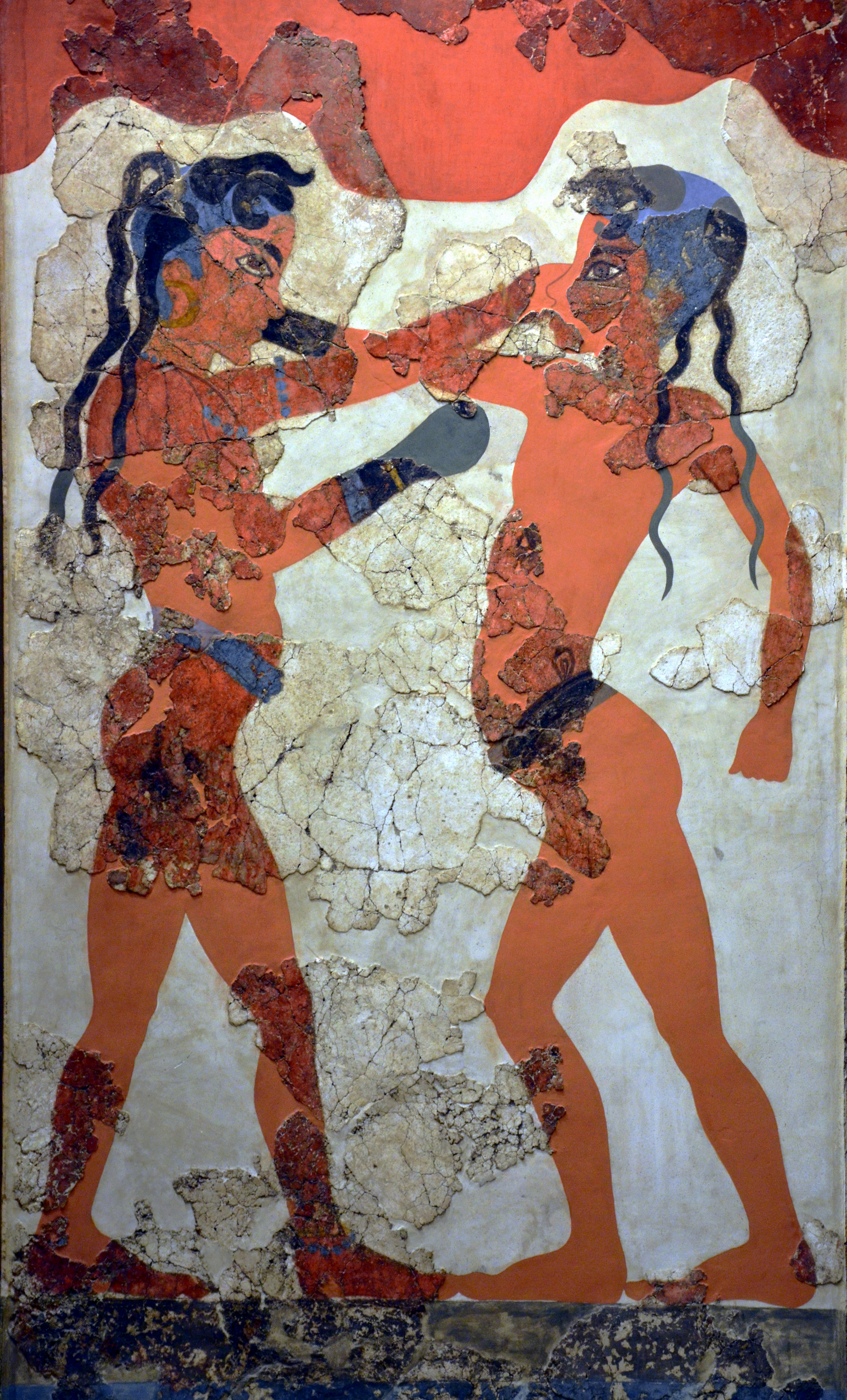
Akrotiri Boxer Fresco from Thera

Athletics were an important part of the cultural life of Ancient Greeks. Depictions of boxing and bull-leaping can be found back to the Bronze Age. Buildings were created for the sole use of athletics including stadia, palaestrae, and gymnasiums. Starting in the Archaic period, Panhellenic Games, including the Olympic Games, begin taking place each year. These games gave people from all over Greece the chance to gain fame for their athletic prowess. Athletics in Greece became one of the most commonly depicted scenes of everyday life in their art.

== Architecture relating to athletics ==
As the site of the Olympic Games, the architecture of Olympia is heavily influenced by the theme of athletics. The Temple of Zeus, for example, is decorated with a frieze containing the Labours of Hercules, who is believed to be the founder of the Olympic Games, and a pediment depicting the myth of Pelops, another origin tale of the Olympics.

The main site of where the Olympic Games took place was the Stadium at Olympia, which is located to the east of the sanctuary of Zeus. The physical landmarks of the Stadium are 212.54 meters long and 30–34 meters wide, and it served mainly for running races that determined the fastest person in the world. The track was made of hard-packed clay to serve as traction for the people competing in the running events.

The site of Nemea showcase both the practical and ceremonial use of athletic architecture in the early Hellenistic monumentalization of Panhellenic sanctuaries. The bath house Nemean Baths contains a western room with basin baths and an eastern plunge bath. The western basin room is common of 4th century baths throughout Greece and was likely place where visiting athletes could wash themselves during their stay. The eastern plunge bath however, is one of only four others in Greece, all of which have been found at Panhellenic ritual sites. Though its exact function is unknown, its public nature suggests that it may have had a ritual component in the athletic games or ceremonies. Nemea also housed a stadium, where athletes would participate in games, specifically the stadion (running race).

== Depictions of games ==
During the Bronze Age, the Minoans practiced several sports, including wrestling, bull jumping, acrobatics, and boxing. This is apparent in multiple pieces of art, ranging from frescoes to pottery. The youth of the boys in the Akrotiri Boxer Fresco hints that athletes began training very early on in life, suggesting that sports were extremely important to Minoan society. It has even been suggested that athletics played a religious role in society due to their widespread practice. Finally, the youth of athletes in many pieces of artwork indicates that athletic competition may have been a rite if passage into adulthood for the Minoans.

One of the most popular and famous combat sports in Ancient Greece was boxing. Boxing in Ancient Greece was far less regulated than modern boxing, with opponents chosen at random, regardless of weight or age, and matches lasting until one of the competitors admitted defeat or was left unconscious. Fighters were often left disfigured; for example, one boxing injury commonly depicted was the cauliflower ear, which was depicted notably in the Boxer Stele from Kerameikos. Many who participated in these ancient boxing matches were gravely injured or even killed. Despite this, boxing was highly popular among the Ancient Grecian population and therefore was frequently featured on works of art. Another notable depiction of an ancient boxer is Boxer at Rest, also known as Terme Boxer, who has just finished a match. For example, the kothon, black-figure tripod by the Boeotian Dancer's Group features two men engaged in a boxing match on one of its legs.

Athletic events, particularly Panhellenic festivals, drew both athletes and spectators. Occurrences of athletic competitions were first recorded by Homer in the Iliad. As a result, competitions had ties with war and military training. Depictions of athletic events in ancient art sometimes show the athletes wearing armor in order to illustrate the connection between athletes and warriors.

Depictions of athletic events were also portrayed on pieces of pottery used in everyday life. Artists like Onesimos and the Foundry Painter depicted events such as pancration scenes and wrestling matches on kylixes which were then used at symposiums or male drinking parties. Both of these painters used the red-figure technique, developed in Athens in 530 B.C., in their work and this technique allowed them to have greater freedom to express movement, emotion, and anatomy.

The depictions of Athletic events in Art expanded as major athletic events also expanded. In 708 BCE, the pentathlon was added to the Olympic games. Since this event required the skills for five different events (discus, javelin, long jump, running, and wrestling) these athletes were held in high regard among society. It became common to have a kylix or an amphora depict these events, and in turn, it praised the athletes by leaving their legacy in the art.

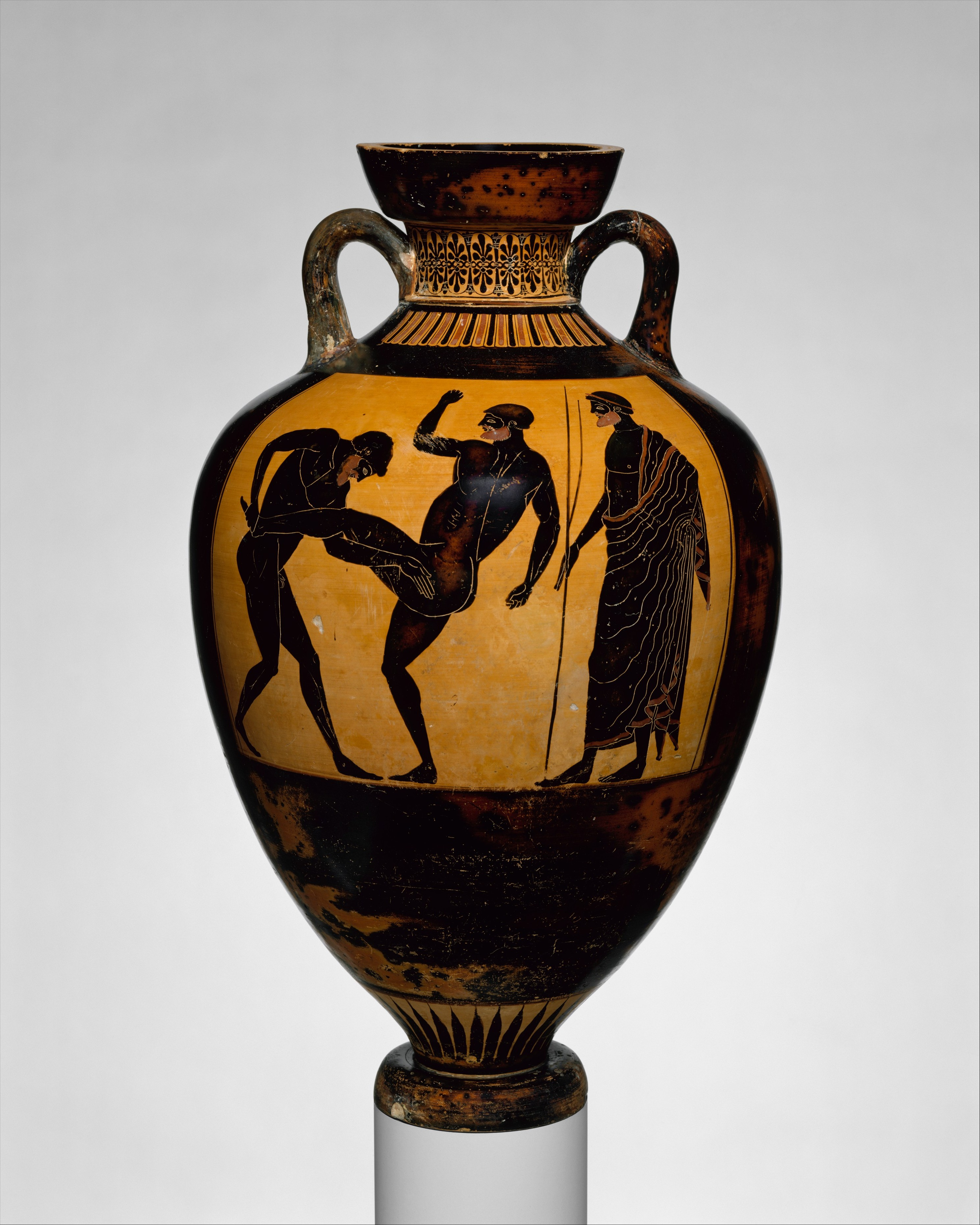
Panathenaic prize amphora by the Kleophrades Painter

The Kleophrades terracotta Panathenaic prize amphora (ca. 500 BCE) provides an example of recognition for success in athletic endeavors. At the Panathenaic Games, victors would be awarded a prize amphora filled with a luxury good like olive oil. The amphora itself would depict Athena Promachos, or Athena as a military leader directing troops into battle, and the athletic event in which the victor competed. Recognition for athletic endeavors and success by depicting the event itself as this Panathenaic prize amphora does highlights just how important athleticism was to the Ancient Greeks. Another example of the many Panathenaic Prize Amphoras is the Euphiletos Painter Panathenaic Amphora (530 BC). Painted in black figure, this Panathenaic amphora depicts a stadion from Panathenaic games. Like other prize amphora, this amphora serves to emphasize athleticism and the victors of these events.

Descriptions of women’s sport during Archaic Period mainly come from literary sources, and there are a few examples of female sporting events. One of the most popular forms of physical activity for ancient Greek women is running. The bronze statuettes of athletic Spartan girl, which depicts Spartan young women involving in racing games, provide material evidence to the accounts of different women’s races in ancient Greece.

== Athletic dedications ==
The prominence of athletic subject material in Greek art is no coincidence. Even statuary, called Athletic Dedications, arose as a way to immortalize Greek athletes and athletic games. Athletic events and art were so closely related that a common practice of athletes was to commemorate their victories with artistic dedications. One example of this would be the marble Apobates Base which commemorates victory in a chariot race at the Panathenaic Games. A competitor would erect a dedication to celebrate an athletic victory and place it in a sanctuary or Panhellenic site. These dedications were an artistic celebration of athletic prowess which every Greek could observe.

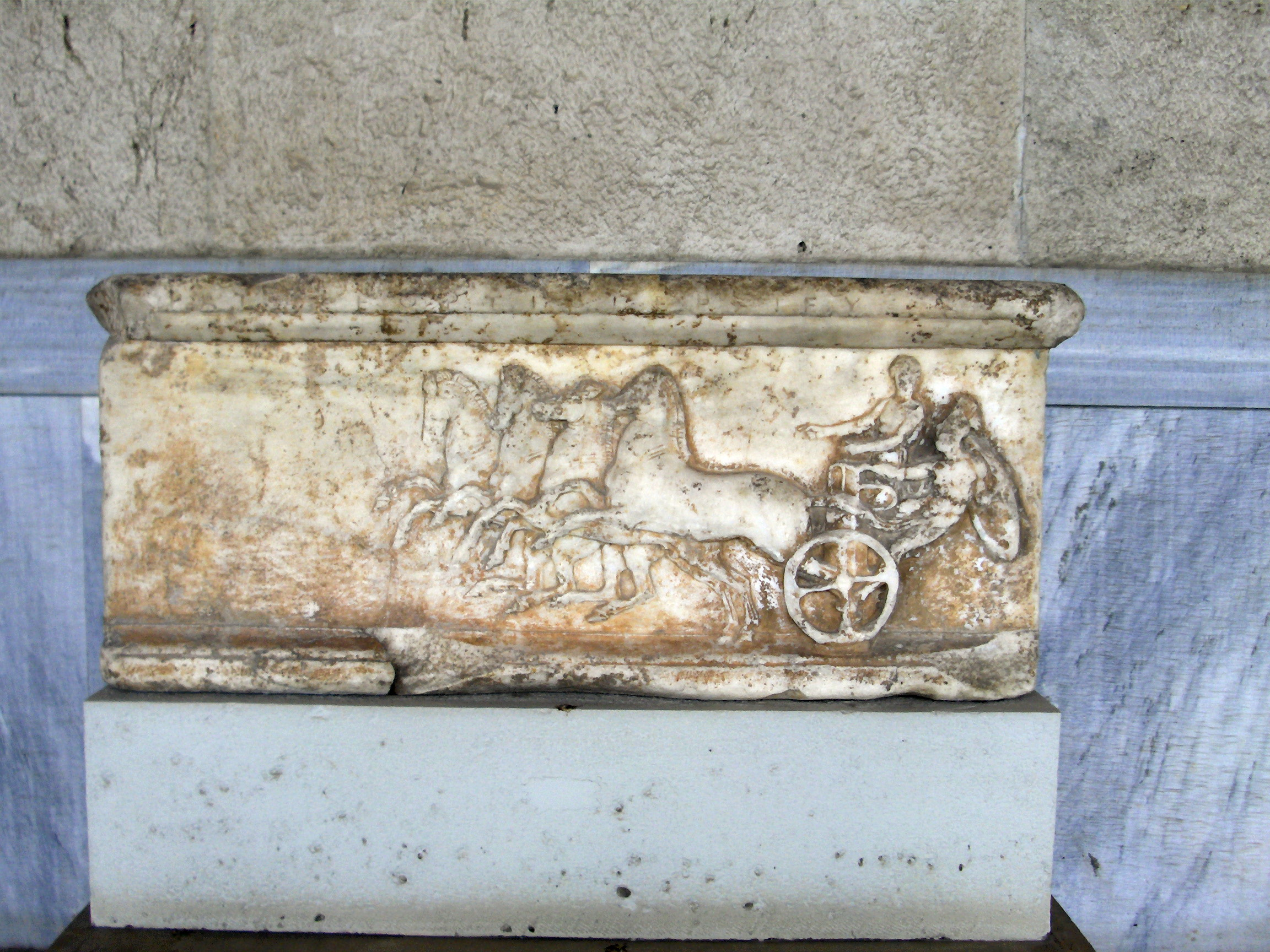
Apobates Base

As part of the games taking place at Olympia, many individuals competed in the pentathlon, a competition consisting of five events. The Ancient Olympic Pentathlon consisted of the discus throw, long jumps with weights attached to their feet, javelin throw, running, and wrestling. Many victors of the pentathlon would go on to receive prizes such as exclusive items that were made specifically for the victor. For example, the amphorae of the Panathenaic Games, often filled with expensive olive oil, featured Athena standing with a sword and shield to represent their victory in the games. Because the Olympics were dedicated to Zeus, often these prizes would become votive dedications to him.

The Bronze Diskos Thrower (Discobolus) was a rare commodity that came from a time in which not many pieces survived: the end of the Persian Wars. The piece itself still exhibits many traits of archaic art, despite coming from the early Classical period (480 - 460 BCE). The athlete in the statue was a participant of diskos throwing, a very popular event in Ancient Greece and even modern day Olympics.
