= Kleophrades Painter =

Athenian vase painter

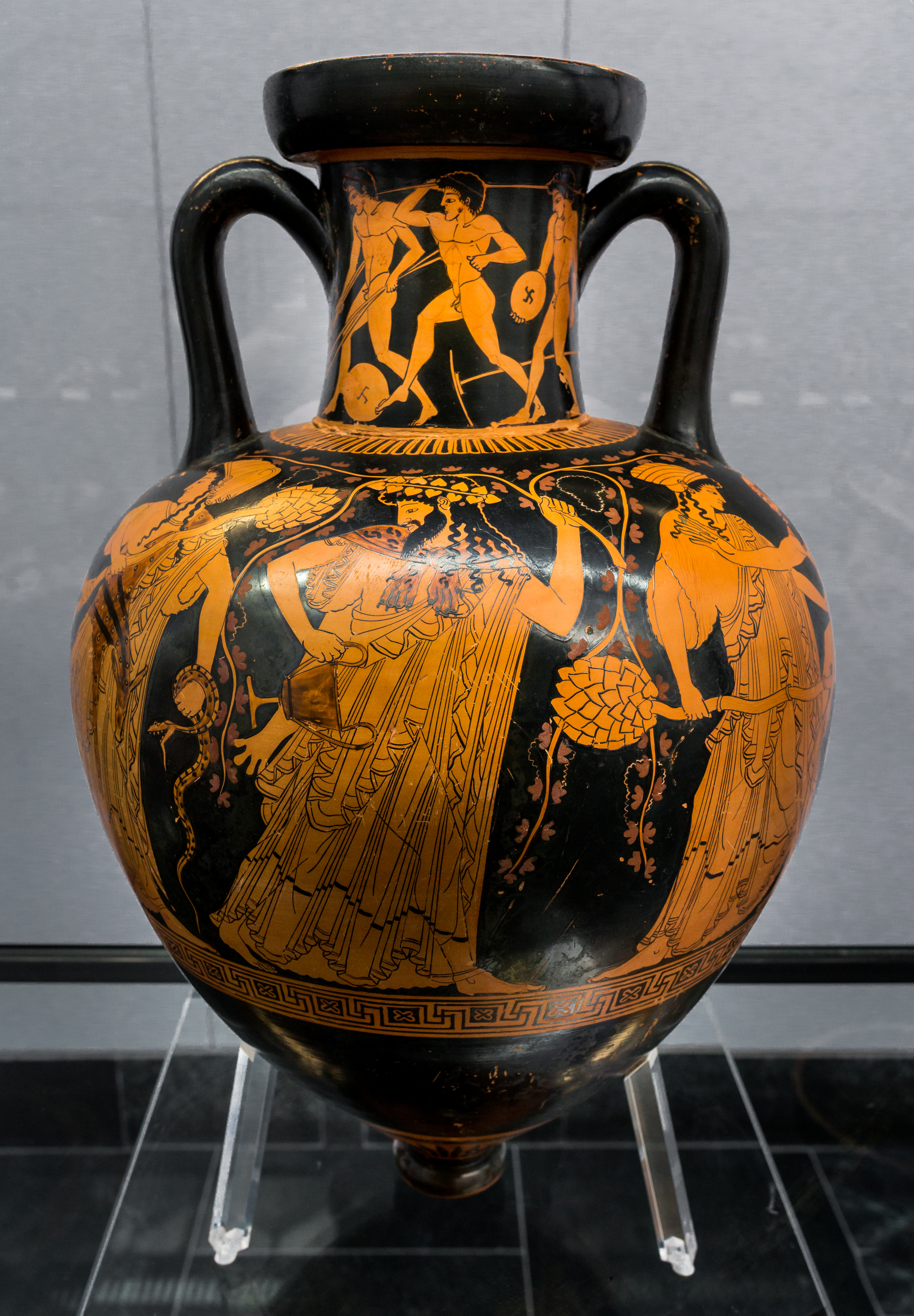
Dionysos with maenads and satyrs. Munich, Staatliche Antikensammlungen 2344

The Kleophrades Painter is the name given to the anonymous red-figure Athenian vase painter, who was active from approximately 510–470 BC and whose work, considered among the finest of the red-figure tradition, is identified by its stylistic traits.

== Name and identity ==
The name "Kleophrades Painter", given him in 1910 by classicist John Beazley, arises from a potter's inscription Kleophrades on a cup now in the Cabinet des Medailles, Paris; after having had this designation for some time, scholars discovered a pelike, now in Berlin, which has the painter's name Epiktetos inscribed on it, and the painter was for a time designated Epiktetos II, distinguishing him from a contemporary painter of the same name.

However, in 1981 John Boardman demonstrated that the signature on the vase was a modern forgery, and the Kleophrades Painter returned to anonymity. The Kleophrades Painter is thought to be the son of the potter Amasis, and the pupil of Euthymides, as his earliest work greatly resembles that of his master. He himself had pupils, which include the Berlin Painter and also the Boot Painter. Overall, the Kleophrades Painter is recognized as one of the greatest pot painters in the late Archaic period in Athens.

== Forms ==
The Beazley Archive Pottery Database has approximately 227 vases either attributed to, near, or compared with the Kleophrades Painter, and of these 227, 113 are directly attributed to this great painter, although aside from the potter's name on the one pelike, his name is not found anywhere. Although he painted a number of different shapes, the Kleophrades Painter focused mostly on large vases, with the four most common shapes being calyx, hydrias, Panathenaic amphorae, and neck amphorae. The provenances of these vases vary, although the great majority are found in Italy. Most of which were sent to Etruria, Vulci, which is now the modern Province of Viterbo. This evidence indicates that many of his vases were intended for export.

== Figural subjects and style ==
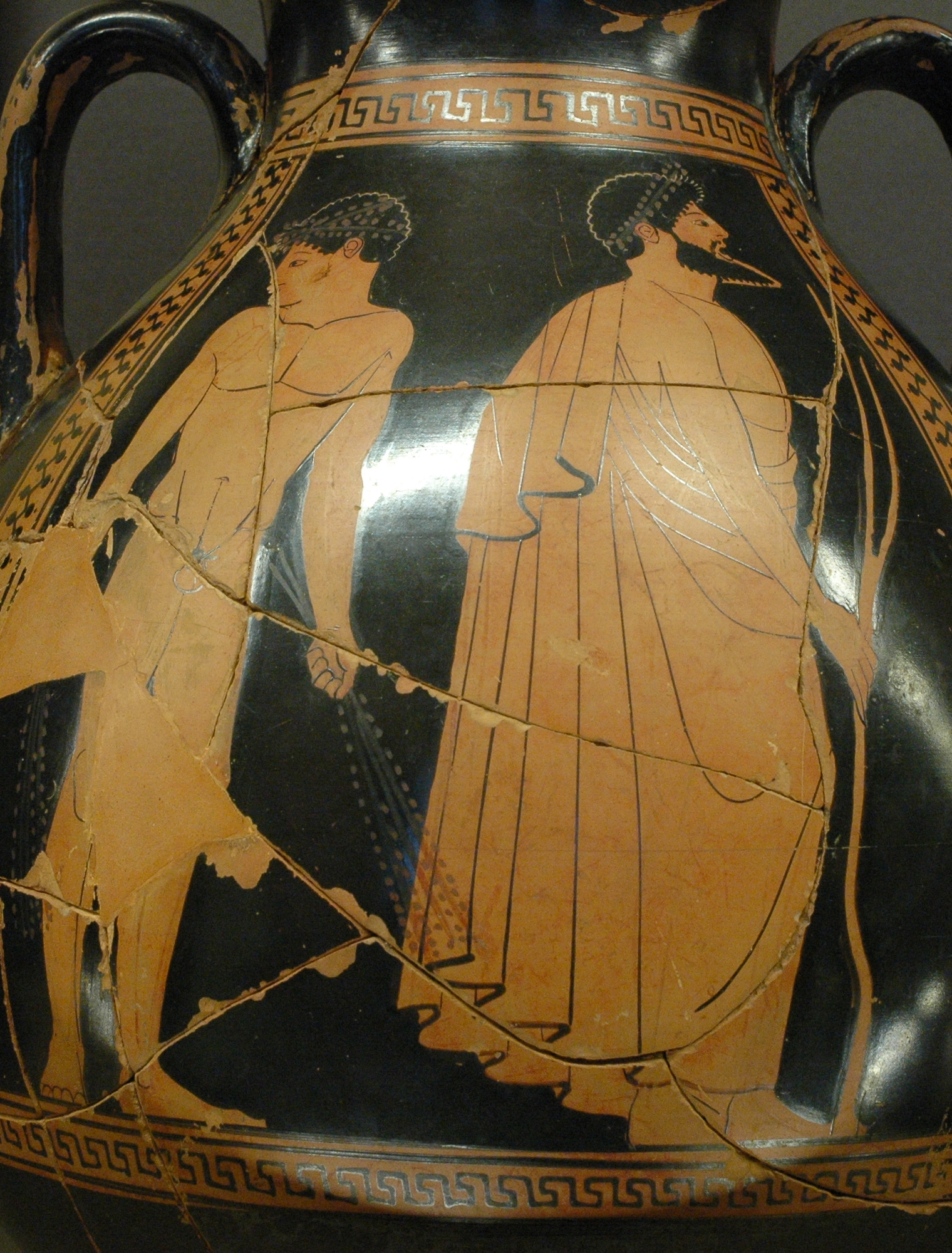
A pædotribe (gymnastics teacher) and one of his athletes. Side B of an Attic red-figure pelike by the Kleophrades Painter, ca. 500 BC–490 BC. Louvre (G 235).

Although the Kleophrades Painter was not a member of the Pioneer Group of red-figure painters, it is suggested that he worked in the Pioneer workshop. The Pioneer workshop included Euphronios, Euthymides, Smikros, Hypsias, and the Dikaios Painter. Beazley as well as Michael Padgett believe that Kleophrades not only worked in the Pioneer workshop, but Kleophrades was also trained and taught by Euthymides. Euthymides is older and had a clear influence on Kleophrades based on technique and style. He may have started off his training as a black-figure painter, given that on his earliest vases all of the borders and patterns surrounding the painted scenes are done in black-figure.

In addition to being trained in both black and red-figure, Kleophrades also used the white ground technique. Kleophrades did use it often and when the painter did it was a sub technique of his black-figure works. As he progresses, one side of the vase will have patterns in black figure, and the other in red, until finally, in his later work, all of the borders and patterns are done in red figure. The attribution of the Kleophrades painter’s work is based on the expressive emotions of his characters, and his work is particularly identifiable through study of his painted faces. The eyes of his figures are often drawn rather long and slender, accompanied by strong chins, and a unique way of showing the inner detail of the ear.

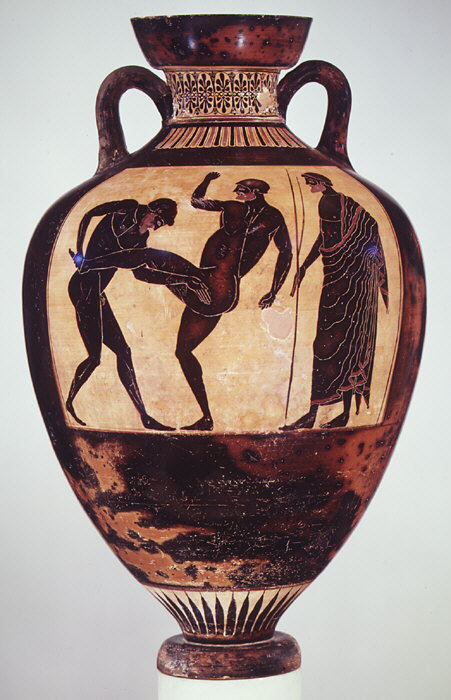
The Kleophrades Painter Panathenaic prize amphora, c. 500 BC. Metropolitan Museum of Art

Although working primarily in red-figure (apart from the borders and patterns previously mentioned), the Kleophrades Painter completed a number of Panathenaic amphorae, many of which were actually used as prizes. All Panathenaic amphorae, not only those by the Kleophrades Painter, are done in black-figure, and his personal pots show great proficiency in this style. The Panathenaic amphorae by the Kleophrades Painter can be recognized by the representation of Pegasus, the winged horse, on the shield carried by Athena, the manner in which her hair is represented, and the position of the spear behind Athena’s head, as well as the relation of the spear to her face.

The Kleophrades Painter's style is praised for the quality of the draughtsmanship, as well as for the vigorous, robust, and well-proportioned figures that he depicted. His influence has been seen in the work of the Boot Painter and the Troilos Painter. In this latter case, the two artists have decorated vessels apparently by the same potter produced at roughly the same time, making it appear likely that they may have been working in the same workshop.

== See also ==
- Pottery of ancient Greece

== References and sources ==
Sources

- Beazley Archive, University of Oxford - The Kleophrades Painter
- Beazley, J. D. ABV. 2nd ed. Vol. 1. Hacker Art Books, New York, 1978. Print.
- Beazley, J. D. Paralipomena: Additions to Attic Black-figure Vase-painters and to Attic Red-figure Vase-painters (second edition),. Oxford: Clarendon, 1971.
- Beazley, J. D. The Kleophrades Painter. Mainz: Verlag P. Von Zabern, 1974.
- Folsom, Robert S. Attic Red Figure Pottery. Park City, NJ: Noyes, 1976. Print.
- Matheson, Susan B. "Panathenaic Amphorae by the Kleophrades Painter." Greek Vases in the J. Paul Getty Museum 4 (1989): 95-112. Print.
- Kleophrades essay&redirect=true Michael Padgett, "The Kleophrades Painter, Introduction." Perseus Digital Library. Accessed 15 December 2010.
