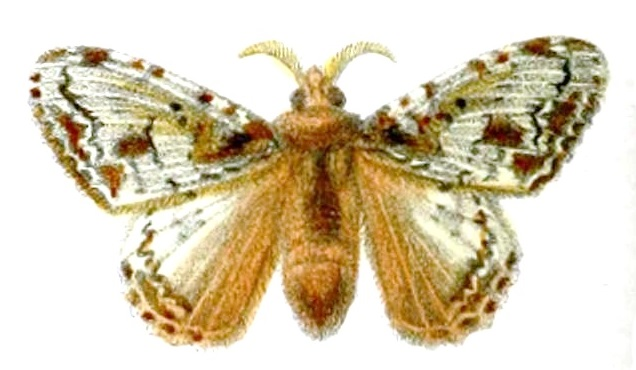

Scientific classification
- Kingdom: Animalia
- Phylum: Arthropoda
- Class: Insecta
- Order: Lepidoptera
- Family: Lasiocampidae
- Genus: Euglyphis
- Species: E. ampira

Binomial name
- Euglyphis ampira (H. Druce, 1890)

Synonyms
- Hydrias ampira H. Druce, 1890

= Euglyphis ampira =

Species of moth

Euglyphis ampira is a species of moth of the family Lasiocampidae first described by Herbert Druce in 1890. It is found in Ecuador.
