= Bronze Diskos Thrower Statue =

Bronze Diskos Thrower
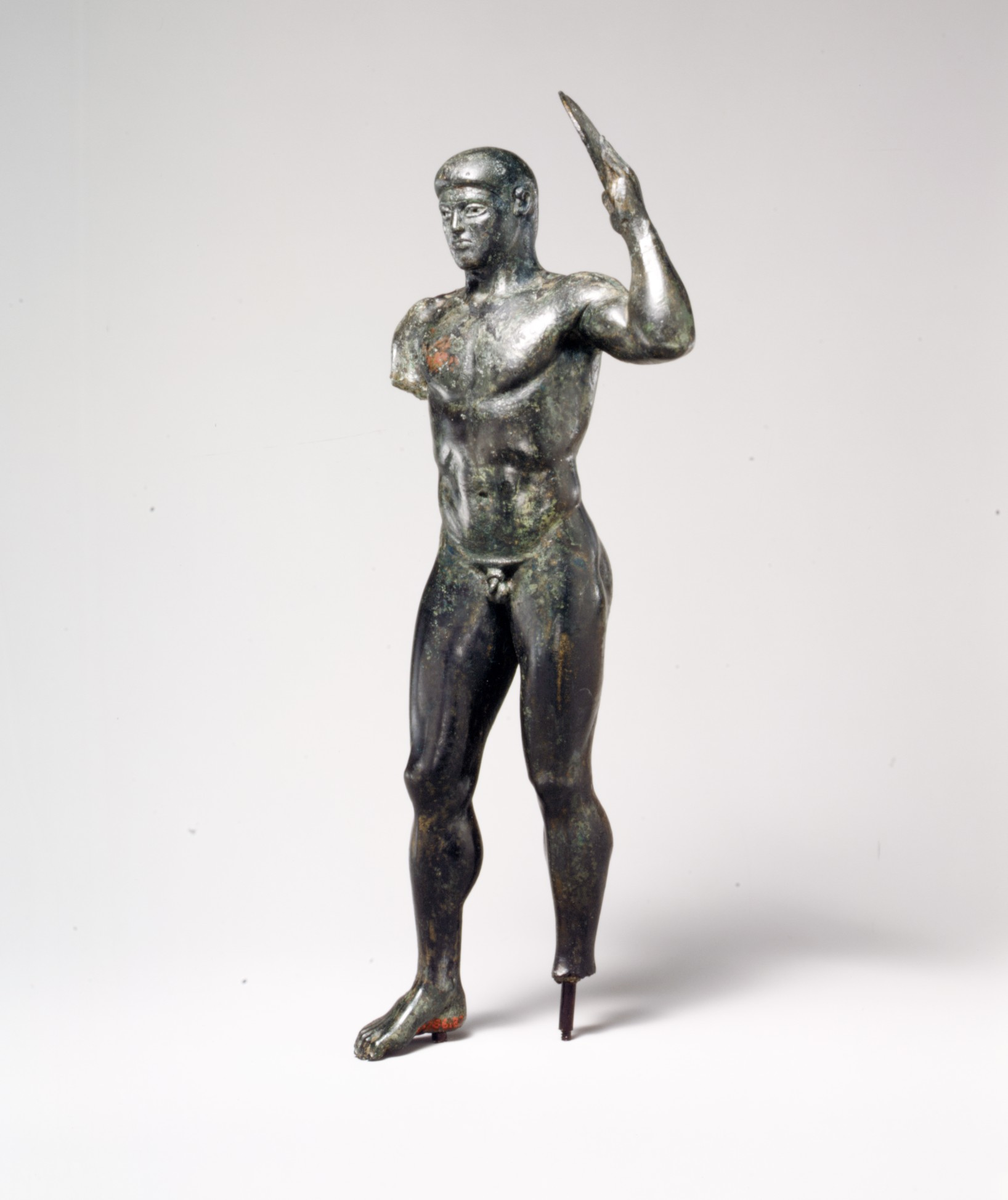
- Artist: Unknown
- Year: 480–460 BCE
- Type: Bronze
- Location: The Met; New York City

The Bronze Diskos Thrower Statue is a 24.51 cm bronze statue of an unknown youth athlete. The exact origin of the statue remains unknown, though it is believed to be somewhere on the Peloponnese. It was found on the island of Cyprus. The statue is currently displayed at the Metropolitan Museum of Art in New York City.

== History ==
This piece is dated sometime between the years 480 and 460 BCE. This period of time saw many cultural and artistic changes for the Greek mainland. The creation of this statue would have coincided with the final events of the Persian Wars, a series of major conflicts of the Greek city states and the Persian empire. The Greeks emerged victorious after the Battle of Plataea, and with the victory a new unity emerged within Greece. For the first time in its history, Greece proved itself to be a force to be reckoned with in the ancient world. This attitude permeated all facets of Greek culture, including the arts. With each passing year, more and more archaic traits in the artwork were taken away until Classicism was fully embraced by the people.

== Diskos throwing ==
This event was a very popular sport in the Greek community. The goal was to throw a diskos as far as possible. The diskos, usually made out of metal, was rather heavy and required precise form to throw properly. Most were flat, although it was possible that some had a slight bulge at the center. The first landing of the diskos to the thrower would be the distance measured.

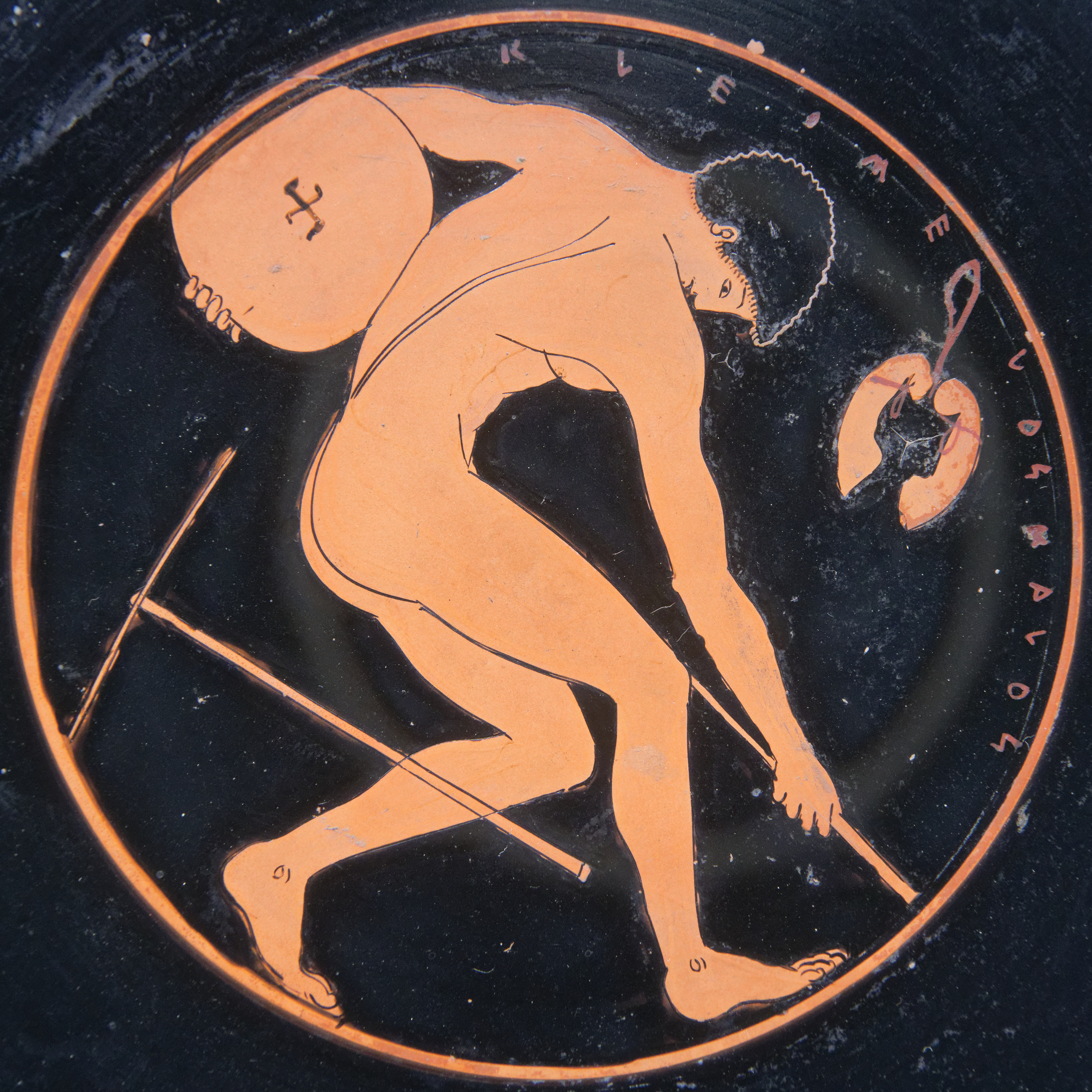
Discus thrower, tondo of a kylix by the Kleomelos Painter, Louvre Museum

A demanding activity, this sport required the athlete to be in peak ability to perform competitively. Based on the many depictions of the throw, it is also evident that the action needed a high degree of coordination. Technique varied depending on the athlete. However, unlike the more horizontal arc of modern-day diskos throwers, the arc of the throw from this era was far more vertical.

There are at least three known commonly used methods of throwing. The method that the unknown athlete in the statue uses begins with the diskos being held by the left hand. Before it is thrown, it is rested upon the shoulder. The right foot is firmly planted into the ground for stability and balance against the heavily bent left arm. From this point, the diskos is swung, and also rapidly handed off to the right hand before being released. The second method began with the arms in close proximity with the body. The diskos itself would be held with both hands, and the core engaged to keep the motion controlled. With the left leg in proper position, the thrower would then bring the arms up at a quick rate. If performed correctly, the hands would end up about level with the head. The third method bears a strong resemblance to another artwork, the Discobolus. Similar to the bronze diskos thrower, the right foot is forward and grounded. The left hand holds the diskos with the full length of the arm until it was swung up and passed off to the right arm, after which it was released.

== Style ==
Although the timeline of this piece suggests that it would be Classical, this statue is not entirely within a single style of Greek art. There are multiple facets of the piece that can be attributed to either the Classical style, archaic style, or transitional work that can not be fully categorized. The idealized, young athletic body is indicative of Classical style work. However, there are many features of the statue that exhibit features from other styles. The bowl-shaped ears are heavily reminiscent of archaic style work. Proportionally, they are incorrect due to their positioning. They are far too high in relation to the eyes. The eyes themselves feature very heavy eyelids. That, and their strong definition, suggest that they draw their influence from earlier periods of time. The chin also appears unnatural. In comparison to the rest of the face, it is unusually long.

The hair is not as simple to categorize. It almost appears as if it were meant to be a helmet, further accentuated with the lack of any incising, though it is possible that the original incising has faded away over time.

== Description ==
The statue depicts a young nude athlete ready to throw a diskos. The statue is almost intact save for the left foot and the entire right arm. Though the right arm is missing, images from vase paintings suggest that the right arm would be relaxed with an open hand. The arm would be slightly bent at the elbow. Still, enough remains that it is not impossible to decipher the action. Standing at only around 9 inches, the statue is rather small. The body is muscular, and there are clear details for the chest, shoulders, abdomen, and iliac furrow. The bronze has oxidized and dulled, though there are a few small sections of the piece that retain their original metallic luster. The expression suggests that this is not someone who is carrying out a simple task. Rather, it is meant to portray an athlete that has fully accustomed himself to the sport.

== See also ==
- Sport in ancient Greek art

== Bibliography ==
- Bates, William N. 1908. "New York. Acquisitions of the Metropolitan Museum." American Journal of Archaeology, 12(3): pp. 377–79, fig. 8.
- Robinson, Edward. 1908. "New Accessions in the Classical Department: II. The Diskos-Thrower." Bulletin of the Metropolitan Museum of Art, 3(2): pp. 31–6.
- Richter, Gisela M. A. 1915. Greek, Etruscan and Roman Bronzes. no. 78, pp. 48–51, New York: Gilliss Press.
- Richter, Gisela M. A. 1917. Handbook of the Classical Collection. pp. 89–90, figs. 52-53, New York: The Metropolitan Museum of Art.
- Hyde, Walter Woodburn. 1921. Olympic Victor Monuments and Greek Athletic Art. pp. 220 n. 5, 221, fig. 46, Washington, D.C.: Carnegie Institution of Washington.
