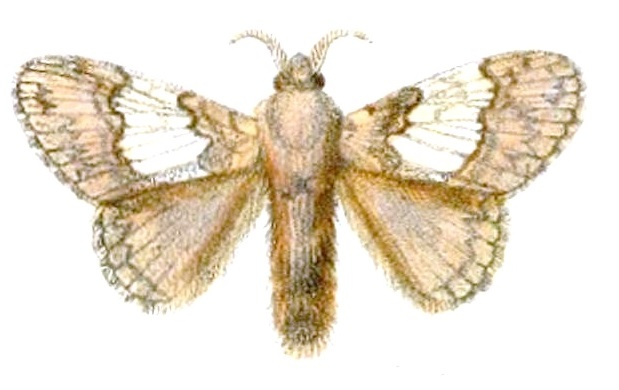

Scientific classification
- Domain: Eukaryota
- Kingdom: Animalia
- Phylum: Arthropoda
- Class: Insecta
- Order: Lepidoptera
- Family: Lasiocampidae
- Genus: Euglyphis
- Species: E. amida

Binomial name
- Euglyphis amida (H. Druce, 1890)

Synonyms
- Hydrias amida H. Druce, 1890

= Euglyphis amida =

Species of moth

Euglyphis amida is a species of moth of the family Lasiocampidae first described by Herbert Druce in 1890. It is found in Ecuador.
