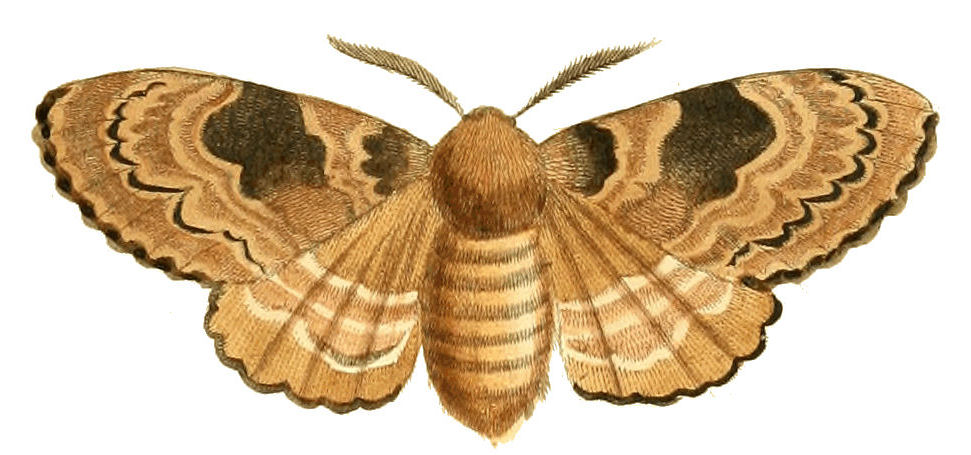

Scientific classification
- Domain: Eukaryota
- Kingdom: Animalia
- Phylum: Arthropoda
- Class: Insecta
- Order: Lepidoptera
- Family: Lasiocampidae
- Genus: Euglyphis
- Species: E. rivulosa

Binomial name
- Euglyphis rivulosa (Drury, 1773)

Synonyms
- Bombyx rivulosa Drury, 1773

= Euglyphis rivulosa =

Species of moth

Euglyphis rivulosa is a species of moth in the family Lasiocampidae. It was first described by Dru Drury in 1773 from Suriname.

== Description ==
Upperside: antennae pectinated. Head, thorax, abdomen, and wings pale reddish brown or fawn coloured. The latter with several indented and waved lines, some being darker and some lighter than the general colour of the wings. On the anterior is a large chocolate patch, situated on the middle of the wings, and joining to the anterior edge; between which and the shoulders is another that is much smaller.

Underside: tongue obsolete. Palpi, breast, abdomen, and wings brown, as on the upperside; the latter immaculate, except a dark patch on each wing near the shoulders. Margins of the wings slightly dentated.

Wingspan 3 inches (75 mm).
