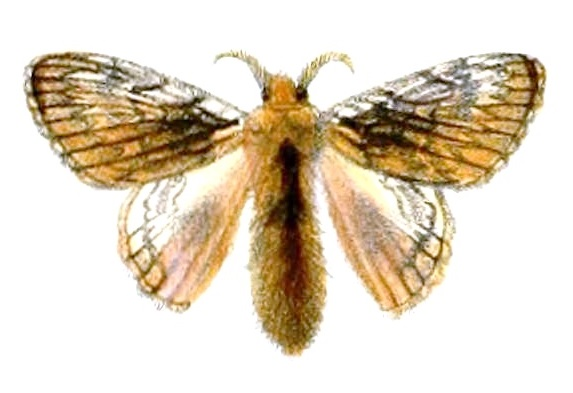

Scientific classification
- Domain: Eukaryota
- Kingdom: Animalia
- Phylum: Arthropoda
- Class: Insecta
- Order: Lepidoptera
- Family: Lasiocampidae
- Genus: Euglyphis
- Species: E. lascoria

Binomial name
- Euglyphis lascoria (H. Druce, 1890)

Synonyms
- Hydrias lascoria H. Druce, 1890; Euglyphis cariacica Draudt, 1927

= Euglyphis lascoria =

Species of moth

Euglyphis lascoria is a species of moth of the family Lasiocampidae first described by Herbert Druce in 1890. It is found in Ecuador and Brazil.
