= Sabouroff head =

Late Archaic Greek marble sculpture

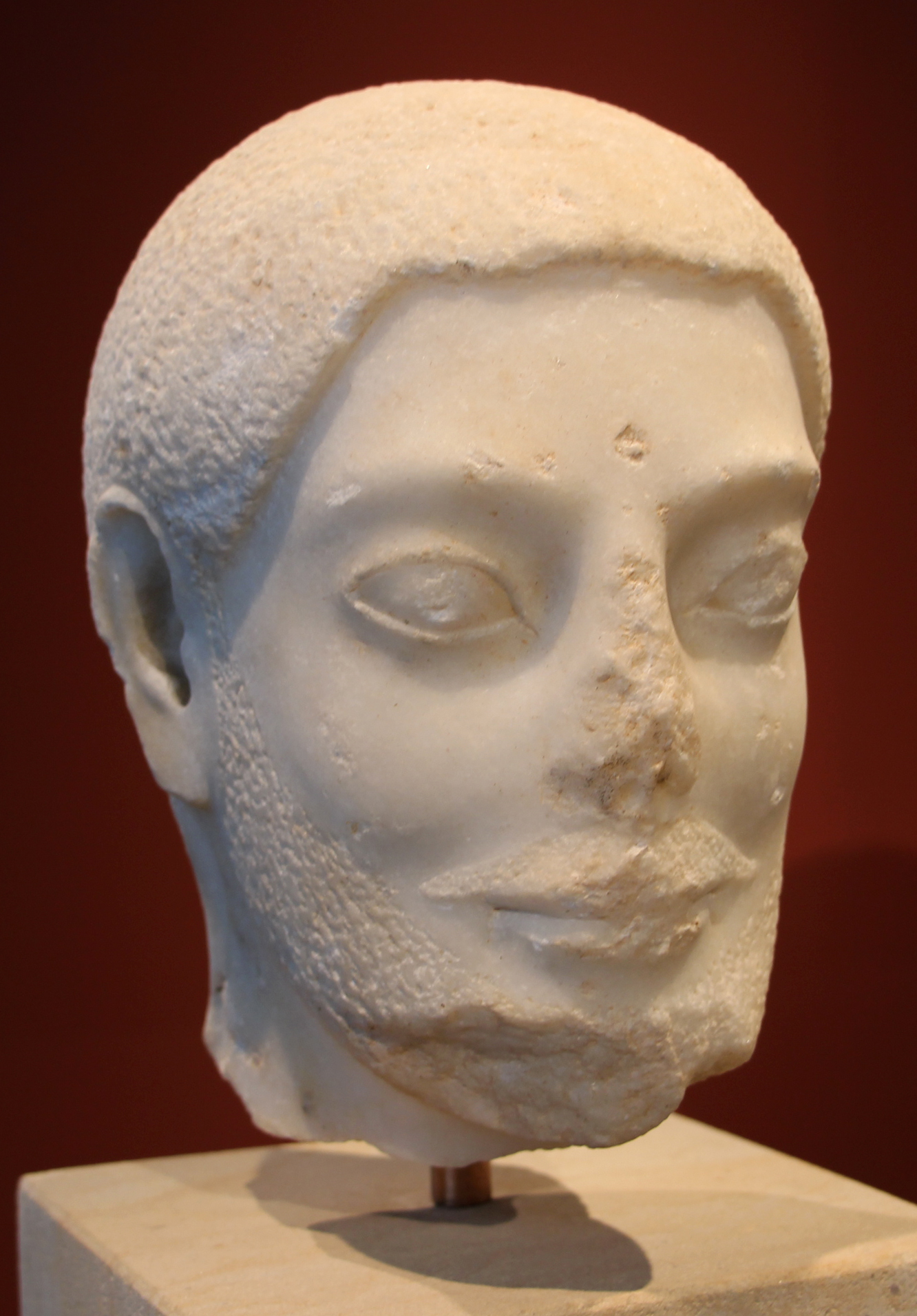
- Material: Marble
- Height: 23 cm
- Created: c. 550–525 BC
- Discovered: before 1885; Greece
- Discovered by: Giovanni Belzoni and Henry Beechey
- Present location: Berlin, Germany

The Sabouroff head is a Late Archaic Greek marble sculpture. It is dated to c. 550–525 BC. This head of a Kouros was named after Peter Alexandrovich Saburov, a collector of ancient Greek sculpture and antiquities. It is 23 centimeters in height. The sculpture is allegedly from Attica or Aegina, and there are also conjectures that it may be from Caria in Asia Minor. The head is currently located in the Antikensammlung Berlin.

This marble head may have belonged to a life-size statue. It has been the object of various debates regarding the unusual design of the hair and beard. Men usually had long hair in 6th century Greek statues, but the beard was a common attribute in archaic sculpture. The treatment of the moustache, separate from the beard on the cheeks and chin, is very rare for Greek sculpture and gives an exotic look to the head. The head has been described as "nearer to a portrait than any other work surviving from Archaic Greece" (other than the Boxer Relief in Athens).

Using an optical 3D-scanner the cast copy at the Heidelberg University was acquired and analyzed using the GigaMesh Software Framework. The geometric measurements using Voronoi cells and Geodesic distances at the high-resolution 3D-model show an unbalance and a slight tilting of the head indicating that it was part of an equestrian statue.
