= Kleophrades Painter Panathenaic prize amphora =

Kleophrades terracotta Panathenaic prize amphora
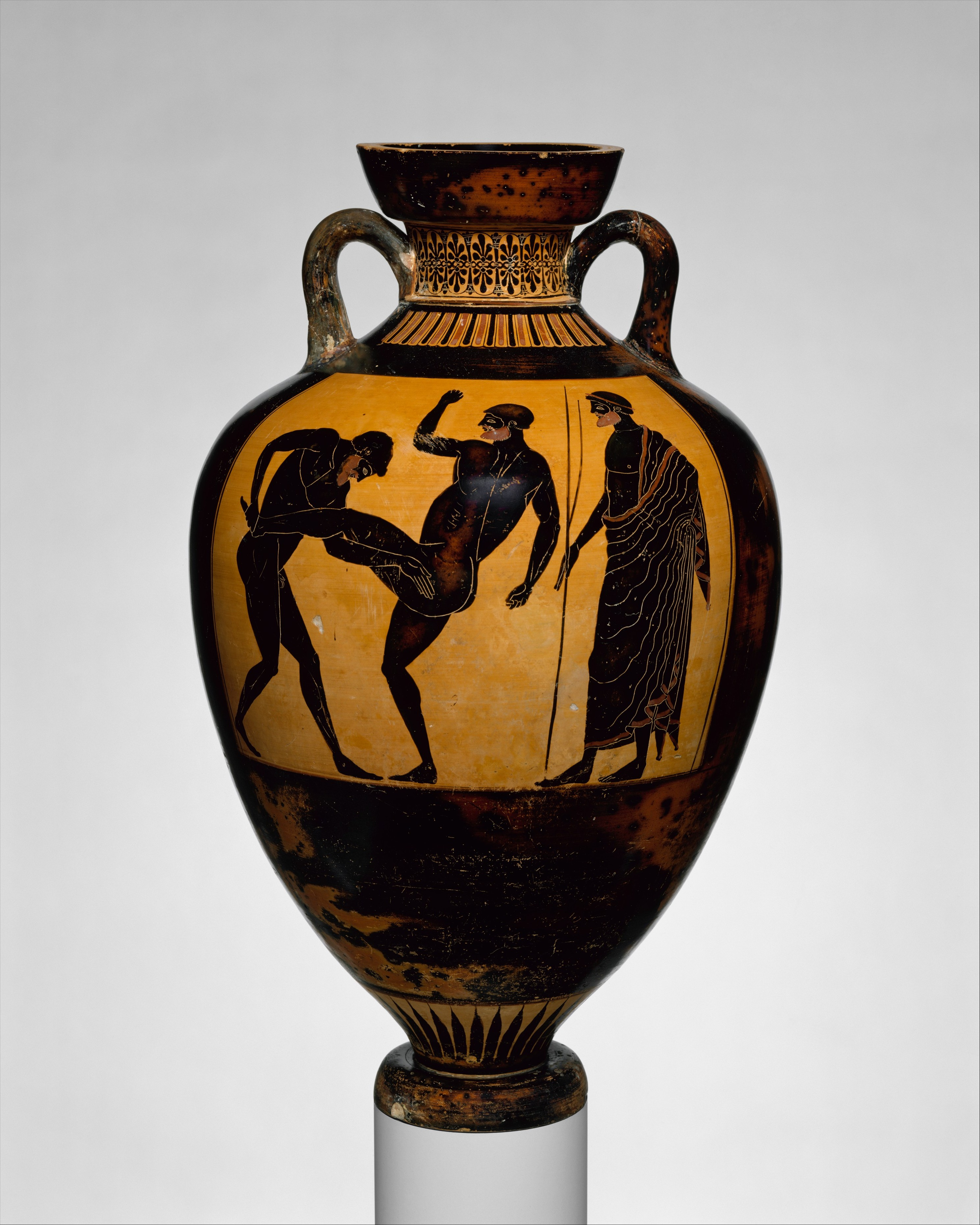
- The Kleophrades Panathenaic prize amphora
- Material: Terracotta
- Size: 63.5 centimetres (25.0 in) high

The Kleophrades Panathenaic prize amphora is an Archaic period amphora by the Kleophrades Painter from the collection of the Metropolitan Museum of Art. Dating to c. 500 BCE, the amphora, filled with olive oil, was the prize for a victor in the Panathenaia games in Athens. This particular amphora is a neck amphora that stands at 63.5 centimetres (25.0 in) tall.

== Artistic technique ==
All of the imagery on the Kleophrades terracotta Panathenaic prize amphora is in black-figure style, a painting technique popularized during the Archaic period. The background of the images acquires a red hue through the firing process of the clay; no paint or pigment is added to achieve this color. To achieve the black images seen on the faces, handles, neck, and base of the amphora, Kleophrades painted the pre-fired clay with a watered down clay solution. Red details, such as the boxers' muscles, hair, and eyes, could be added in by carving into the added clay with a fine tool.

Once the black figure details were added, Kleophrades fired the clay in the kiln in a multi-temperature process. First, the kiln would be heated to 800°C (1472°F) with a ventilating chamber kept open, thus allowing the clay to be fired in an oxygen-rich environment. This process causes the entire vase to glow red, including the added paint-like clay. Next, the kiln's vents would be closed and alternative tinder materials would be added to make the environment oxygen-poor and even hotter. Doing so allowed the added clay to turn black and glossy. Lastly, the potter would re-open the ventilation to re-oxygenate the kiln and allow the temperature to drop, thus causing the non-decorated regions to revert to their natural red color. While the majority of the black-figure painting on this amphora is the figurative depictions of Athena Promachos and the Pankration, the painter also added small, geometric decorative elements to the neck and base of the vessel.

== Imagery ==
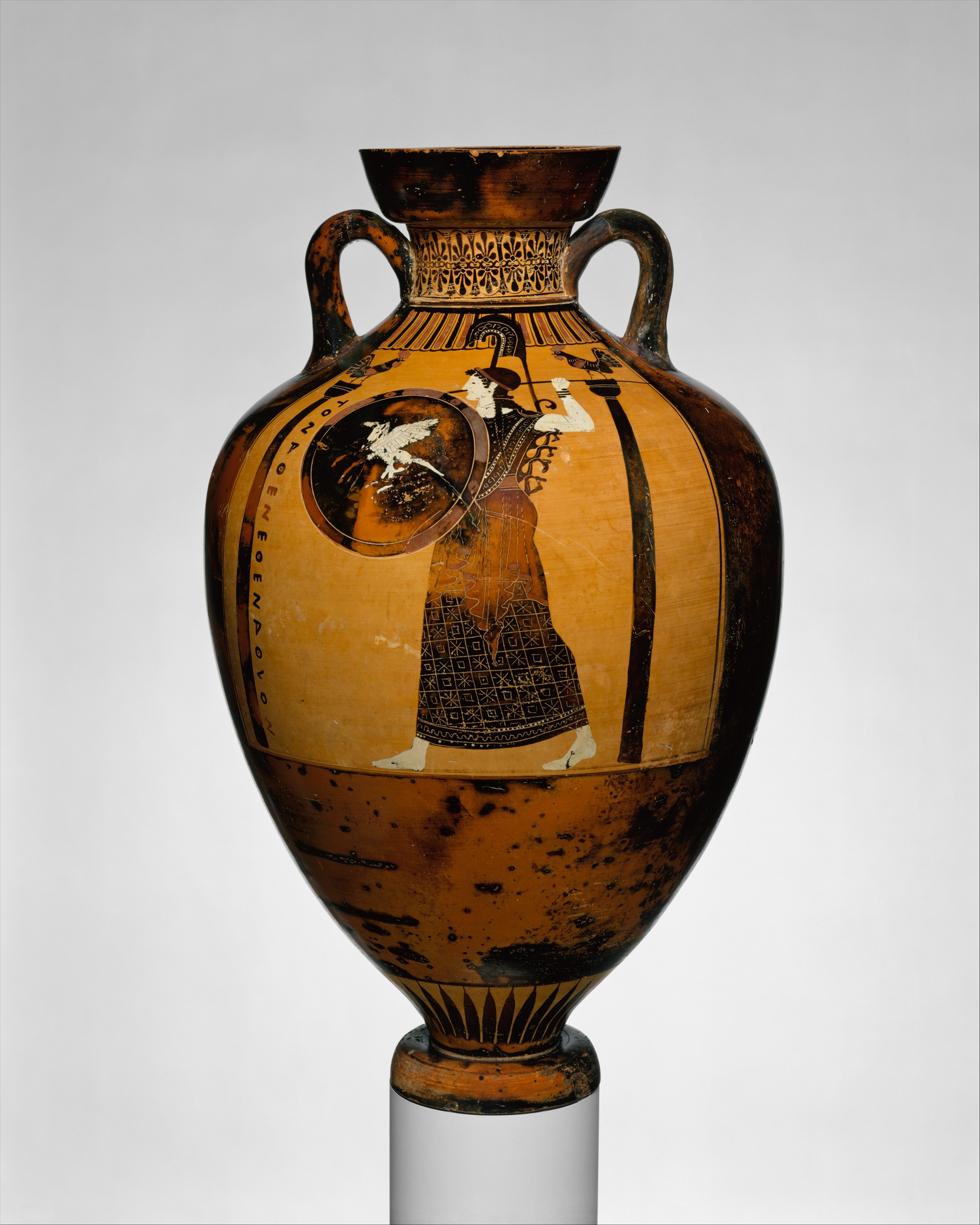
Portrait of Athena Promachos

Like all Panathenaic prize amphorae, this vase features a portrait of Athena Promachos on one of its faces. This particular iteration of Athena leads soldiers into battle and always holds a spear in one hand, protects her body with a shield in the other hand, and has a helmet on her head. On the left side of the Athena Promachos face is the inscription "ton Athenethen athlon," meaning "a prize from Athens;" like the image of Athena herself, this phrase appeared on all Panathenaic prize amphorae. The other face of the amphora portrays the Pankration, an event that incorporated elements of combat sports like kickboxing and wrestling. The Pankration face is particularly unique for its inclusion of both the athletes competing in the event and an onlooking judge; art historians suggest that the appearance of the judge emphasizes how dangerous the event was, as it lacked true rules and regulations. Both faces of the amphora have a single zone or register portraying the figurative scene. The majority of the remainder of the body is painted black, with red detailing around the neck and base.

== Canon of Kleophrades works ==
While Kleophrades created more red-figure works than black-figure, he did paint several Panathenaic prize amphorae, all of which were in black-figure. As such, the technique was not out of the ordinary for him, but rather not used as frequently as red-figure. Kleophrades was especially renowned for his ability to incorporate pathos in his figural design and illicit emotion from the viewers. The dynamic Pankration scene is no exception, as it showcases the dynamic and dangerous nature of the sport. Many of his works featured figures from throughout Greek mythology and sporting events. The inclusion of both Athena Promachos and the Panathenaic Pankration in this prize amphora combines his two most popular subjects into one cohesive work.
