= Apobates Base =

Ancient Greek statue base in the Acropolis Museum

The Apobates Base is a marble statue base featuring the scene of an Apobates competition or chariot race. The base, which is part of the collection at the Acropolis Museum in Athens, stands at 42 centimetres (17 in) in height and 86 centimetres (34 in) in width. A charioteer, armed athlete or warrior, and four horse-drawn chariot are depicted in profile relief. Named for the Greek “Apobatai” – literally the “Dismounters” – the base's relief depicts the racing event or Apobates race, which was a ceremonial part of the Panathenaic Games. In this event athletes would race against other athletes by dismounting and remounting moving chariots for prizes and renown.

== Sculptural style ==
The base dates to the Hellenistic period, ca. 300 B.C.E. While the base dates to the Hellenistic era, periodization is not an exact science. In this case, although made during the Hellenistic era, the artistry of the base actually falls into the categorization of Late Classical sculpture style. It is not entirely uncommon for styles to bleed over into other periods simply because specific artistic and stylistic changes are not the sole consideration for the division of periods like Classical and Hellenistic eras. Artistic styles, including that of the Apobates Base, can fall categorically into a style entirely different from the era to which they date.

This Base's Classical style is characterized by a great amount of dynamic movement, realistic and defined musculature, and greater sense of depth and dimension in sculptural figures. While a great deal of the base is damaged, the Classical style is most obvious in the dynamic pose of the athlete and figural depth of the horses.

== Depictions in art ==
This event became entrenched as part of the ritual of the Panathenaic Games. Among the various athletic competitions of the Panathenaic Festival, chariot racing came to prominence - though no research to date can provide a full picture of the event. However, the event is construed to be representative of past military spectacles and was integrated into a sporting event in which athletes would dismount and remount moving chariots during a race.

Contestants who won the Apobates race would commemorate their victory in the Panathenaia by constructing monuments and dedicatory statues. The Apobates base is one such dedication. The victors would place them in sanctuaries and Panhellenic sites. These victory monuments became artistic expressions in antiquity.

Depictions of charioteers and chariot racing became popular thematic elements to include in votive and victory dedications, as well as grave markers and sculptural decoration. The chariot became a symbol of wealth and, as a result, contributed to conspicuous consumption in society. The chariot became a prominent feature of Greek art and an important part of festivals like the Panathenaia. It was because of the connotations which chariots and charioteers held in Greek society that it became such a popular subject for Greek art.

== Discovery ==
Found on the west side of the Athenian Acropolis, the base supported an athletic or military victory dedication, similar to a votive dedication. Unfortunately only the base survives.

== Iconography ==
The chariot was introduced to the Greeks through trade and interaction with the Near East ca. 1400 B.C.E. However, the chariot became adopted and integrated into Greek iconography. The same motif is found in some of the earliest sculpture from mainland Greece, namely the sandstone Grave Stele at Mycenae found in Grave Circle A which dates to the 16th century B.C.E. In ancient Greek culture, the chariot and charioteer became a symbol of power and wealth because horses were very expensive and chariots themselves extremely impracticable for Greek terrain.
