= Boxer stele fragment from Kerameikos =

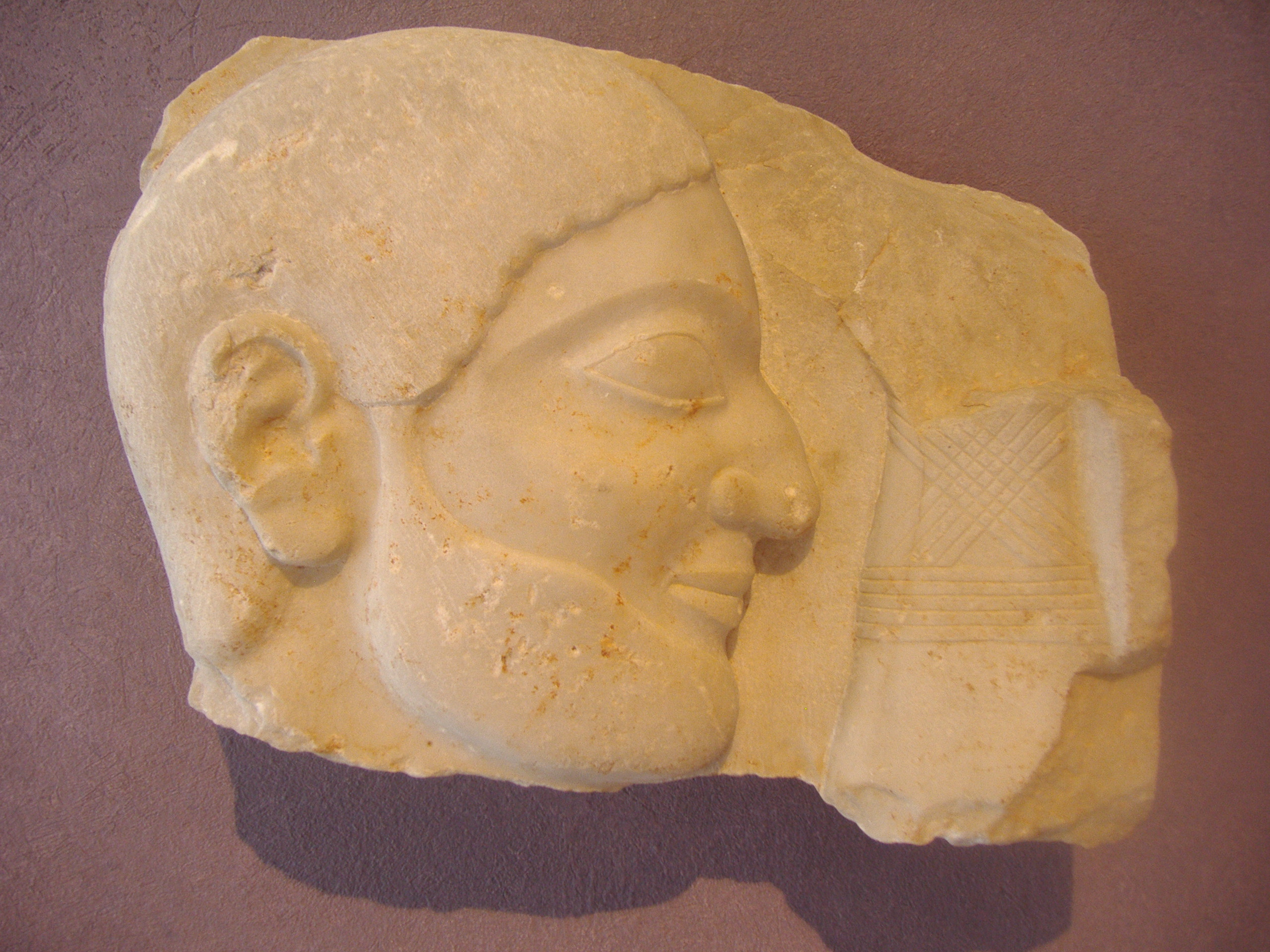
Boxer stele fragment, ca. 540 BC

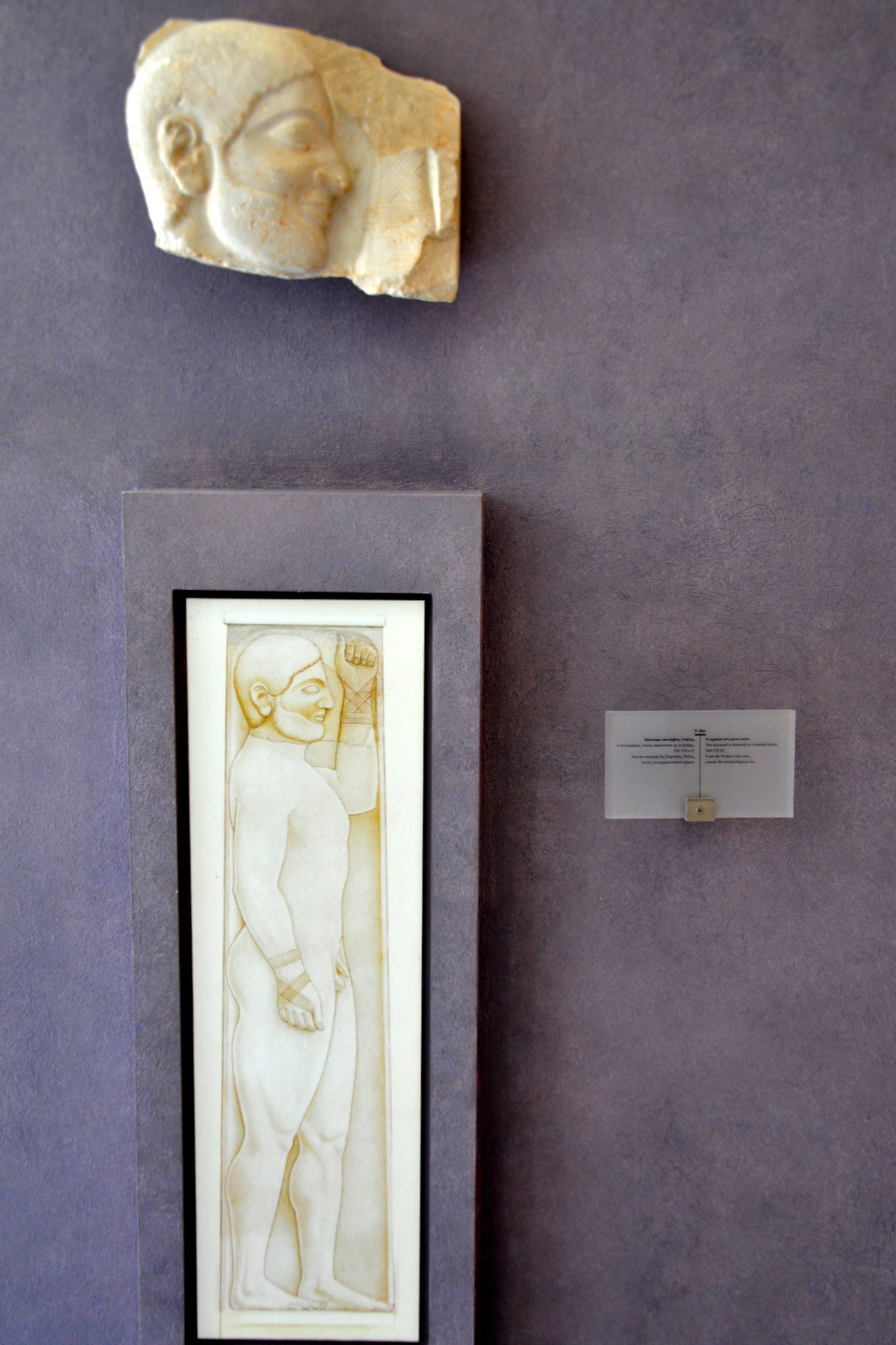
Boxer stele hanging in the Kerameikos Archaeological Museum

A marble fragment of a funerary stele discovered in 1953, dated c. 540 BC, depicts an ancient Greek boxer. The individual's depiction as a boxer is apparent in his broken nose, cauliflower ear, and the strapped wrist that he holds aloft – these straps were used by the Ancient Greeks to secure knuckle-guards for boxing competitions. It is considered one of the earliest examples of a highly individualized athlete depiction in Ancient Greek sculpture, and "nearer to a portrait than any other work surviving from Archaic Greece" (together with the Sabouroff head). It utilizes relief carving techniques to characterize a subject long before high degrees of individual characterization were apparent in freestanding sculpture.

== Discovery ==
The stele fragment was discovered in 1953 by Threpsiades, in the remains of Athens' Themistoklean Walls. It hangs today in the Kerameikos Archaeological Museum.

== Boxing in Ancient Greece ==
In ancient Greece, there were very few rules in boxing - it was a brutal sport. Gloves were not typical in the ancient Greek version of the sport; rather, fighters wore himantes, or leather thongs, around their wrists and the lower part of their hands to protect them from damage. In Plato's Gorgias, he refers to them as "folk with the battered ears," referencing their tendency to become disfigured by violence, like the cauliflower ears depicted in the stele In fact, it was not unusual for a fighter to become seriously injured or even killed in this ancient sport.

== Other Ancient Greek Depictions of Boxing ==
This stele fragment's subject can be compared to the notable Boxer at Rest, also known as the Terme Boxer. Unlike the boxer stele, which is in relief and of marble, this sculpture was made in the round and of bronze and copper inlay. This sculpture further depicts the detrimental physical effects of ancient Greek boxing - while the stele only has cauliflower ears, Boxer at Rest has cauliflower ears, a broken nose, and cuts and scrapes emphasized from the statue's bronze composition with inlay of copper. The extra detail and intricacy of Boxer at Rest contributes to its pathos, or emotional effect on the viewer.
