= Boeotian Dancer's Group Kothon, Black Figure Tripod, 6th Century B.C. =

Ancient Greek pottery piece

An ancient Greek pottery kothon black figure tripod now in the Dallas Museum of Art is from Boetia and dates back to the sixth century BC. It portrays three different figural scenes: one with athletes, one with ritual dancers (Komasts), and one with a drinking activity, on each of its legs. It is one of a group of vessels known as the Boeotian Dancers Group, from their painted decoration.

== Purpose ==
This particular vessel is a combination of both the kothon and tripod pottery shapes. A tripod refers to a three-legged stand used to support some sort of bowl or container, preventing it from falling over. In the case of this pot, the tripod is used to support a kothon (a type of Greek pot generally used for domestic purposes). This kothon held some kind of perfume, as indicated by its small size. As a vessel for perfume storage, the kothon was situated on top of a tripod because it made the substance inside more difficult to spill, protecting the valuable luxury good inside of it.

=== Perfume and Greek athletics ===
In antiquity, perfume functioned both as a sign of elitism and as a means of maintaining good hygiene. While it was used by both genders, males most publicly applied perfume, often in relation to athletic activities. Post exercise, they would coat themselves in perfume to mask the smell of their sweat at public bathing houses in an effort to be more hygienic. The idea of perfume being correlated to good hygiene was propagated by Hippocrates, an ancient Greek physician known by many as the founder of medical science, who claimed that perfume could be used to prevent disease.

== Figural decoration ==
This kothon black-figure tripod is decorated with several figural designs, as was typical of pottery during the Archaic Period. The primary figural designs are found on the tripod's legs and illustrate males in the nude participating in various Greek activities. These figural decorations are indicative of Greek lives of luxury, as it was the wealthy who participated in elaborate drinking parties (symposiums) and watched athletic duels like those depicted on the vase.

=== Athletes ===
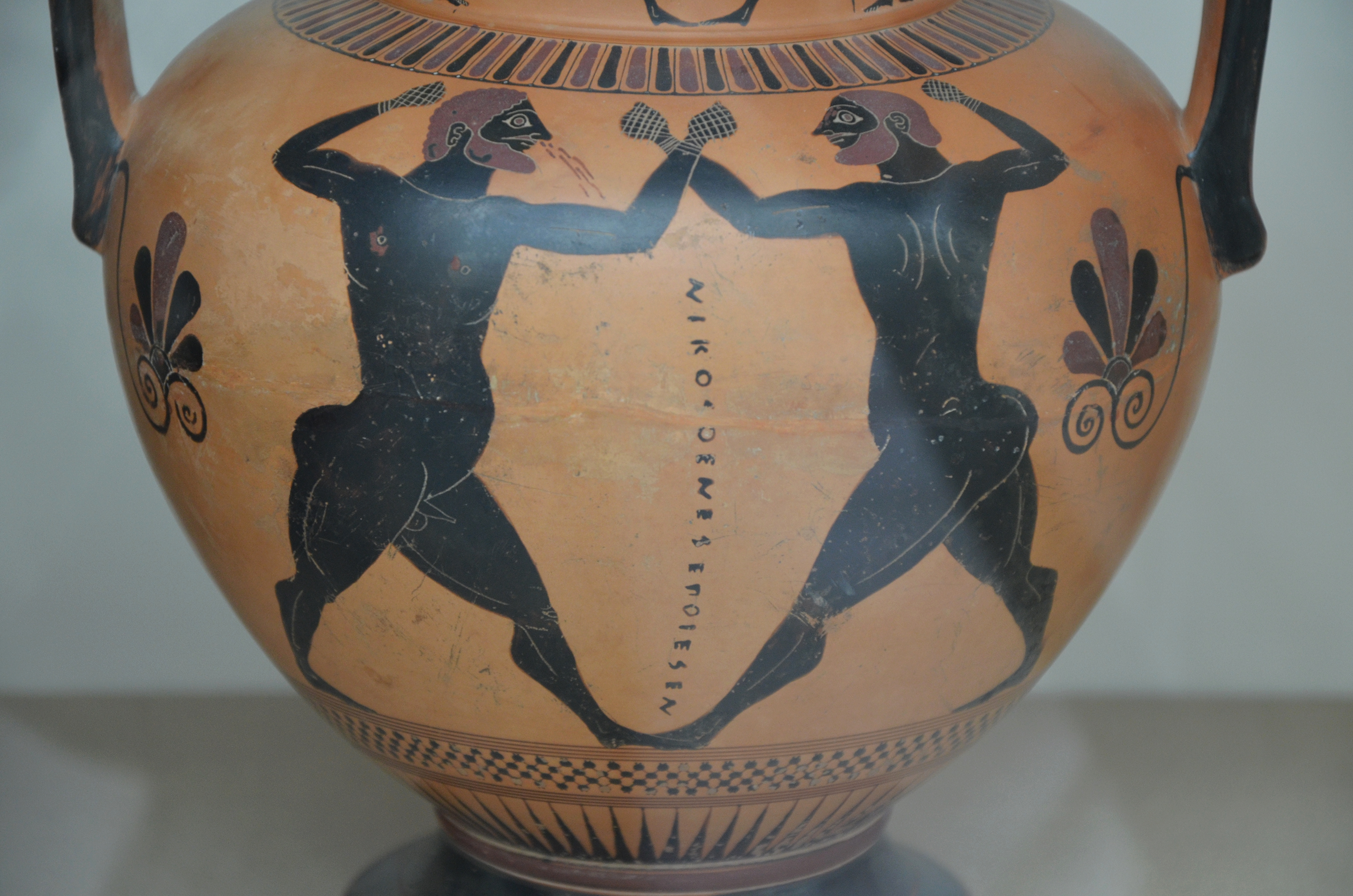
This black-figure amphora, painted by the potter Nikosthenes, displays a Grecian boxing scene similar to the one depicted on the Boeotian Dancers Group's Kothon, Black Figure Tripod.

Decorating the third leg of the tripod are two men facing each other with their arms raised in a fighting position, suggesting they are engaged in the athletic sport of boxing. The artist who painted this vessel uses facial hair to show a difference in age between the two athletes. The athlete on the left side has a beard and longer hair, suggesting he is older, while the athlete on the right has no facial hair whatsoever and is slightly thinner, suggesting he is younger. Behind them sits a tripod, likely the prize for the winner of their duel. This tripod can be interpreted as a reference to the type of pottery in which it is painted on, however because it is not as wide and bulky it is most likely supposed to be made of bronze and thus not exactly the same as the Boeotian Dancer Group Kothon, Black Figure Tripod. The depiction of two athletes interacting in a combative sport that focuses on individual performance is representative of Greek culture during the Archaic period, which emphasized one's personal bravery and courage in taking on an opponent.

==== Boxing in Ancient Greece ====
Boxing was one of the most popular and dangerous combat sports in ancient Greece. Opponents were chosen at random without consideration for differences in weight and/or age. Similar to modern-day boxing gloves, boxers would wrap their hands in himantes (leather thongs) around their hands and wrists for protection during boxing matches.

=== Komasts ===
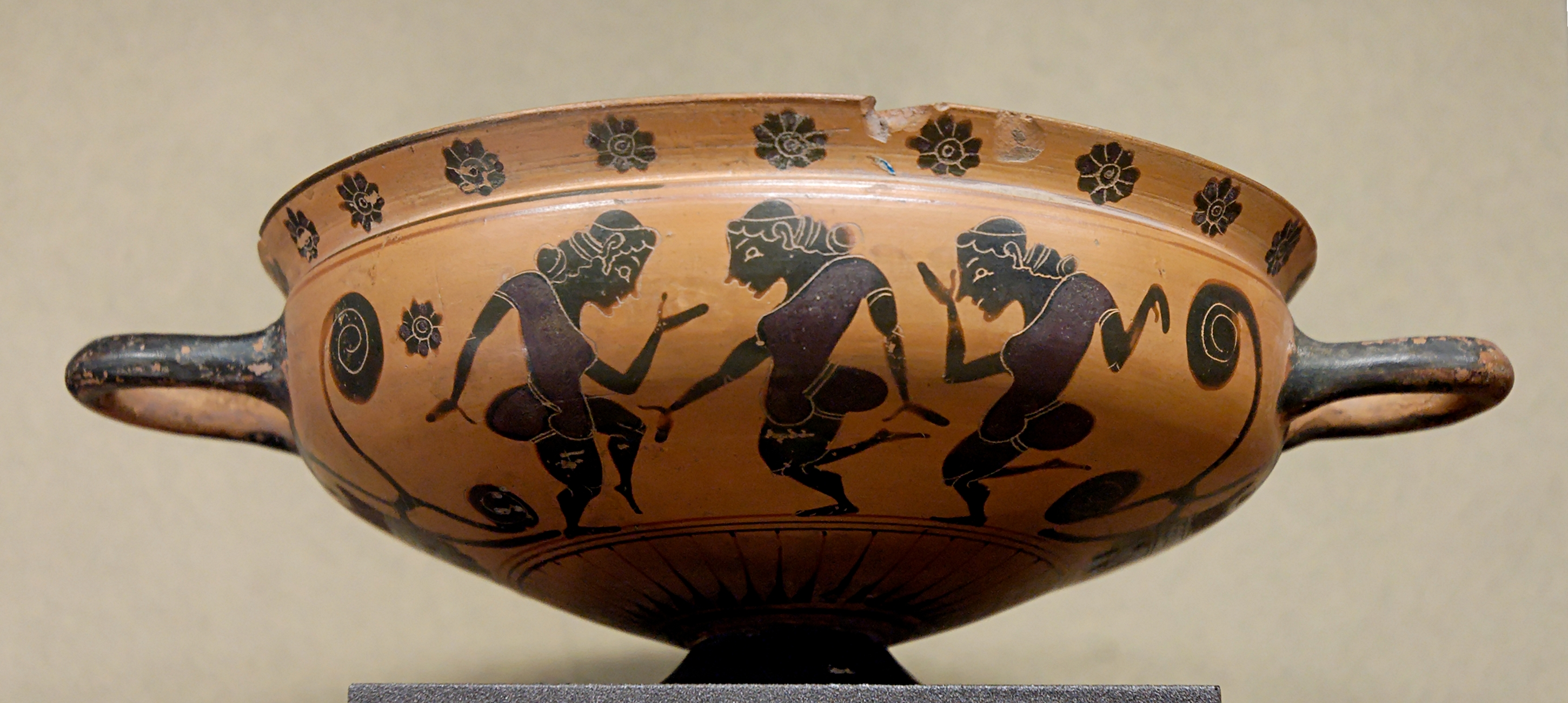
Different from the Kothon, Black Figure Tripod discussed in this article, this Komast cup from the Louvre is an example of how Komasts were depicted on ancient Greek pottery.

The second leg of the tripod features two male dancers, or Komasts (drunken, ritualistic dancers who were frequently depicted on Greek pottery), engaged in an intimate dance with each other. Komasts were commonly featured at symposiums, or formalized drinking parties, as entertainment is closely related to revelry in Ancient Greek culture and celebration of athletic achievement. The black-figure artist who painted this particular pot has added a line going across each dancer's arm, perhaps indicative of a sleeve/garment common of komast dancers of the time. One of the dancers' arms is intimately extended towards his counterpart's chin in a gesture with some sexual implications. This depiction of homosexuality among komasts is not uncommon in Greek pottery.

=== Drinking scene ===
On the first leg of the tripod two nude men are illustrated drinking wine. While one man hold the wine pitcher directly to his lips, greedily drinking all that is left inside, the other extends his cup, hoping that his friend will share. However, the frown he wears suggests that he believes that there will be no wine left for him to drink.

This drinking scene is representative of a symposium, a formalized drinking party commonly depicted in Ancient Greek art and indicative of elitism in Ancient Grecian society. This figural representation of the aristocratic drinking party further highlights the vessel's intended use as a sign of status.

== Boeotian Dancers Group ==
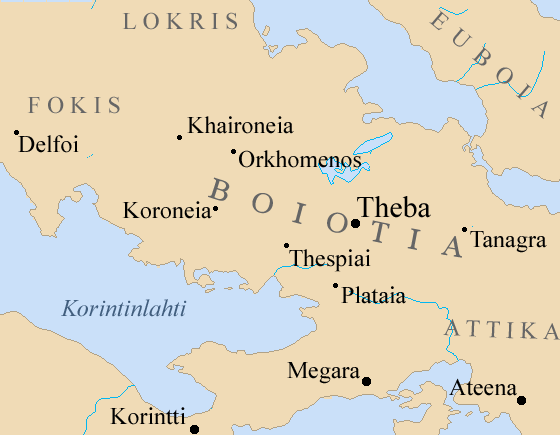
The region of Boetia, also referred to as Boiotia, where this Kiothon, Black Figure Tripod and other vessels in the Boeotian Dancers Group originate.

This Kothon, Black Figure Tripod is thought to be a part of the Boeotian Dancer's Group due to its shape, size, and figural decoration is similar to those in the group. These vessels were often tripod cauldrons featuring figural designs of Komasts. Often Komasts are the only figural decoration featured on pottery by the Boeotian Dancer's Group, however when other figural decoration is present, it often depicting situations of high activity. Because there are several different painters within the Boeotian Dancer's Group, across pots the Komasts are in similar poses and styles, but not identical.
