= Amasis (potter) =

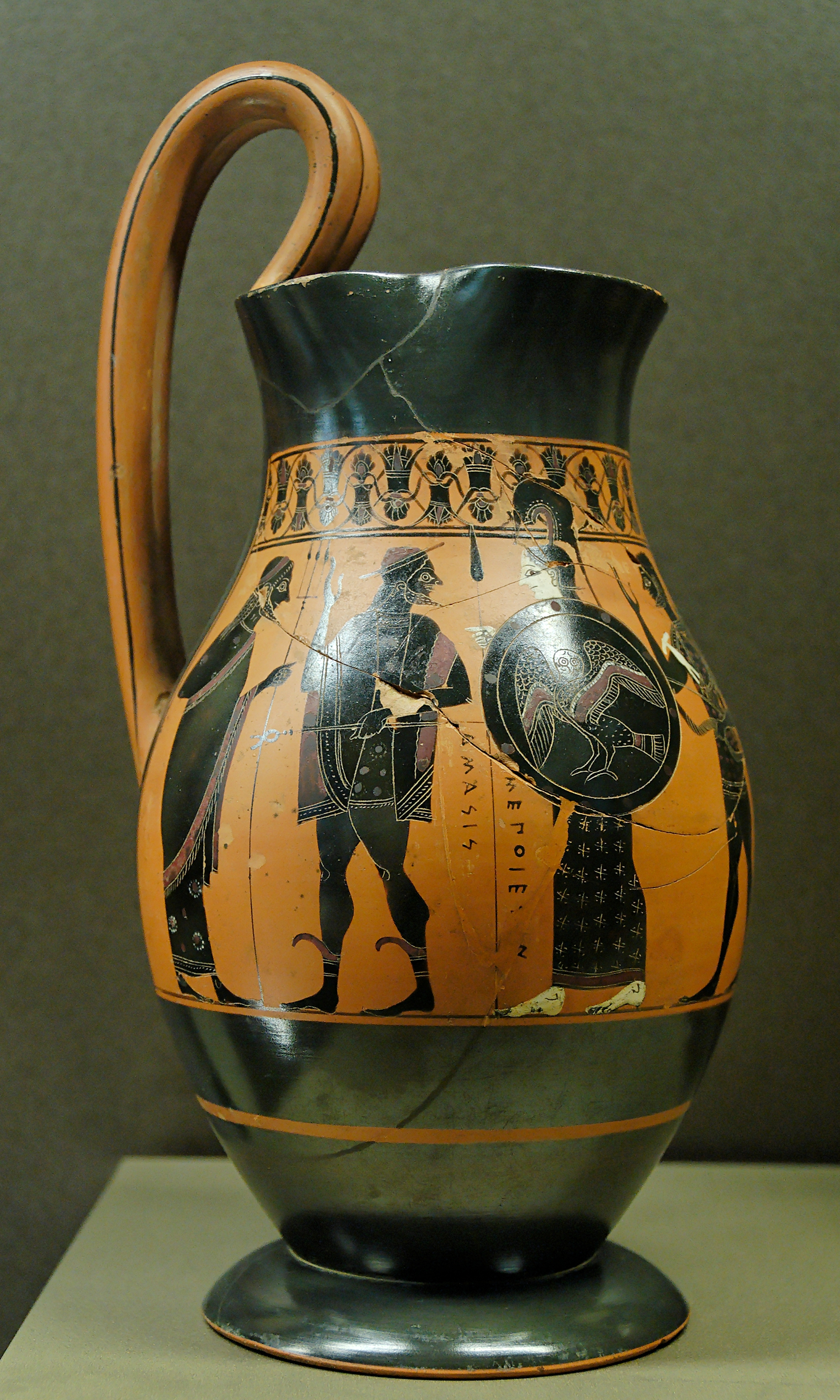
Olpe by the Amasis Painter; Paris, Louvre F 30

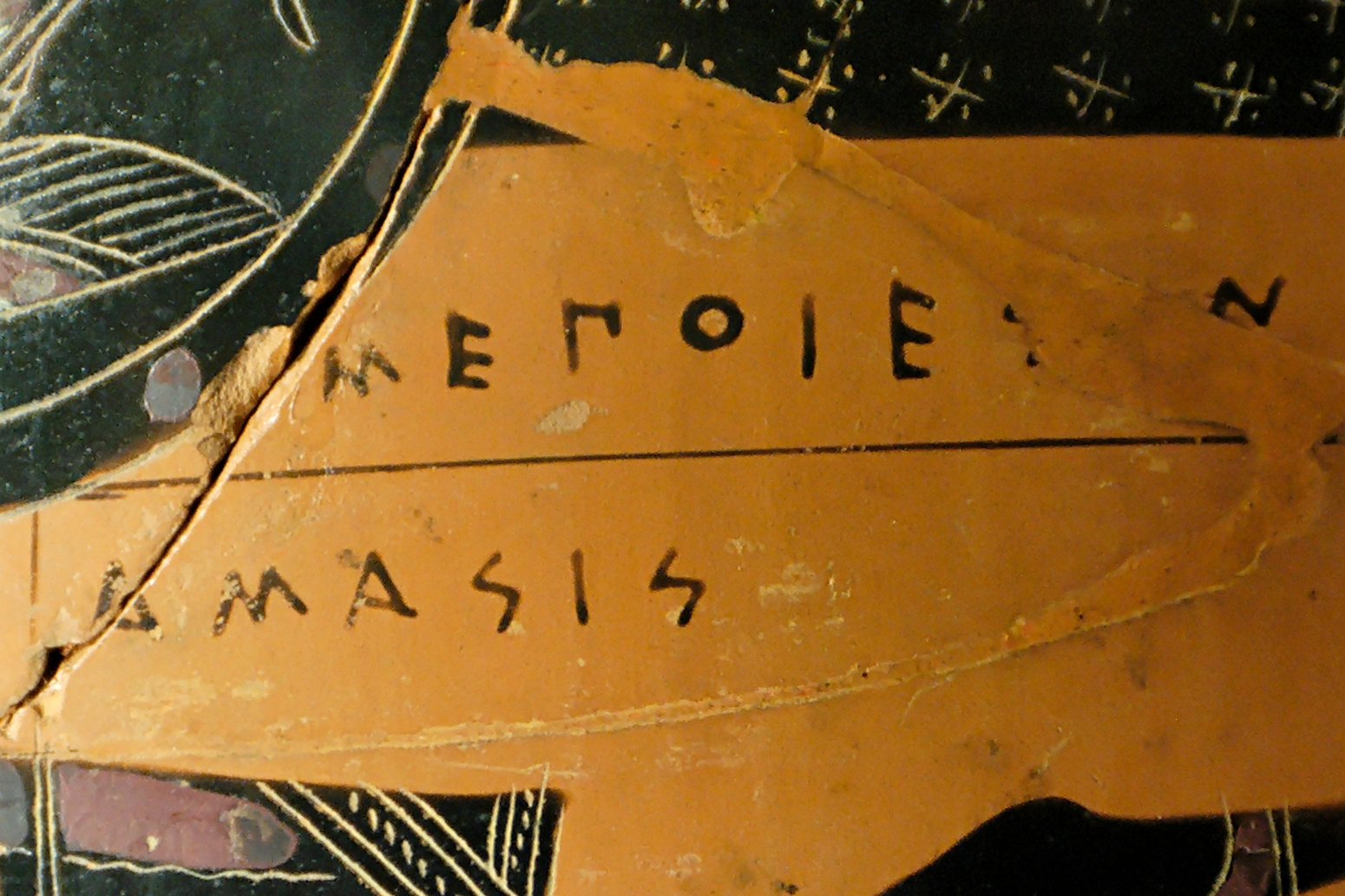
Signature by Amasis on an olpe, 550-540 BC; Paris, Louvre F 30

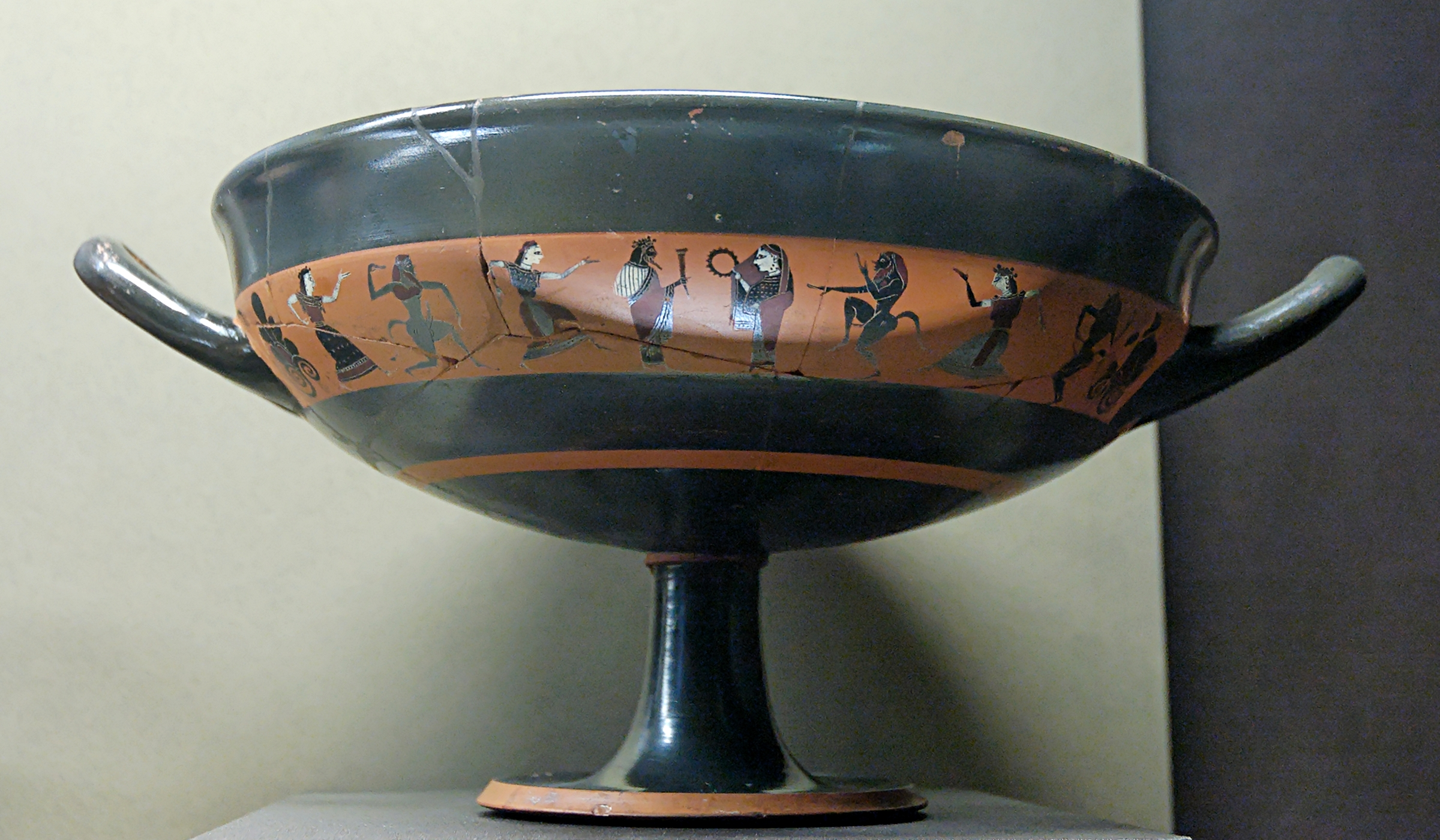
Band cup potted by Amasis and painted by the Amasis Painter, 550-540 BC, LouvreF 75

Amasis was an ancient Attic potter, active in Athens between 560/550 and 530/520 BC. Amasis’s pottery workshop also employed a well-known painter, who is conventionally named the Amasis Painter after the potter, and generally considered one of the best Archaic vase painters. His works are mostly black-figure, but some red-figure vase paintings by him do occur. He and Exekias produced the first major painted amphorae with a narrative image on front and back, respectively. Famous works:

- Amphora: Satyrs harvesting grapes (Würzburg, Martin von Wagner Museum)
- Amphora: Dionysos with a kantharos and youths with slain hares and foxes (Munich, Staatliche Antikensammlungen)

== Bibliography ==
- John D. Beazley: Attic Black-Figure Vase-Painters, Oxford 1956
- Dietrich von Bothmer: The Amasis Painter and his world. Vase-painting in 6th century B.C. Athens. Malibu, Calif., J. Paul Getty Museum 1985. ISBN 0-500-23443-4, ISBN 0-89236-086-0
- Papers on the Amasis painter and his world. Colloquium sponsored by the Getty Center for the History of Art and the Humanities and symposium sponsored by the J. Paul Getty Museum. Malibu, Calif., J. Paul Getty Museum 1987. ISBN 0-89236-093-3
- Hans Peter Isler: Der Töpfer Amasis und der Amasis-Maler. Bemerkungen zur Chronologie und zur Person, in: Jahrbuch des Deutschen Archäologischen Instituts 109 (1994) p. 93-114.
- Heide Mommsen: Aμασις μεπoιεσεν. Beobachtungen zum Töpfer Amasis, In: Athenian potters and painters. The conference proceedings (Oxford 1997) p. 17-34.
