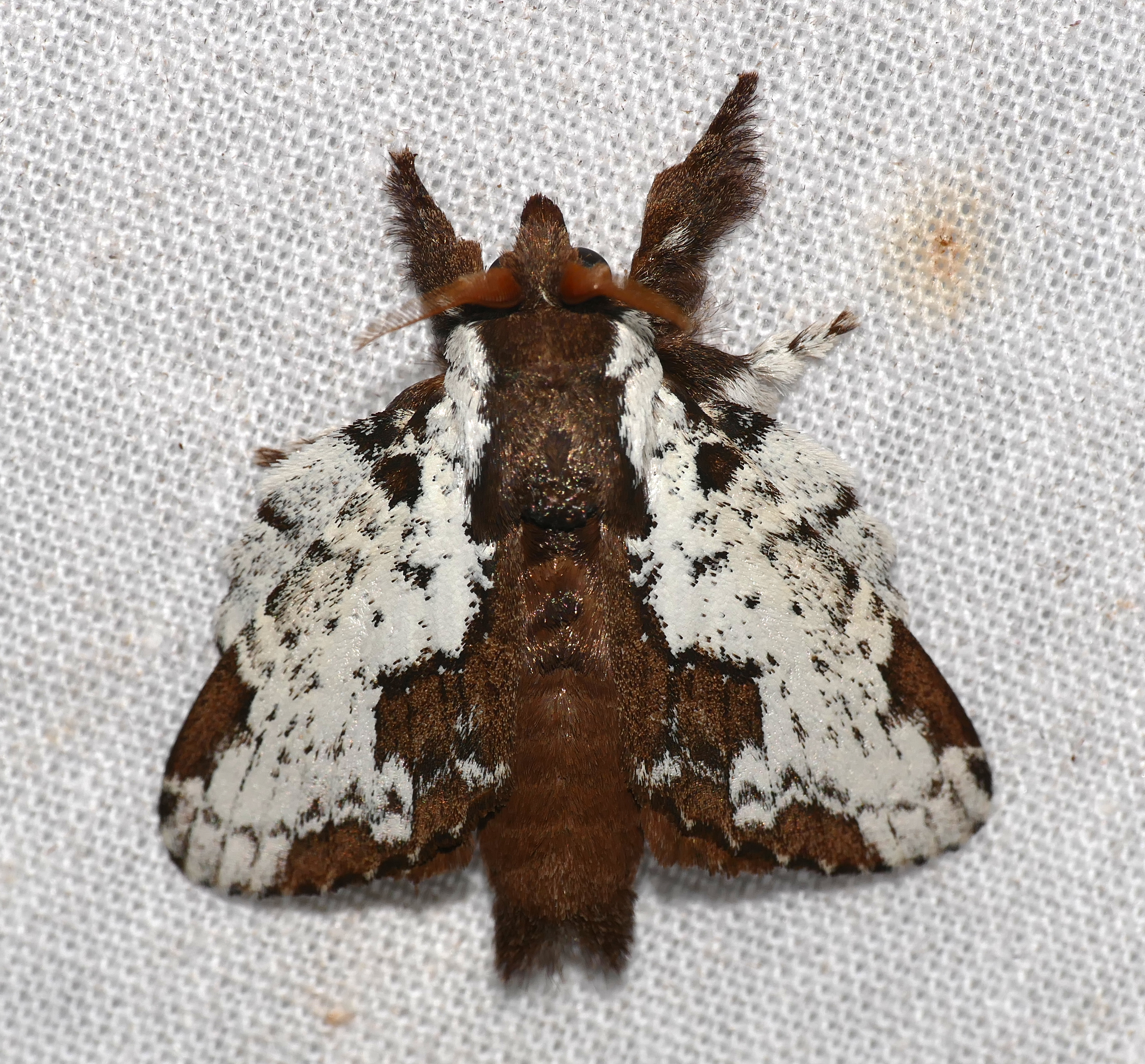
- Euglyphis braganza

Scientific classification
- Kingdom: Animalia
- Phylum: Arthropoda
- Clade: Pancrustacea
- Class: Insecta
- Order: Lepidoptera
- Family: Lasiocampidae
- Subfamily: Poecilocampinae
- Tribe: Macromphaliini
- Genus: Euglyphis; Hübner, [1820]

Synonyms
- Aselgia Hübner, [1820]; Claphe Walker, 1855; Hydrias Herrich-Schäffer, [1854]; Tacillia Walker, 1855

= Euglyphis =

Genus of moths

Euglyphis is a genus of moths in the family Lasiocampidae. The genus was erected by Jacob Hübner in 1820.

== Species ==
The following species are recognised in the genus Euglyphis:

- Claphe sp. Kaye
- Euglyphis abolla Draudt, 1927
- Euglyphis adusta (Walker, 1855)
- Euglyphis adustata (Bryk, 1953)
- Euglyphis aenegia Schaus, 1936
- Euglyphis agdara Schaus, 1936
- Euglyphis agresta (Stoll, 1782)
- Euglyphis albata (Dognin, 1923)
- Euglyphis albidifascia (Walker, 1855)
- Euglyphis albidula (Dognin, 1916)
- Euglyphis albigrisea (Dognin, 1916)
- Euglyphis albigrisea (Schaus, 1905)
- Euglyphis albiochrea Kaye, 1922
- Euglyphis albiserrata Draudt, 1927
- Euglyphis albofusca (Dognin, 1912)
- Euglyphis aldegondes Schaus, 1924
- Euglyphis aleria (Druce, 1890)
- Euglyphis alumnata (Dognin, 1912)
- Euglyphis amathuria (Druce, 1890)
- Euglyphis amatura Schaus, 1936
- Euglyphis amazonica (Butler, 1878)
- Euglyphis amida (Druce, 1890)
- Euglyphis amisena (Druce, 1890)
- Euglyphis argyphea (Berg, 1883)
- Euglyphis armata Durand, 2021
- Euglyphis artata Draudt, 1928
- Euglyphis asapha Schaus, 1936
- Euglyphis audifax Schaus, 1924
- Euglyphis banghaasi Draudt, 1927
- Euglyphis barbuti Durand, 2021
- Euglyphis barda (Schaus, 1910)
- Euglyphis bardina (Dognin, 1923)
- Euglyphis bibiana (Stoll, 1782)
- Euglyphis binuba (Dognin, 1923)
- Euglyphis bipuncta (Schaus, 1905)
- Euglyphis bochica Schaus, 1892
- Euglyphis boresa Schaus, 1896
- Euglyphis braganza (Dognin, 1912)
- Euglyphis braganza (Schaus, 1892)
- Euglyphis braganzina Schaus, 1934
- Euglyphis braganzoides (Schaus, 1912)
- Euglyphis bridarolliana Köhler, 1949
- Euglyphis brumosa (Dognin, 1923)
- Euglyphis brunnea (Schaus, 1894)
- Euglyphis bryki Heppner, 1996
- Euglyphis cachaca Schaus, 1936
- Euglyphis cacopasa (Dyar, 1910)
- Euglyphis campinata Schaus, 1936
- Euglyphis canescens Dognin, 1905
- Euglyphis canifascia (Walker, 1869)
- Euglyphis canities (Schaus, 1910)
- Euglyphis cantella Schaus, 1936
- Euglyphis capillata (Schaus, 1910)
- Euglyphis captiosa Draudt, 1927
- Euglyphis cardonai Durand, 2021
- Euglyphis cariosa (Schaus, 1910)
- Euglyphis carola (Schaus, 1910)
- Euglyphis casia (Dognin, 1922)
- Euglyphis casimir Schaus, 1924
- Euglyphis cassida (Dognin, 1922)
- Euglyphis castalia (Druce, 1897)
- Euglyphis castrensis Schaus, 1894
- Euglyphis catenifera Draudt, 1927
- Euglyphis celebris (Schaus, 1910)
- Euglyphis centuncula Draudt, 1927
- Euglyphis cercina (Druce, 1897)
- Euglyphis certima (Druce, 1897)
- Euglyphis chamicuros Schaus, 1896
- Euglyphis charax (Druce, 1897)
- Euglyphis chera (Schaus, 1896)
- Euglyphis cinerea (Dognin, 1901)
- Euglyphis cinerulenta (Dognin, 1916)
- Euglyphis ciniala Draudt, 1927
- Euglyphis cinifax Draudt, 1927
- Euglyphis circumducta (Dognin, 1923)
- Euglyphis claudia (Stoll, 1782)
- Euglyphis cochabamba Schaus, 1934
- Euglyphis coda Schaus, 1936
- Euglyphis combusta Draudt, 1927
- Euglyphis confusa (Walker, 1855)
- Euglyphis congruens Dognin, 1905
- Euglyphis consolabilis (Dyar, 1910)
- Euglyphis contubernalis Draudt, 1927
- Euglyphis corcyra (Druce, 1897)
- Euglyphis crepuscularis Draudt, 1927
- Euglyphis daltha (Schaus, 1905)
- Euglyphis debilis Draudt, 1927
- Euglyphis deceana (Druce, 1894)
- Euglyphis definita (Schaus, 1910)
- Euglyphis deformis (Schaus, 1890)
- Euglyphis delineata (Walker, 1855)
- Euglyphis dentilinea Draudt, 1928
- Euglyphis detrita Draudt, 1927
- Euglyphis deusta (Herrich-Schäffer)
- Euglyphis dicax Draudt, 1927
- Euglyphis directa (Schaus, 1910)
- Euglyphis directilinea (Schaus, 1905)
- Euglyphis discorica (Dyar, 1914)
- Euglyphis distincta (Butler, 1878)
- Euglyphis durtea (Schaus, 1905)
- Euglyphis efferata Draudt, 1927
- Euglyphis egra (Schaus, 1910)
- Euglyphis elena (Schaus, 1910)
- Euglyphis elongata (Dognin, 1912)
- Euglyphis erebina (Butler, 1878)
- Euglyphis exigua (Butler, 1878)
- Euglyphis exoterica Draudt, 1927
- Euglyphis faeculenta Draudt, 1927
- Euglyphis fallacia (Dognin, 1923)
- Euglyphis falsaria (Dognin, 1923)
- Euglyphis farina (Schaus, 1905)
- Euglyphis farinula (Dognin, 1912)
- Euglyphis fasciolata (Butler, 1878)
- Euglyphis fenestrata (Dognin, 1923)
- Euglyphis fibra (Schaus, 1890)
- Euglyphis filispinosa Draudt, 1927
- Euglyphis flatura (Dognin, 1916)
- Euglyphis flaviana Schaus, 1936
- Euglyphis flumentana (Dognin, 1912)
- Euglyphis fulvago Draudt, 1927
- Euglyphis funerea Schaus, 1896
- Euglyphis fusconigra (Dognin, 1912)
- Euglyphis geminata (Dognin, 1923)
- Euglyphis genesa (Schaus, 1905)
- Euglyphis gera (Schaus, 1905)
- Euglyphis gibea (Druce, 1899)
- Euglyphis giulia (Schaus, 1905)
- Euglyphis godeberti Schaus, 1936
- Euglyphis grammophora (C.Felder & R.Felder, 1874)
- Euglyphis gundlea Schaus, 1924
- Euglyphis gurda (Dognin, 1905)
- Euglyphis guttivena (Walker, 1855)
- Euglyphis guttularis (Walker, 1855)
- Euglyphis gutturalis
- Euglyphis herberti (Schaus, 1905)
- Euglyphis herbini Durand, 2021
- Euglyphis horrifer (Schaus, 1905)
- Euglyphis huacamaya Schaus, 1936
- Euglyphis hyalescens Schaus, 1936
- Euglyphis incivilis (Walker, 1865)
- Euglyphis inconspicua (Schaus, 1905)
- Euglyphis incopiosa (Dognin, 1922)
- Euglyphis indentata (Schaus, 1910)
- Euglyphis indrosia Schaus, 1936
- Euglyphis insuta Draudt, 1927
- Euglyphis intermedia Bryk, 1953
- Euglyphis interula (Dognin, 1916)
- Euglyphis intuta (Dognin, 1916)
- Euglyphis iresca (Schaus, 1905)
- Euglyphis isolina Schaus, 1936
- Euglyphis jessiehillae Montero-Ramirez, Janzen & Hallwachs, 2011
- Euglyphis juliana (Schaus, 1912)
- Euglyphis kotzschi Draudt, 1927
- Euglyphis lacrimosa Schaus, 1892
- Euglyphis lanceolata (Dognin, 1912)
- Euglyphis lanea Schaus, 1910
- Euglyphis lankesteri (Schaus, 1910)
- Euglyphis lapana Schaus, 1905
- Euglyphis laronia (Druce, 1887)
- Euglyphis larunda (Druce, 1887)
- Euglyphis larundina (Schaus, 1910)
- Euglyphis lascoria (Druce, 1890)
- Euglyphis lascorina Schaus, 1936
- Euglyphis laudia (Druce, 1890)
- Euglyphis laurena (Schaus, 1905)
- Euglyphis laverna (Schaus, 1910)
- Euglyphis lepta (Schaus, 1910)
- Euglyphis libella (Dognin, 1923)
- Euglyphis libnites (Druce, 1897)
- Euglyphis lillia Schaus, 1936
- Euglyphis limba (Druce, 1887)
- Euglyphis lixa (Dognin, 1912)
- Euglyphis lola (Schaus, 1905)
- Euglyphis lucedia Schaus, 1936
- Euglyphis luciana Schaus, 1936
- Euglyphis lucilla (Stoll, 1782)
- Euglyphis lyso (Druce, 1897)
- Euglyphis maasseni Heppner, 1996
- Euglyphis maculata (Dognin, 1916)
- Euglyphis maculella Bryk, 1953
- Euglyphis magnaevia (Dognin, 1923)
- Euglyphis manaosa Schaus, 1936
- Euglyphis marbodia Schaus, 1940
- Euglyphis maria (Schaus, 1910)
- Euglyphis marica Schaus, 1936
- Euglyphis marissima (Dognin, 1912)
- Euglyphis marna Schaus, 1896
- Euglyphis mediana (Schaus, 1896)
- Euglyphis medinensis Schaus, 1936
- Euglyphis medioclara (Schaus, 1905)
- Euglyphis melaina Draudt, 1927
- Euglyphis melancholica (Butler, 1878)
- Euglyphis melca (Schaus, 1905)
- Euglyphis mendosa Draudt, 1927
- Euglyphis metrana Schaus, 1936
- Euglyphis minuta (Dognin, 1907)
- Euglyphis mizera Draudt, 1927
- Euglyphis modesta (Druce, 1887)
- Euglyphis moeschleri Heppner, 1996
- Euglyphis moisa (Dognin, 1912)
- Euglyphis morens (Schaus, 1905)
- Euglyphis moridens Schaus, 1936
- Euglyphis mucida Draudt, 1927
- Euglyphis mulieraria Schaus, 1936
- Euglyphis murina (Möschler, 1878)
- Euglyphis mus (Dognin, 1916)
- Euglyphis mya (Schaus, 1905)
- Euglyphis namora (Schaus, 1905)
- Euglyphis napala (Schaus, 1905)
- Euglyphis napalita Draudt, 1927
- Euglyphis napaloides (Dognin, 1912)
- Euglyphis napalona Draudt, 1927
- Euglyphis naraxa (Schaus, 1906)
- Euglyphis narceta (Schaus, 1905)
- Euglyphis nardina (Dognin, 1916)
- Euglyphis nebula (Schaus, 1910)
- Euglyphis necopina (Dognin, 1916)
- Euglyphis necopinella (Dognin, 1916)
- Euglyphis nennia Schaus, 1936
- Euglyphis nigropunctata (Schaus, 1905)
- Euglyphis nocens (Herrich-Schäffer)
- Euglyphis nubiplena (Dognin, 1918)
- Euglyphis nysaea (Dognin, 1923)
- Euglyphis nystamma (Dyar, 1912)
- Euglyphis obliterata (Schaus, 1905)
- Euglyphis obsessa (Dognin, 1912)
- Euglyphis obtusa (Herrich-Schäffer)
- Euglyphis ochropyga (C.Felder & R.Felder, 1874)
- Euglyphis ocyroe (Dognin, 1891)
- Euglyphis ogenes (Herrich-Schäffer, 1854)
- Euglyphis olivetta Schaus, 1936
- Euglyphis onesca (Schaus, 1905)
- Euglyphis onoba (Druce, 1906)
- Euglyphis orgyia Draudt, 1927
- Euglyphis oslacia Schaus, 1936
- Euglyphis ozora (Druce, 1899)
- Euglyphis palma (Schaus, 1905)
- Euglyphis palota Schaus, 1900
- Euglyphis pangoana Durand, 2021
- Euglyphis panselene Dyar, 1928
- Euglyphis parepa (Schaus, 1905)
- Euglyphis pastica (Schaus, 1905)
- Euglyphis patchetti Schaus, 1936
- Euglyphis petronella Schaus, 1936
- Euglyphis petrovna (Schaus, 1905)
- Euglyphis phedonionides (Schaus, 1912)
- Euglyphis phidonia (Stoll, 1782)
- Euglyphis phyllis (Schaus, 1910)
- Euglyphis pira (Druce, 1899)
- Euglyphis plana (Walker, 1855)
- Euglyphis planita Schaus, 1924
- Euglyphis poasia (Schaus, 1910)
- Euglyphis pompilus Dognin, 1892
- Euglyphis praedicabilis Draudt, 1927
- Euglyphis primola Schaus, 1927
- Euglyphis princeps (Dognin, 1912)
- Euglyphis prodiga Draudt, 1927
- Euglyphis propinqua (Walker, 1866)
- Euglyphis pseudamida (Dognin, 1912)
- Euglyphis pumayaca Schaus, 1936
- Euglyphis punctana Walker, 1855
- Euglyphis punctigera (Dognin, 1922)
- Euglyphis punctulata (Dognin, 1912)
- Euglyphis putrida (Schaus, 1905)
- Euglyphis pygma Schaus, 1900
- Euglyphis quassa Draudt, 1928
- Euglyphis quercifolia Draudt, 1927
- Euglyphis rages (Druce, 1899)
- Euglyphis ragesina Draudt, 1927
- Euglyphis rapina (Dognin, 1923)
- Euglyphis rearensis Schaus, 1936
- Euglyphis rectidivisa Dognin, 1923
- Euglyphis renesca (Schaus, 1905)
- Euglyphis resarta Draudt, 1927
- Euglyphis resina Schaus, 1936
- Euglyphis retrita Draudt, 1927
- Euglyphis reversa Draudt, 1927
- Euglyphis revincta Draudt, 1927
- Euglyphis riphea Stoll, 1782
- Euglyphis rivulosa Drury, 1773
- Euglyphis roseimaculata (Dognin, 1912)
- Euglyphis roseonigra (Dognin, 1912)
- Euglyphis roxana (Schaus, 1905)
- Euglyphis rubresca Bryk, 1953
- Euglyphis rubrica Draudt, 1928
- Euglyphis rundala (Schaus, 1905)
- Euglyphis salandria (Schaus, 1905)
- Euglyphis salebrosa Draudt, 1927
- Euglyphis scaptia (Dognin, 1916)
- Euglyphis schadei Schaus, 1924
- Euglyphis scripturata (Dognin, 1916)
- Euglyphis semifunebris (Schaus, 1915)
- Euglyphis semita (Schaus, 1905)
- Euglyphis senucis Schaus, 1924
- Euglyphis serapion Schaus, 1924
- Euglyphis signifera (Dognin, 1920)
- Euglyphis sigurda (Schaus, 1910)
- Euglyphis simia (Dognin, 1901)
- Euglyphis similavis (Kaye, 1924)
- Euglyphis simiola Draudt, 1927
- Euglyphis skaptiodes (Dognin, 1923)
- Euglyphis sobrina (Schaus, 1910)
- Euglyphis sommeri Draudt, 1927
- Euglyphis sonia (Schaus, 1910)
- Euglyphis spectans Draudt, 1927
- Euglyphis spreta Draudt, 1927
- Euglyphis spurcata Draudt, 1927
- Euglyphis subguttularis (Dognin, 1901)
- Euglyphis submarginalis (Walker, 1866)
- Euglyphis subterranea (Dognin, 1912)
- Euglyphis sulcata (Dognin, 1912)
- Euglyphis sulga (Schaus, 1905)
- Euglyphis supertheresa (Dognin, 1916)
- Euglyphis sura (Schaus, 1905)
- Euglyphis suramis Schaus, 1924
- Euglyphis sylpha Dognin, 1923
- Euglyphis taeda Draudt, 1927
- Euglyphis talma (Schaus, 1905)
- Euglyphis tamila (Schaus, 1905)
- Euglyphis tamira Schaus, 1936
- Euglyphis tanta Draudt, 1927
- Euglyphis tapajoza Schaus, 1936
- Euglyphis temblora (Schaus, 1905)
- Euglyphis temperata Draudt, 1927
- Euglyphis tenuata (Dognin, 1923)
- Euglyphis teramba Schaus, 1936
- Euglyphis terasita Schaus, 1936
- Euglyphis teresina (Schaus, 1905)
- Euglyphis terranea (Butler, 1878)
- Euglyphis theresa Schaus, 1892
- Euglyphis thyatira (Druce, 1887)
- Euglyphis tirmina Schaus, 1936
- Euglyphis tornipuncta (Schaus, 1905)
- Euglyphis torrida (Schaus, 1910)
- Euglyphis tosticrista Draudt, 1927
- Euglyphis tupmila Schaus, 1936
- Euglyphis umbrona Bryk, 1953
- Euglyphis umbrosa (Dognin, 1912)
- Euglyphis unda (Dognin, 1912)
- Euglyphis valentinae Durand, 2021
- Euglyphis vandrilla Schaus, 1934
- Euglyphis varma (Schaus, 1905)
- Euglyphis vecina (Schaus, 1905)
- Euglyphis venalia Schaus, 1896
- Euglyphis victoris Dognin, 1892
- Euglyphis viridescens (Dognin, 1916)
- Euglyphis viridiflava (Schaus, 1905)
- Euglyphis viridisuffusa Schaus, 1936
- Euglyphis vistorica Schaus, 1924
- Euglyphis vithersi (Schaus, 1905)
- Euglyphis vitripuncta Schaus, 1896
- Euglyphis vittabunda (Dyar, 1914)
- Euglyphis xingua Schaus, 1936
- Euglyphis yahuarmaya Schaus, 1936
- Euglyphis zemira (Druce, 1900)
- Euglyphis zenona Schaus, 1936
- Euglyphis zikani Draudt, 1927
- Euglyphis zurcheri (Druce, 1897)
