= Death in ancient Greek art =

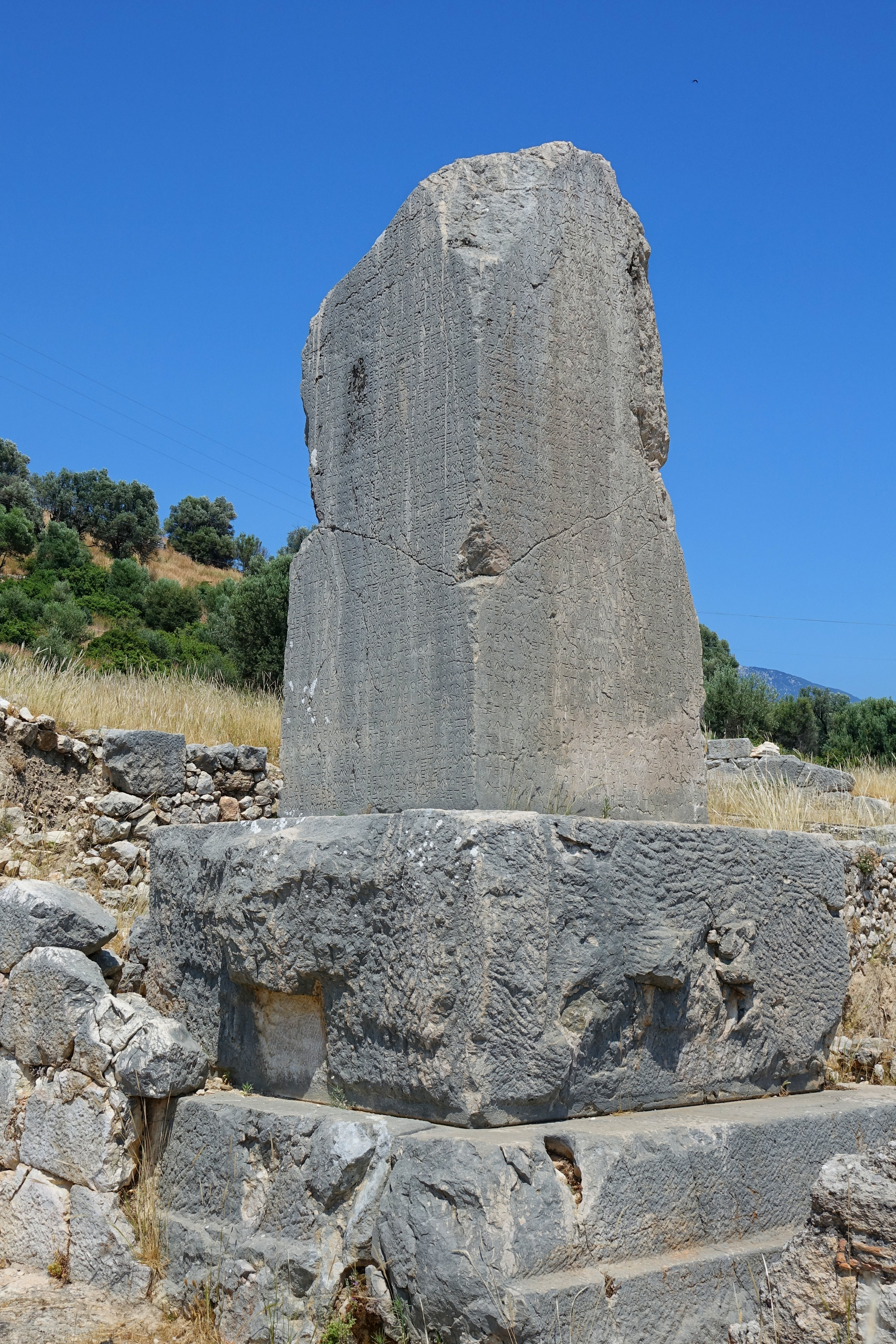
The Xanthian Obelisk

The theme of death within ancient Greek art has continued from the Early Bronze Age all the way through to the Hellenistic period. The Greeks used architecture, pottery, and funerary objects as different mediums through which to portray death. These depictions include mythical deaths, deaths of historical figures, and commemorations of those who died in war. This page includes various examples of the different types of mediums in which death is presented in Greek art.

== Examples of architecture ==
Greek heroa were tombs dedicated to both mythological and actual heroes of the Ancient Greek world. These tombs contained the remains of the hero and acted as a place where citizens of the polis where the tomb was located could hold feasts as a hero cult in order to honor the hero. They were built in a variety of different styles, were located in many different polis across Greece, and their legacy was continued by the Romans.

The heroon at Nemea is an example of a hero shrine, the resting place of the late Opheltes and a place for Greeks to worship. The heroon was a way to memorialize the infant and transform his legacy from that of a mere mortal to that of a hero. Opheltes' death elevated him above the status of other humans and made him more divine, and thus his final resting place became a sacred space to Greeks. The ancient Greeks would use this space and the surrounding land to host the Nemean Games in Opheltes' honor, as well as practice magic and other cult activities.

The grave monument from Kallithea is an example of a funerary monument from the Hellenistic period. They were for wealthy people and families that served to remind the living of the power and wealth of the dead by exhibiting conspicuous consumption. This monument was for a Greek family from Histria, Greek colony in modern Romania, who became prominent in Athens in the 300s. The grave monument had a podium, pedestal, a frieze, and a naiskos with statues of two family members and a slave inside. These grave monument largely disappeared in Attica after an austerity law that banned them.

The tombs at Xanthos, Lycia, are funerary architecture that display the cultural synthesis enacted by a Lycian Dynasty. The tombs at Xanthos primarily take the form of pillar tombs, which were composed of a stone burial chamber on top of a stone pillar. The decorative motifs surrounding many of the elevated burial chambers depicts Near Eastern imagery, with roots in Persia. However, the Lycian rulers employed Greek artisans to carve the relief sculptures, primarily in the Archaic style. Thus, the monumentalization of the dead rulers is accompanied by regionally-specific visual motifs that bring together both Greek and Near Eastern influences.

Brasidas was a successful Spartan General who won a major battle in Amphipolis during the second Peloponnesian War. After Brasidas died, the people of Amphipolis monumentalized him by cremating him, placing his ashes in a silver ossuary with a gold wreath, and burying him in a cist grave within the city walls. Sparta also dedicated a cenotaph in his honor. His legacy was remembered and celebrated with these things and contributes to the theme of monumentalization of important Greek figures after death.

== Examples of pottery and painters ==
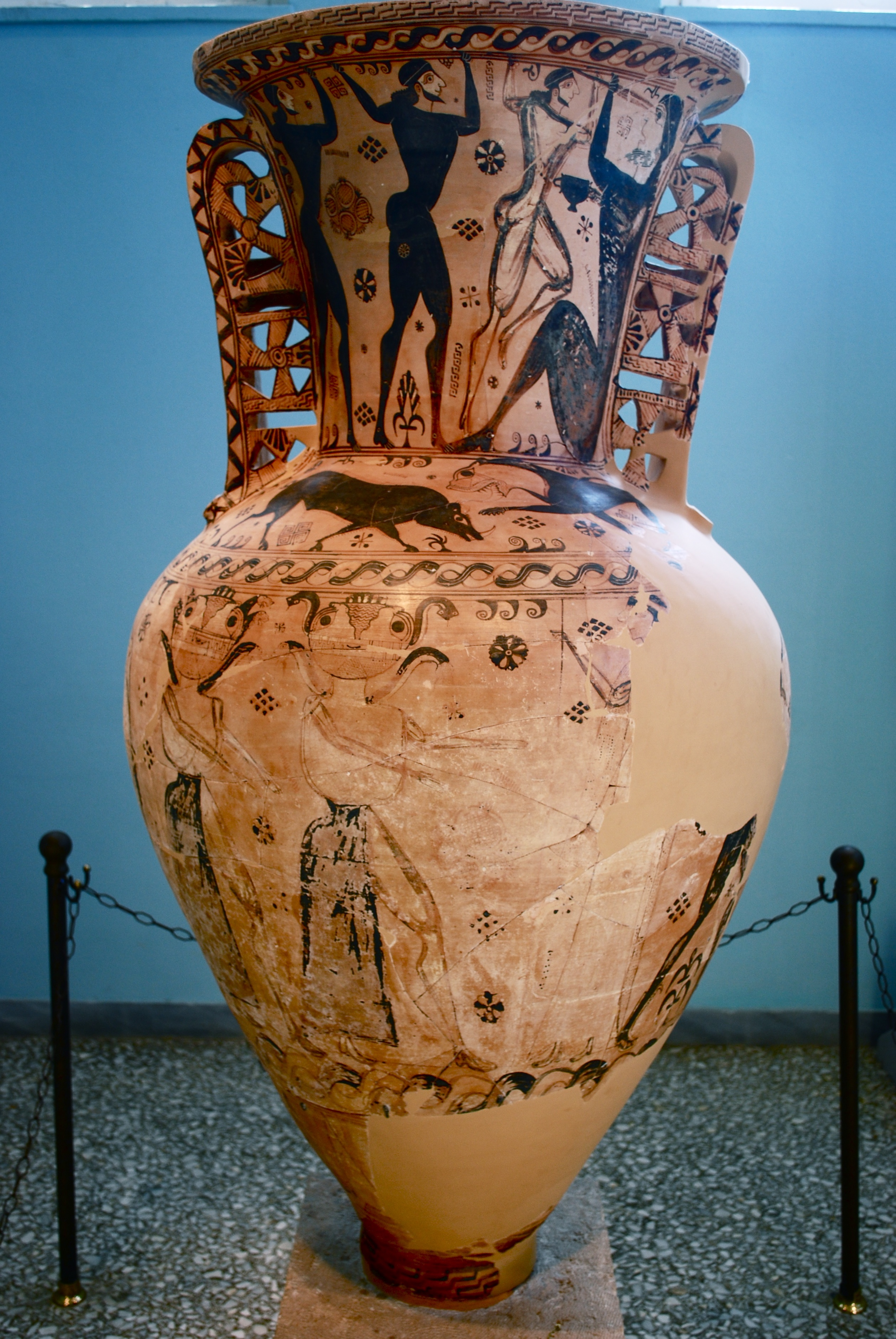
The Eleusis Amphora

The Pelike of Odysseus and Elpenor is a jar from Attika in 440 BCE. It portrays Elpenor begging Odysseus to give him a proper burial. Elpenor had drunkenly fallen off the roof of a boat and his death went unnoticed which means he did not get his burial rights and could not proceed through his journey in the underworld. Hermes stands next to Odysseus watching over the scene as he a guide for the dead.

The Thanatos Painter is a lekythoi painter from Athens, Greece in the 5th century BCE. The lekythoi attributed to the Thanatos Painter are all white-ground that is specifically used in the funerary context. These lekythoi also had depiction of death on them and thanatos is the Greek word for death. They were used as grave markers and would hold special oil used for funerals.

Another example of pottery being used in funerary contexts is the Eleusis Amphora by the Polyphemos painter, which is a neck amphora that dates back to the Middle Protoattic (c. 650–625 BCE). The amphora's decoration reflects the pottery of the Orientalizing period (c. 710–600 BCE), a style in which human and animal figures depict mythological scenes. It was used as an urn, as it was found to contain the remains of a young boy.

Ancient Greek funerary vases were made to resemble vessels used for elite male drinking parties, called symposiums. Funerary vases were often painted with symposiums, or Greek tragedies that involved death. There are many types of funerary vases including amphorae, kraters, oinochoe, and kylix cups. Funerary scenes show us how the Greeks treated the deceased. Such ritualistic practices included laying out the body for mourners to see, called prothesis. An example of this was painted on the Dipylon amphora. Next, was the ekphora, which is the moving of the body to a cemetery, usually in a procession occurring before dawn. If cremation was practiced, then the ashes of the deceased would be placed inside the funerary vase, and buried. After the interment process, the death would often be commemorated by the family through a large custom-made funerary vase that would at times portray the dead's current pathway through the underworld.

The Odysseus in the Underworld krater is a Lucanian kalyx-krater decorated in the red-figure style dating to dating to c. 380 BCE – c. 360 BCE. Side A of the krater depicts Homer's story of Odysseus's visit to the Underworld to consult the dead seer Teiresias. This meeting is known as a nekromanteion or "consultation with the dead". Side B depicts the judgment of Paris where Hermes asks Paris, the Trojan prince, to arbitrate the contest between Aphrodite, Hera, and Athena and determine who is the most beautiful.

The suicide of Ajax vase was made by Exekias during the Archaic Period. The scene depicts Ajax preparing for his suicide in black-figure on a neck amphora. Ajax is bent over his sword, which he is placing in the ground. There is a tree to one side of him and his suit of armor on the other side. This scene is unusual in Greek art because it depicts the moment right before the death, rather than the violence of the actual death.

The Dipylon krater from Athens displays representations of funerary rituals for death and burial. The prothesis was a public "laying out" of the deceased similar to a modern wake, and the ekphora was a transportation of the body to the grave for burial. These rituals coincided with intense grief and extravagance, as those closest to the deceased attempted to mourn and celebrate his death.

Depictions of the death of Iphigenia are mostly on pottery. She was a young girl who was to be the sacrifice for Agamemnon's mistake. Pottery depictions of this mythological story are of two different versions. One where she dies, and the other is where her body is replaced with the corpse of an animal by Artemis, who saves her. The pottery depictions are mostly by the black-figure and red-figure techniques. They are also mostly amphoras and kraters.

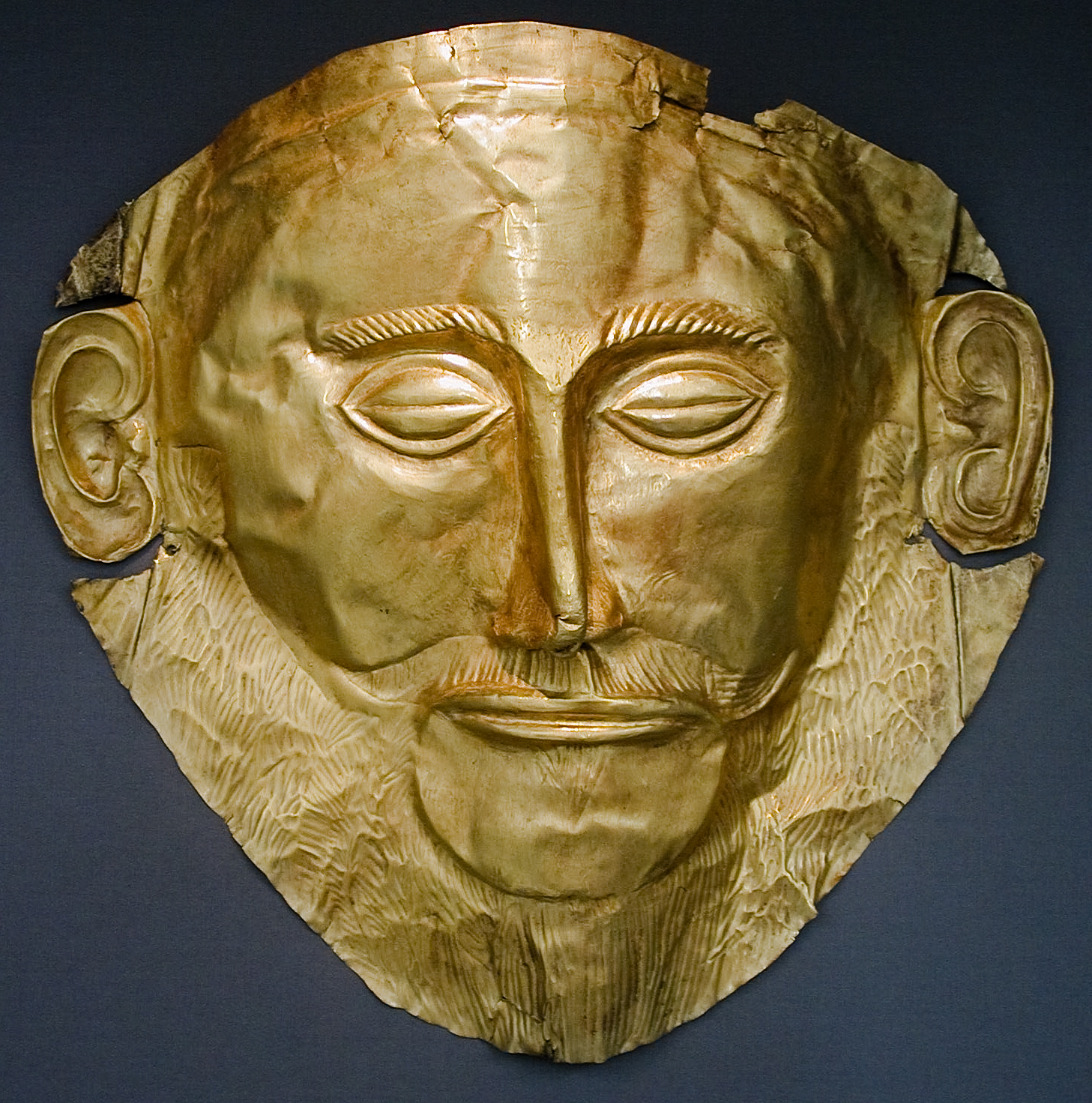
Agamemnon mask, one of the death masks of Mycenae.

== Examples of grave stelai and goods ==
The stelai which mark the burials in Grave Circles A and B in Mycenae demonstrate burial practices during the Late Bronze Age. Some of the stelai feature relief sculpture, including chariot scenes, hunting scenes, and spiral motifs. These scenes could potentially indicate a desire for display and conspicuous consumption and hint at the presence of warfare and social stratification at Mycenae.

The death masks of Mycenae, for example the Mask of Agamemnon, are a collection of golden masks placed on male dead bodies entombed within circular grave sites located at the city of Mycenae. They are designed to represent the features of the deceased, immortalizing them after death. They also display the status of the deceased through conspicuous consumption, due to their valuable materials.

After finding a phenomenal amount of gold grave goods at Grave Circles A and B at Mycenae, the location earned the nickname "Golden Mycenae". It was a successful and wealthy area during the Bronze Age and the families buried in the shaft graves there memorialized their status using gold grave goods. They also distinguished which graves were for men and which were for women using grave goods. Generally, the men were buried with gold inlaid weapons while the women had gold jewelry, and both boasted their family's wealth.

The hellenistic stelai from Demetrias used art styles and sculpting techniques from the Hellenistic period to commemorate the deceased. Marble and stone stele were decorated with full and diverse colors which were used to depict both scenes from life and scenes from myth. By looking at grave stele such as "Aphrodeisia, Daughter of Theudotos," we can learn what life and art for Greeks during the hellenistic period was like.

== See also ==
- Ancient Greek art
