= Death masks of Mycenae =

Archaeological finds

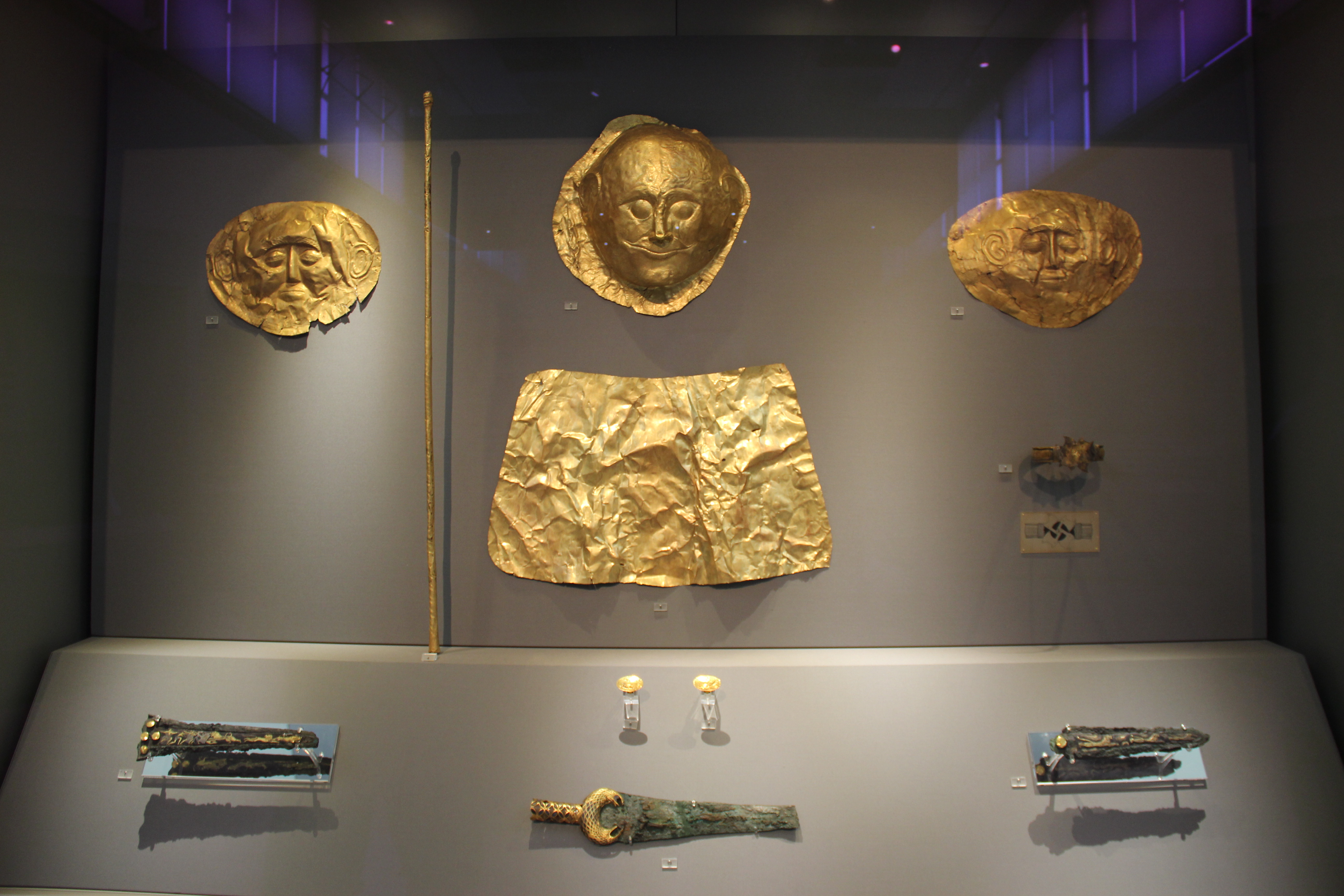
Several Mycenaean gold funerary masks in the National Archaeological Museum, Athens

The death masks of Mycenae are a series of golden funerary masks found on buried bodies within a burial site titled Grave Circle A, located within the ancient Greek city of Mycenae. There are seven discovered masks in total, found with the burials of six adult males and one male child. There were no women who had masks. They were discovered by Heinrich Schliemann during his 1876 excavation of Mycenae.

There is also a death mask found in Grave Circle B, but it differs from the Circle A masks both in material, as it is made from electrum, and placement, as it was placed in a container besides an entombed body, rather than being placed upon the deceased. The relative scarcity of death masks in Grave Circle B indicate that the buried dead were of lesser wealth or status, rather than Grave Circle A with an abundance of material made from valuable materials, such as the Death masks.

== Design ==
The masks of Grave Circle A share similar features. They are made of a flat foil-like layer of gold and depict round, bald faces, with round eyes and prominent ears. The example picture depicts an elderly face, with lines that may either depict a mustache, or wrinkles, over a smiling mouth.

These were made by chiseling fine facial details into a flat sheet of gold which had first been pounded against a wooden mold. This is an example of the repoussé style of adding detail to metal works.

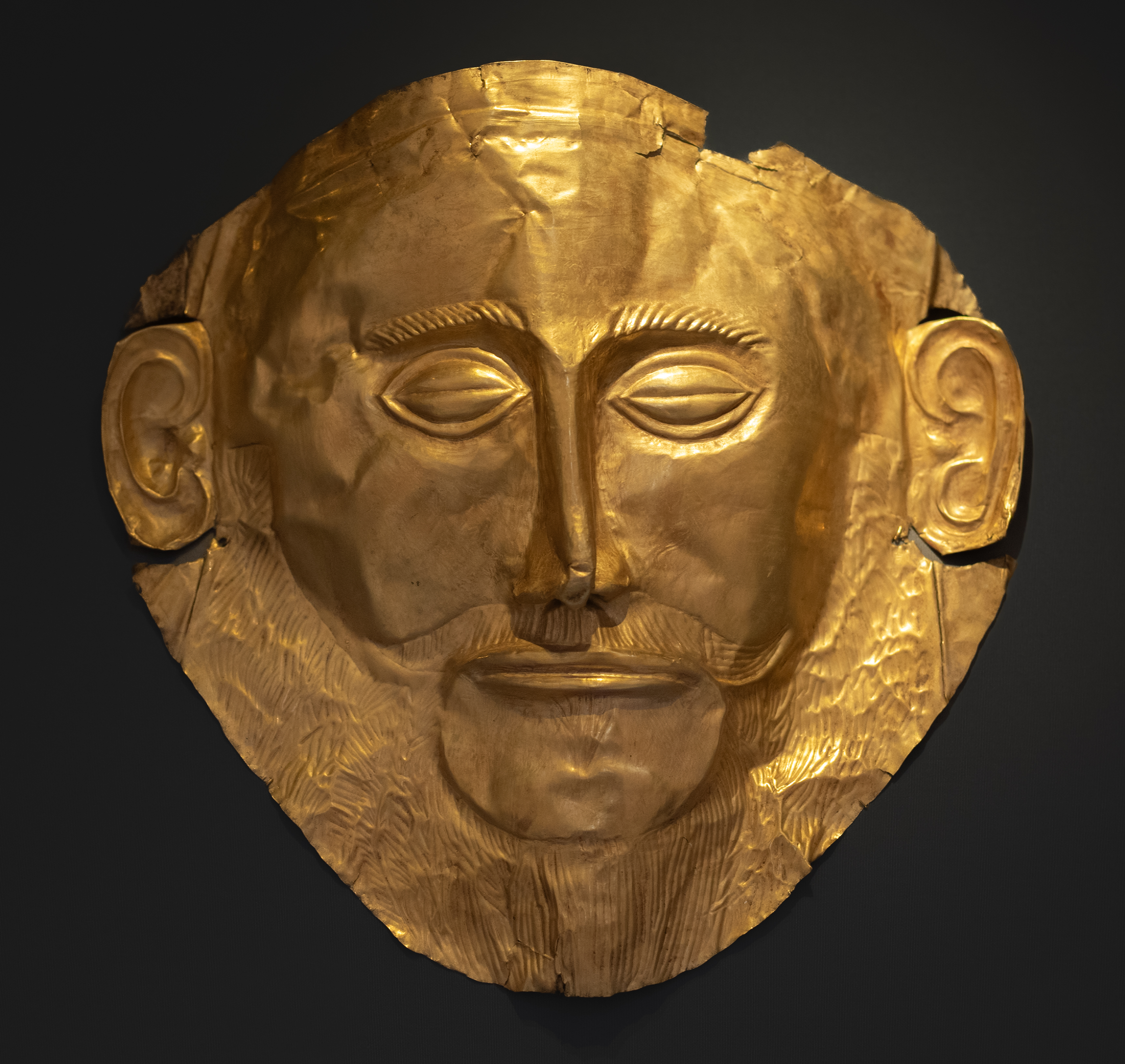
Mask of Agamemnon, found in the Grave Circle A, Mycenae, Grave V

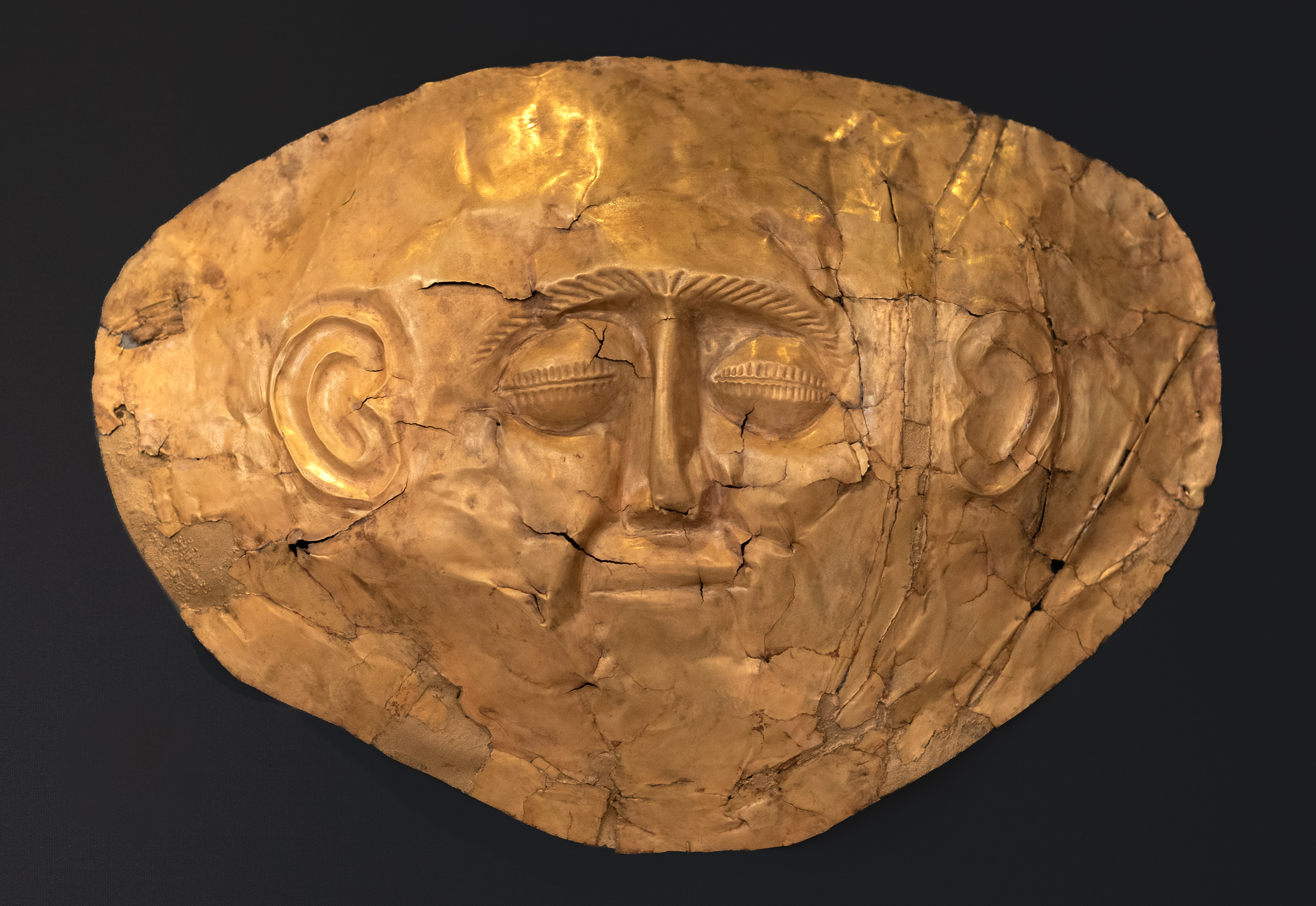
Mask from a Mycenaean Grave Circle.

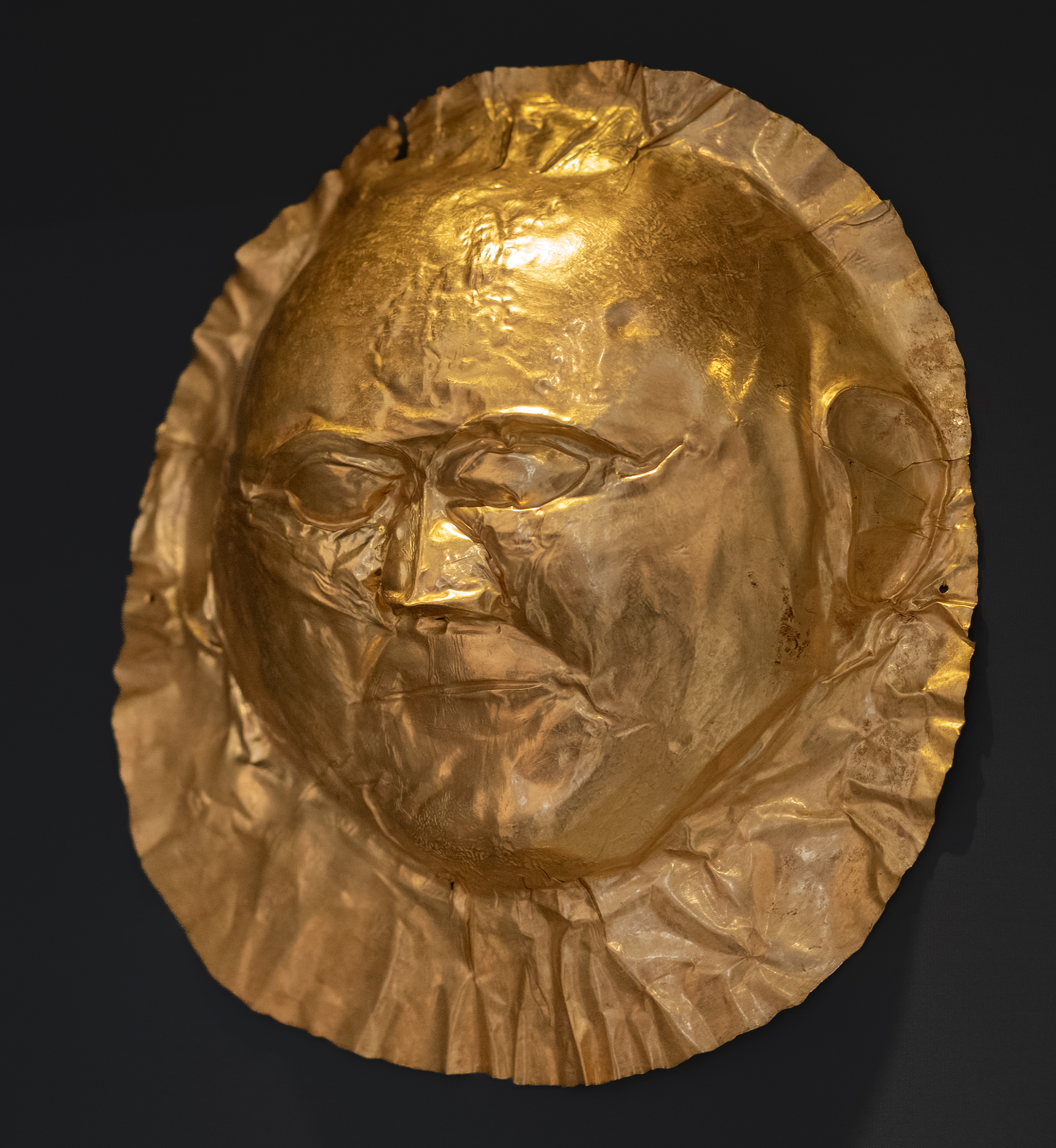
Mask from Grave Circle A, Grave IV

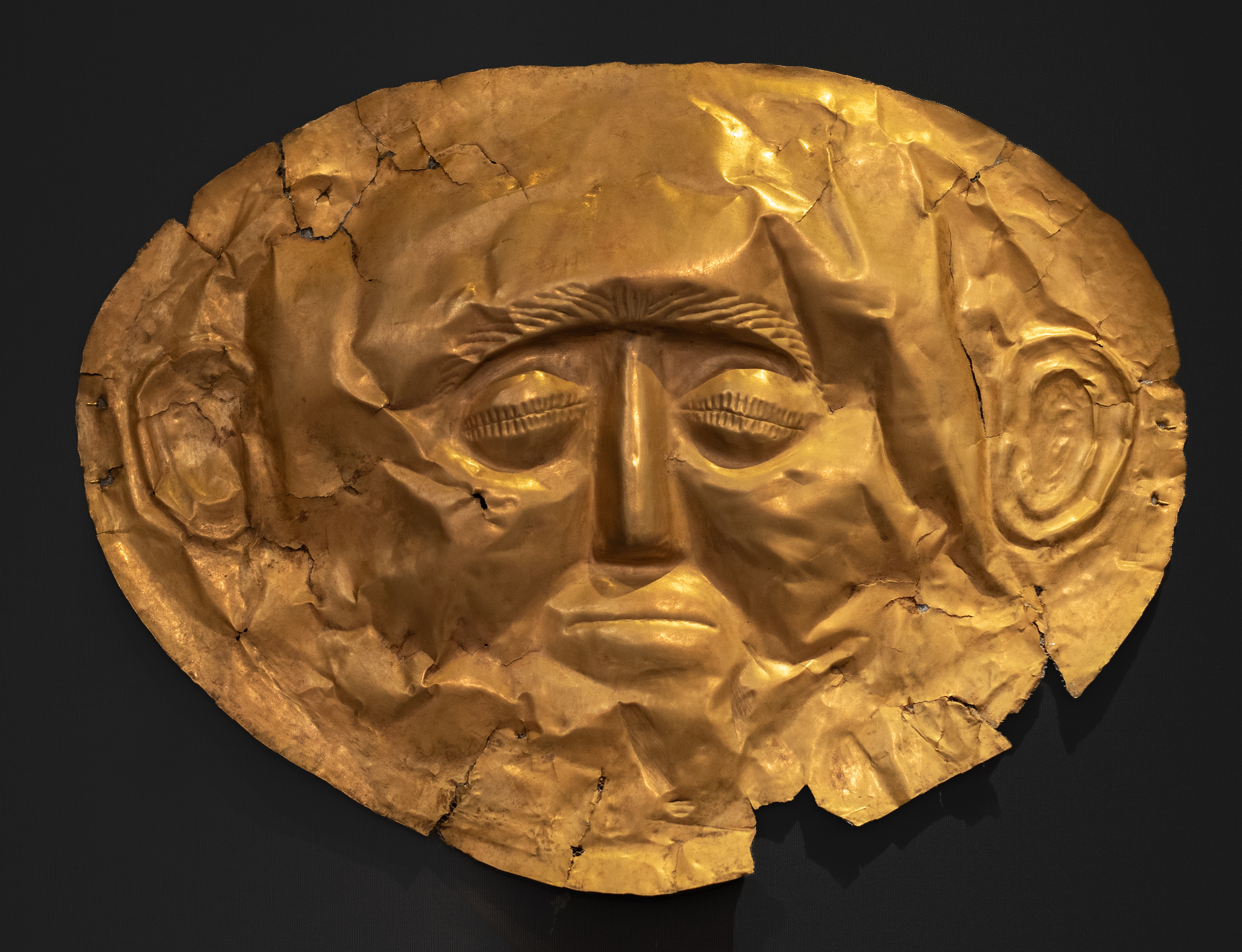
Mask from Grave Circle A, Grave IV

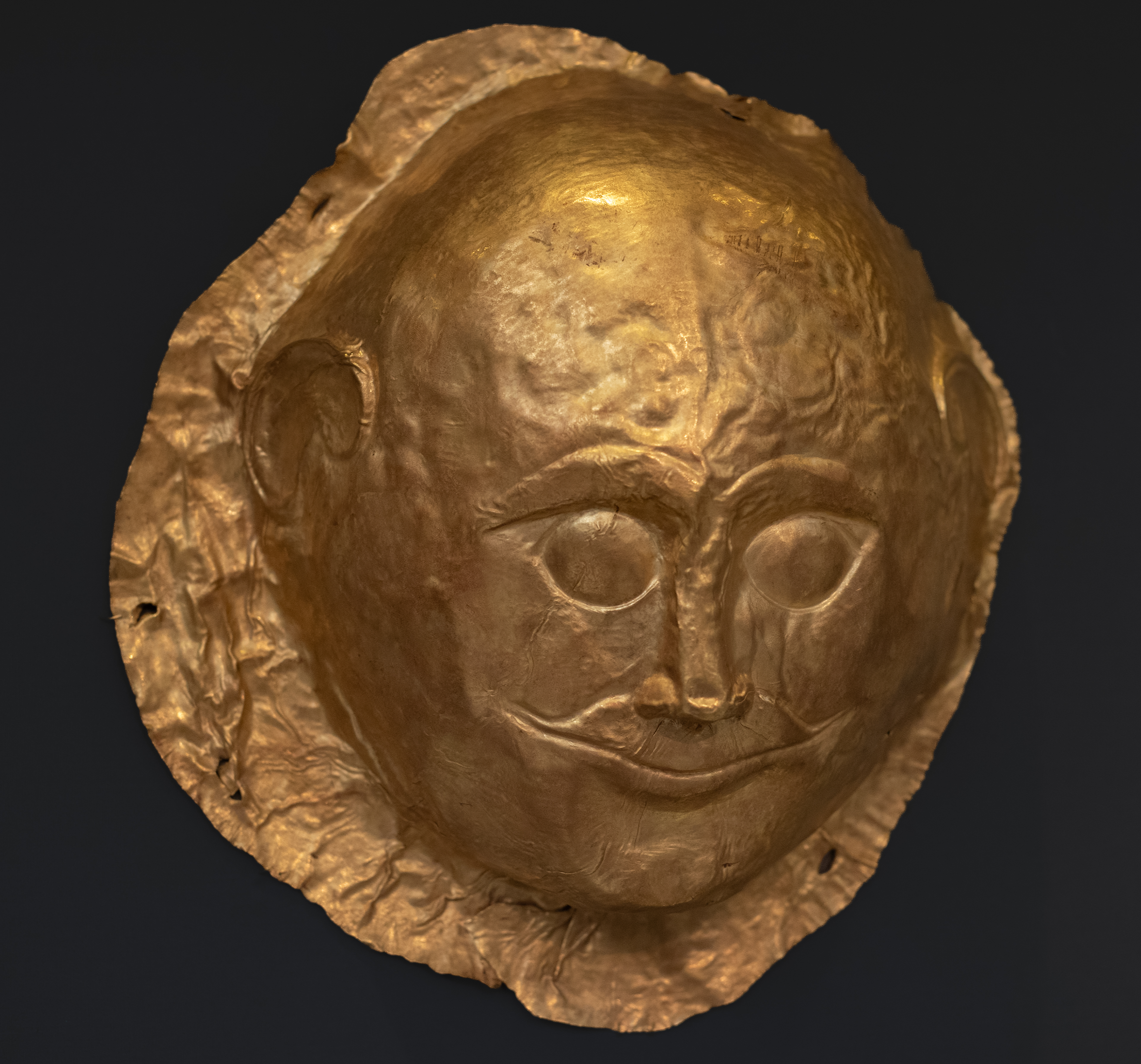
Gold male death-mask made of sheet metal with repoussé details portraying the deceased's eyes opened, the only one in Shaft Grave IV

== Analysis ==
Schliemann claimed that one of the masks he discovered was the mask of King Agamemnon, and that this was the burial site of the legendary king from Homer's Iliad.

The masks were likely direct representations of the deceased, symbolizing a continuation of the dead's identity in death, similar to funerary statues and incisions, immortalizing an idealized depiction of the deceased. The masks were not found on all the bodies inside the grave site, indicating that those who had them were of special status, and that the golden masks are a form of conspicuous consumption.

Funerary masks like the ones found at Mycenae have not been found anywhere else in Mycenaean culture, and only a few of the bodies at Grave Sites bear masks.

== See also ==
- Death in ancient Greek art
