= Odysseus in the Underworld krater =

Historical artifact

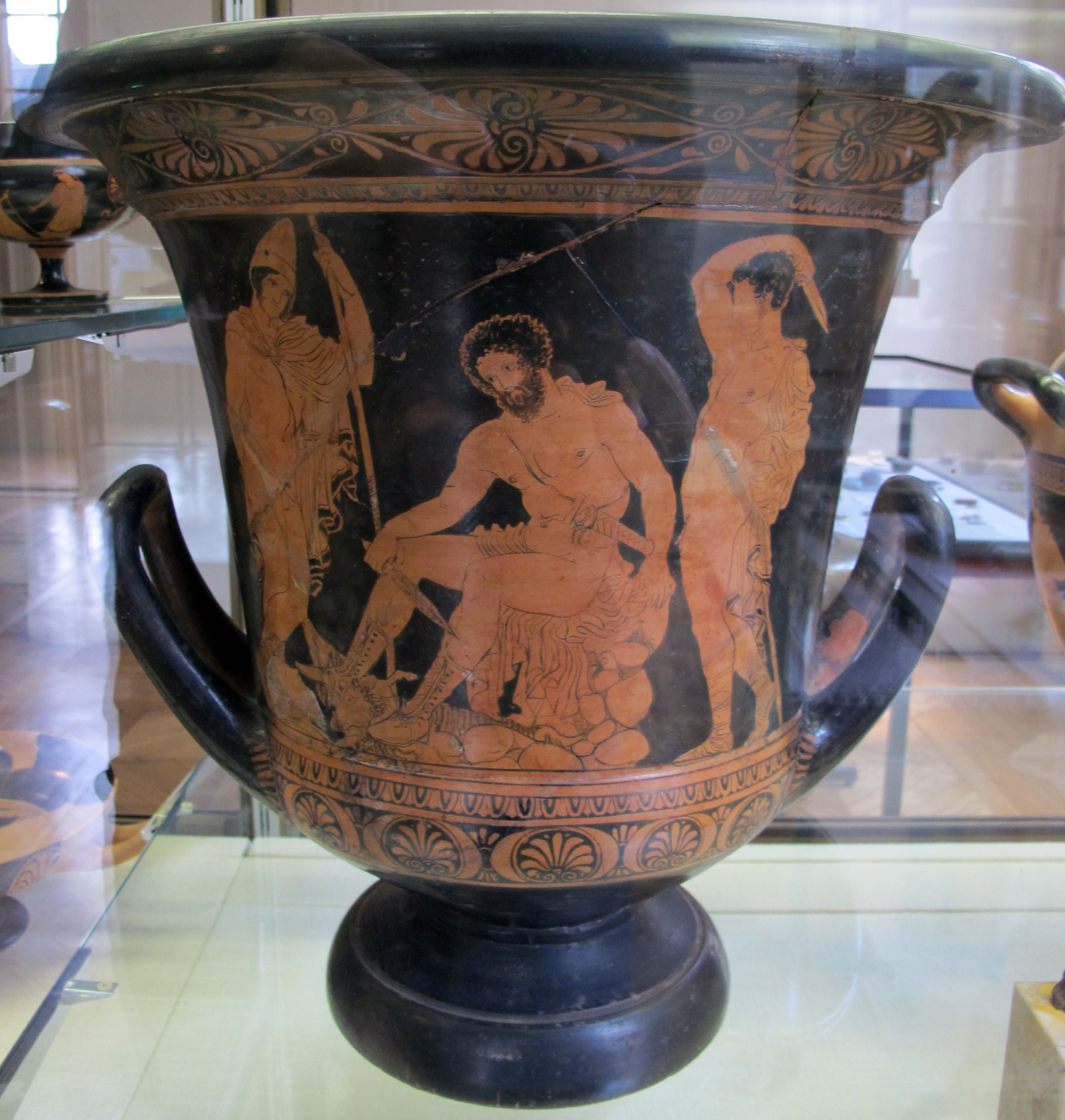
Odysseus in the Underworld Krater

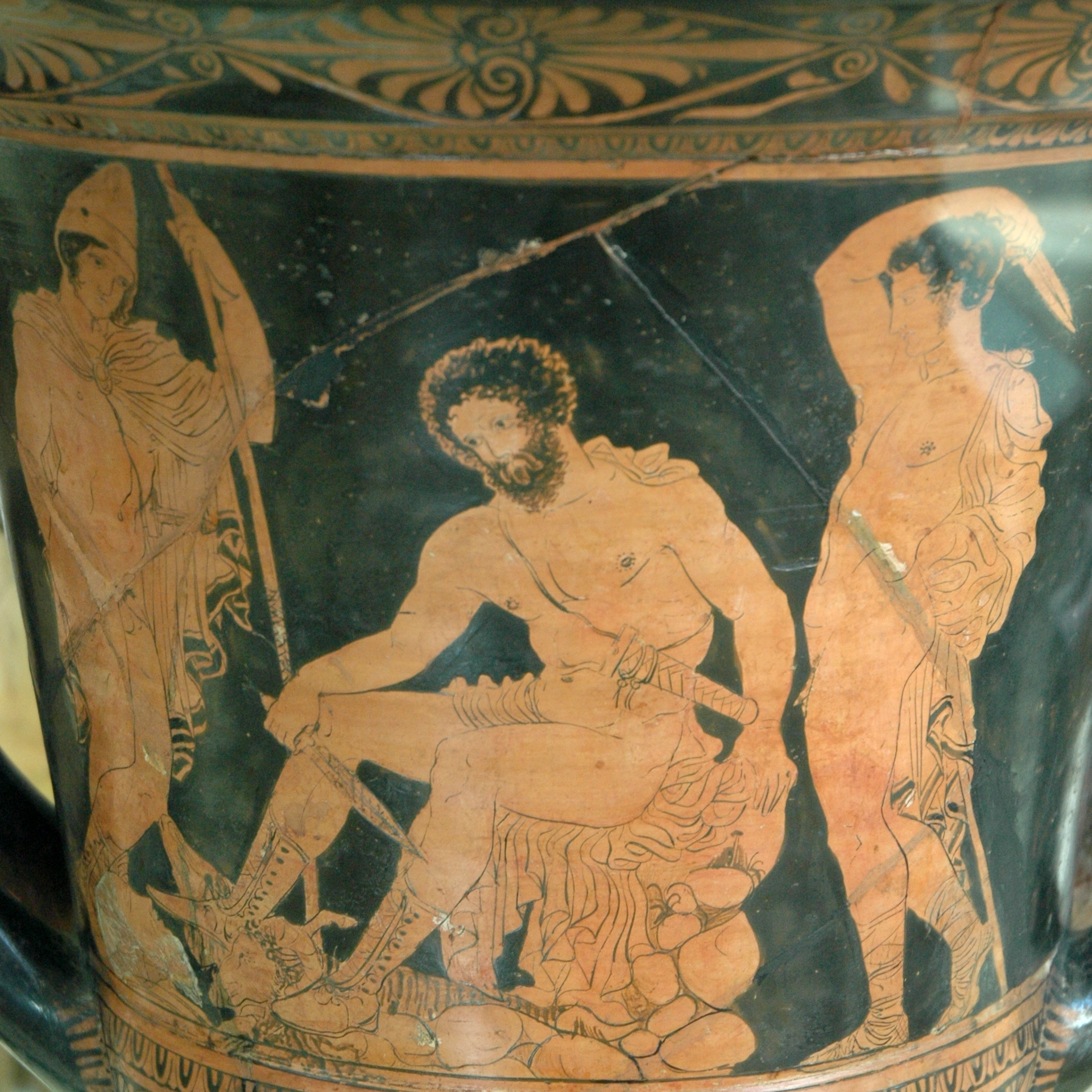
Odysseus, seated between Eurylochos and Perimedes, consulting the shade of Tiresias; to left Eurylochos wearing pilos and chlamys. Side A from a Lucanian red-figured calyx-krater.

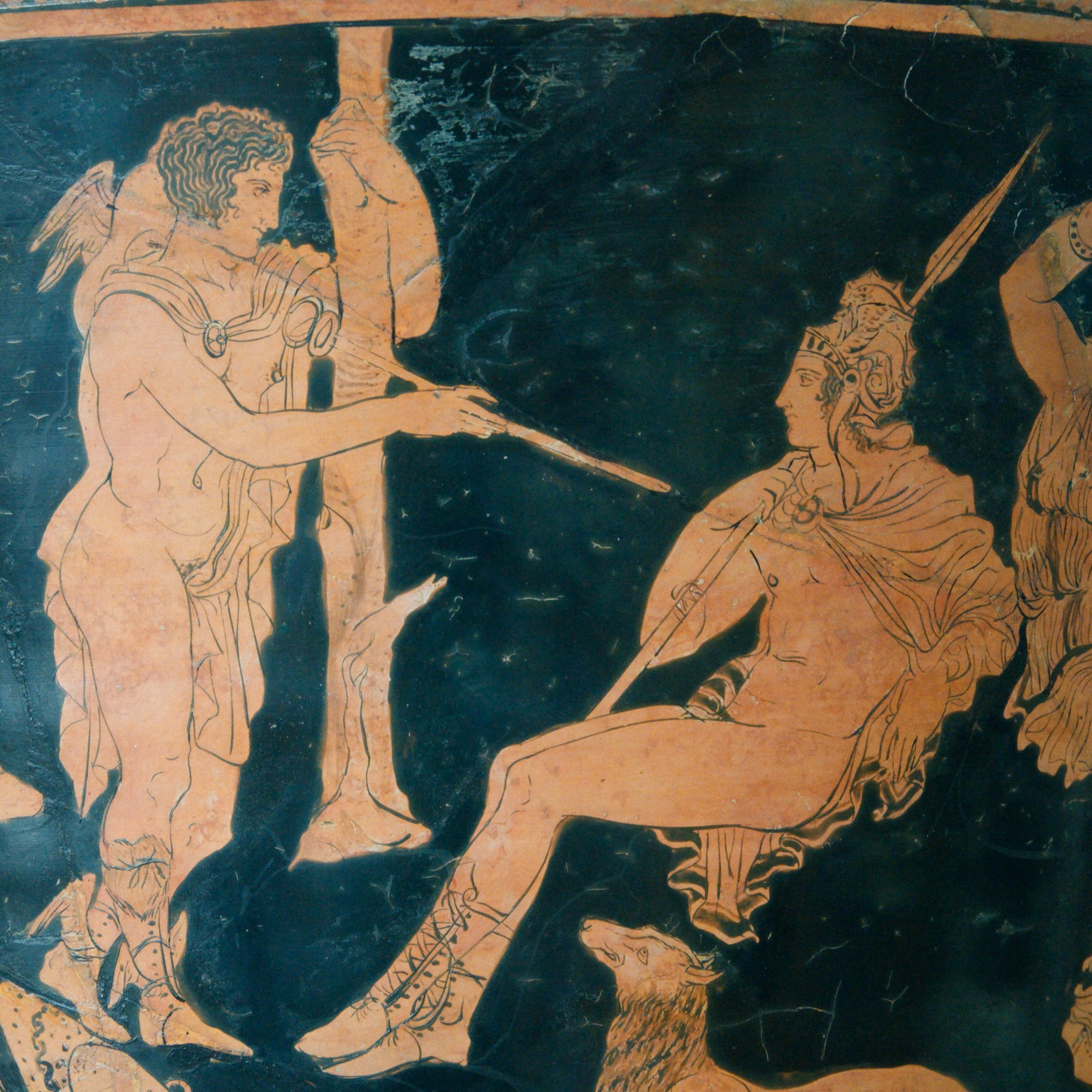
Hermes (on the left) asking Paris to arbitrate the contest between Athena, Aphrodite and Hera. Detail, side B from a Lucanian red-figured calyx-krater.

The Odysseus in the Underworld krater is a Lucanian calyx krater decorated in the red-figure style dating to ca. 380 BC – ca. 360 BC. It was found in Pisticci, south Italy and is believed to be the work of the Dolon painter, a famous Lucanian red-figure vase painter who worked in the Metaponto workshop and had a particular affinity for large krateres and mythological scenes. The krater is now at the Bibliothèque Nationale in Paris.

== Measurements ==
The kalyx-krater used measures at 48.4 cm in height and 49.8 cm in diameter. It has a pair of curved handles emerging from the lower body of the vessel and sprouting outward to the lip.

== Depictions ==
=== A side ===
The A-side scene on the belly of the kalyx-krater depicts Homer's story of Odysseus's visit to the Underworld to consult the dead seer Teiresias. This meeting is known as a nekuomanteion or "consultation with the dead".

Odysseus is seated in the middle of the scene on uneven ground; he is seated between Eurylochos, second-in-command of Odysseus' ship during the return to Ithaca after the Trojan War, and Perimedes, one of Odysseus's companions during his return voyage from Troy, awaiting the consultation with the ghost of Teiresias. Odyseus is wearing boots and has a short sword in his right hand. There are two dead rams directly underneath Oddyseus's sword, a sacrifice needed to summon the dead for ghosts cannot speak until they have drunk blood.

=== B side ===
The scene on the B-side of the krater depicts the Judgment of Paris, where Hermes (on left) asks Paris, the Trojan prince, to arbitrate the contest between Aphrodite, Hera, and Athena and determine who is the most beautiful. The scene is so well detailed that many scholars describe the krater as having a “double A-side”.

== See also ==
- Death in ancient Greek art
