= Heroön at Nemea =

Archaeological site in Nemea, Greece

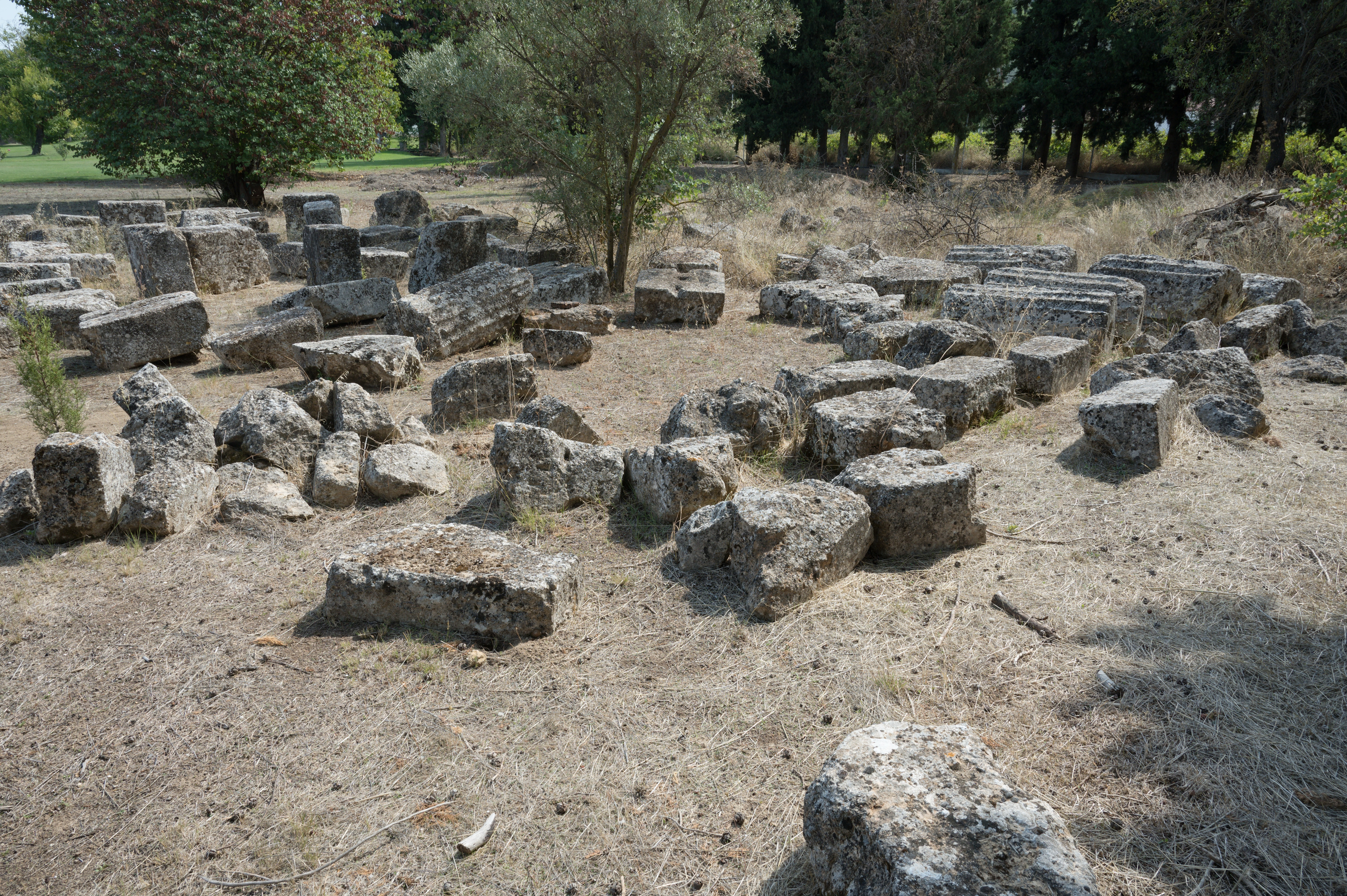

- Location of Nemea in Greece
- 37°49′17″N 22°39′40″E
- Location: Nemea, Greece

Site notes
- Length: 100 metres (330 ft)
- Width: 40 metres (130 ft)

The Heroön at Nemea is 6th century BCE Ancient Greek archaeological site in Nemea in the northeastern Peloponnese, located within the larger Panhellenic sanctuary there. The Heroön (Note: A heroön or heroon (plural heroa) is a shrine used in the practice of hero cult ritual. A heroön was often built over what was traditionally identified as the a hero's tomb or cenotaph.) is an earthen mound situated on the west side of the Nemea river. This shrine was dedicated to the mythological Opheltes (also called Archemoros) and used in the practice of hero cult ritual. The athletic games which took place at the Heroön at Nemea may be the predecessor of the Nemean Games, which according to tradition were established by Heracles. Evidence has been found of cult activities and the practicing of magic at the Heroön. The heroön was in use from the 6th century BCE to the 4th century BCE; its prominence began to wane in the mid-third century BCE after organizers relocated the Nemean games to Argos.

== The Heroön ==
Map of the Sanctuary of Zeus at Nemea; the Heroön is at location 7

The Heroön at Nemea is a mound of earth, 100 metres (330 ft) long and 40 metres (130 ft) at its widest. A five-sided peribolos wall was built around it and the mound flattened after its construction. In the vicinity are an unlined well and reservoir system, and evidence of a hippodrome, running track, and stadium.

== Opheltes and the Nemean Games ==
The Nemean Games began in 573 BCE, near the time of the Heroön's construction. Written sources for the myth of the child-hero Opheltes date only to the early 5th century BCE; the construction of the Heroön likely predated the production of written tales about its hero.

According to the written myth, Opheltes was the son of a king or priest named Lycurgus. At his birth, a seer prophesied that the boy would die in his infancy if allowed to touch the ground before learning to walk. When the Seven against Thebes—a legendary, likely mythical group of champions—stopped in Nemea, they asked Opheltes's nurse Hypsipyle for water. Hypsipyle set the child down in a bed of wild celery to retrieve water for the Seven. This left Opheltes exposed to a serpent, which strangled him to fulfill the prophecy. To honor the dead child, the Seven elevated Opheltes to a hero and held funeral celebrations and athletic events in his name. Victors were awarded crowns of wild celery.

== Artifacts recovered ==
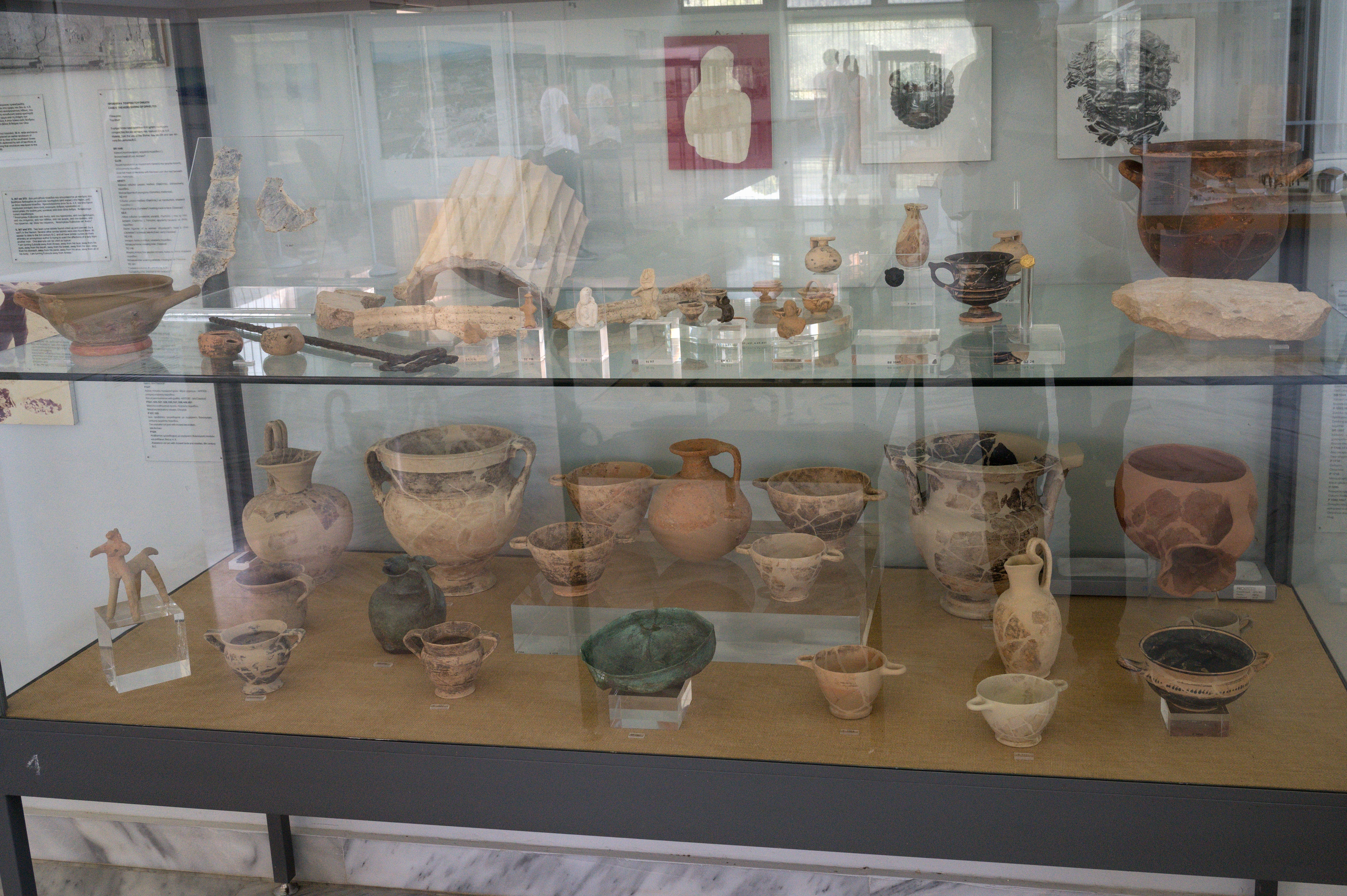
Findings from the hero shrine of Opheltes at Nemea. Archaeological Museum of Nemea, Case 4

Excavations at the Heroön at Nemea have yielded several complete vessels which were intentionally arranged and buried. Archaeologists have also recovered seven lead curse tablets engraved with erotic binding spells, four of which retain legible text. Because Opheltes died violently in infancy, practitioners of magic viewed his shrine as an exceptionally potent site.

Although discovered scattered across the Heroön, the tablets share a uniform manufacturing technique: each was inscribed on a thin lead sheet, folded, and pierced with a nail. The binding spells command that the target be "turn[ed] away" from their lover, systematically invoking various physical and spiritual attributes of the victim to isolate them fully. Variations in handwriting across the tablets indicate that distinct individuals deposited each curse, while the cursive script and letterforms—unattested before the 4th century BCE—suggest that these rituals took place after the Heroön had fallen out of formal use.
