= Jar (pelike) with Odysseus and Elpenor =

Ceramic container used to store and transport liquid

A pelike was a ceramic container that the Greeks used as storage/transportation for wine and olive oil. It had a large belly with thin, open handles. Unlike other transportation jars (like the amphora), a pelike would have a flattened bottom so that it could stand on its own. Pelikes often had one large scene across the belly of the jar with minimal distractions around. This would focus the viewers eyes to the center of the pelike which was often a mythological scene of sorts.

== Historical context ==
This red-figure pelike was created by the Lykaon Painter in the classical period (440 B.C.). During the classical period there were two major shifts in painting, both to do with representation of space. The first change was creating a "foreground" and "background." In order to do this the figures in the higher section were the background while the figures in the lower section were the foreground. The pioneer of this change was Polygnotos of Thasos. The pelike with Odysseus and Elpenor in the Underworld is a great example of this first change. The second change was creating more backdrops for certain literary scenes.

The Lykaon Painter was well known for his unique style and his depiction of mythological scenes. This jar was one of the "earliest and by far most impressive representation in ancient art of a famous passage in the Odyssey."

== Description ==
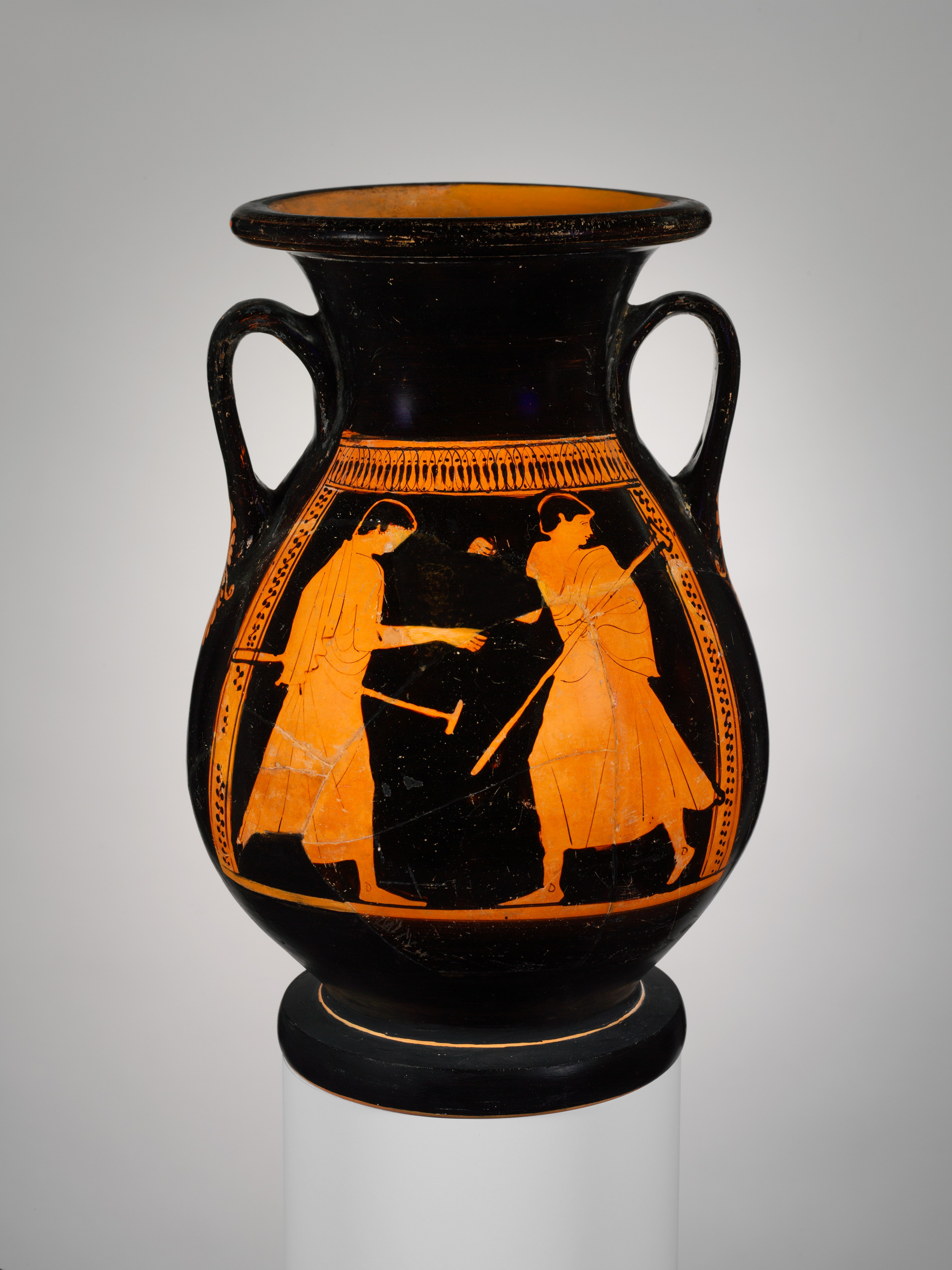
Terracotta pelike jar created in Attica in 430. It is not the pelike that this article is describing, but it is a similar shape.

There were many features used by the Lyakon Painter to depict the mythological scene on this pelike.

- The ground lines to show the rocky landscape and plants crawling up around the edges
- Odysseus' arm is tensed holding the sword which shows he is ready to attack, but his other arm is resting against his leg and holding his head up which indicates a feeling of melancholy. This could represent the hardships he has endured and all the ones he will have to.
- All the characters are looking at Elpenor yet the viewer knows the main focus of the jar is Odysseus because of the details on him and facial expression. Hermes is seen leaning in and almost handing a hand out towards and Elpenor is concentrating on moving towards Odysseus.
- The progression from right to left: the viewer can only see Hermes (far right) in full profile, Odysseus is still in profile but there is a slight twist in his position so the viewer can see more of him, Elpenor (far left) is almost frontal and trying to pull himself.
- Elpenor pulling himself up brings in this idea of irony because in the myth this pelike is depicting Elpenor is a ghost, yet he is the only person in this jar that is actively trying (and struggling) with moving himself when he should be the most free. Elpenor's pose is known as the 3/4 pose which is difficult to paint effectively.
- Hermes is present on the jar which shows that the story is being told from a different point than the story in Homer which does not feature Hermes.

The Lykaon Painter did a fantastic job in characterizing each individual person. Instead of making them generic people and only recognizable through objects, he made them distinct characters. The viewer can see how young Elpenor was when he died. He has no beard and his hair is cut short. On the other hand, Odysseus has a full head of hair and a thick beard. He appears to be still, but the viewer can get a sense of the fighter in him since his foot is tip-toed and ready to spring into action. The hat he wears gives a sense of time. It is different from a helmet used in war, which suggests he is returning home. Hermes facial expression is very neutral which gives a sense of wisdom. Similarly to Odysseus, he looks very still, as his feet are planted on the ground, but his knees are bent which indicates he could jump up to help the two mortals. Normally if there is a God present in a painting, they are the center of attention. In this pelike, the positioning of the people allows for Odysseus to be the center of attention.

== Theme ==
The story depicted on this jar is from a scene in the Odyssey. Odysseus was traveling to the Underworld to speak to a prophet when he ran into his deceased companion, Elpenor. Elpenor was the youngest member of Odysseus' crew. One night on Circe Island, Elpenor drank too much and tried to fall asleep on the roof; however, he fell off in his sleep and died. His death went unnoticed, so he was not given a proper burial and given those rights. Since he died without the proper burial, he is stuck in his journey through the Underworld. This mythological scene is when Odysseus runs into him and Elpenor begs him to give him a proper burial. Odysseus decides to sacrifice two lambs in order for Elpenor to continue through the Underworld. Hermes stands behind Odysseus as he is a guide for lost souls in the Underworld.
