= Hellenistic stelai from Demetrias =

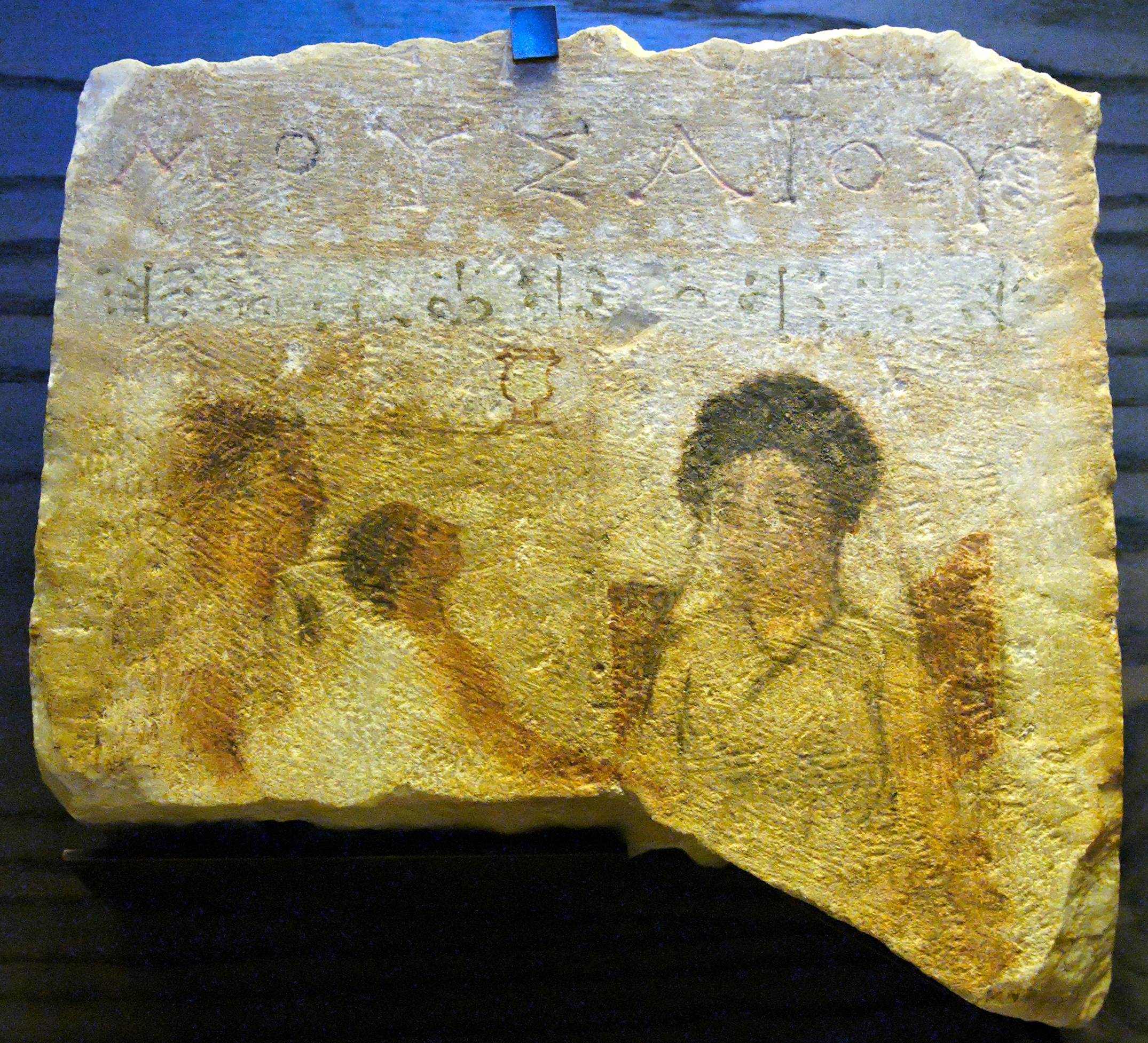
A Painted Stele from Demetrias

In the ancient Greek city of Demetrias in Thessaly, funerary stelai showed an assortment of mythological scenes, battle scenes, and more, all using the art styles of the Hellenistic period. Stelai in Ancient Greece were used almost in the same manner as modern tombstones, commemorating the dead. They were made of stone or marble, mainly. They often either showed scenes from the deceased's life, or a mythological scene. The use of stelai in Ancient Greece have been observed dating back to the bronze age.

Demetrias was a favorite residence of the kings of Macedon, which is a reason as to why the Hellenistic style was so prevalent in Demetrias.

== Funerary stelai ==
=== Aphrodeisia, Daughter of Theudotos ===
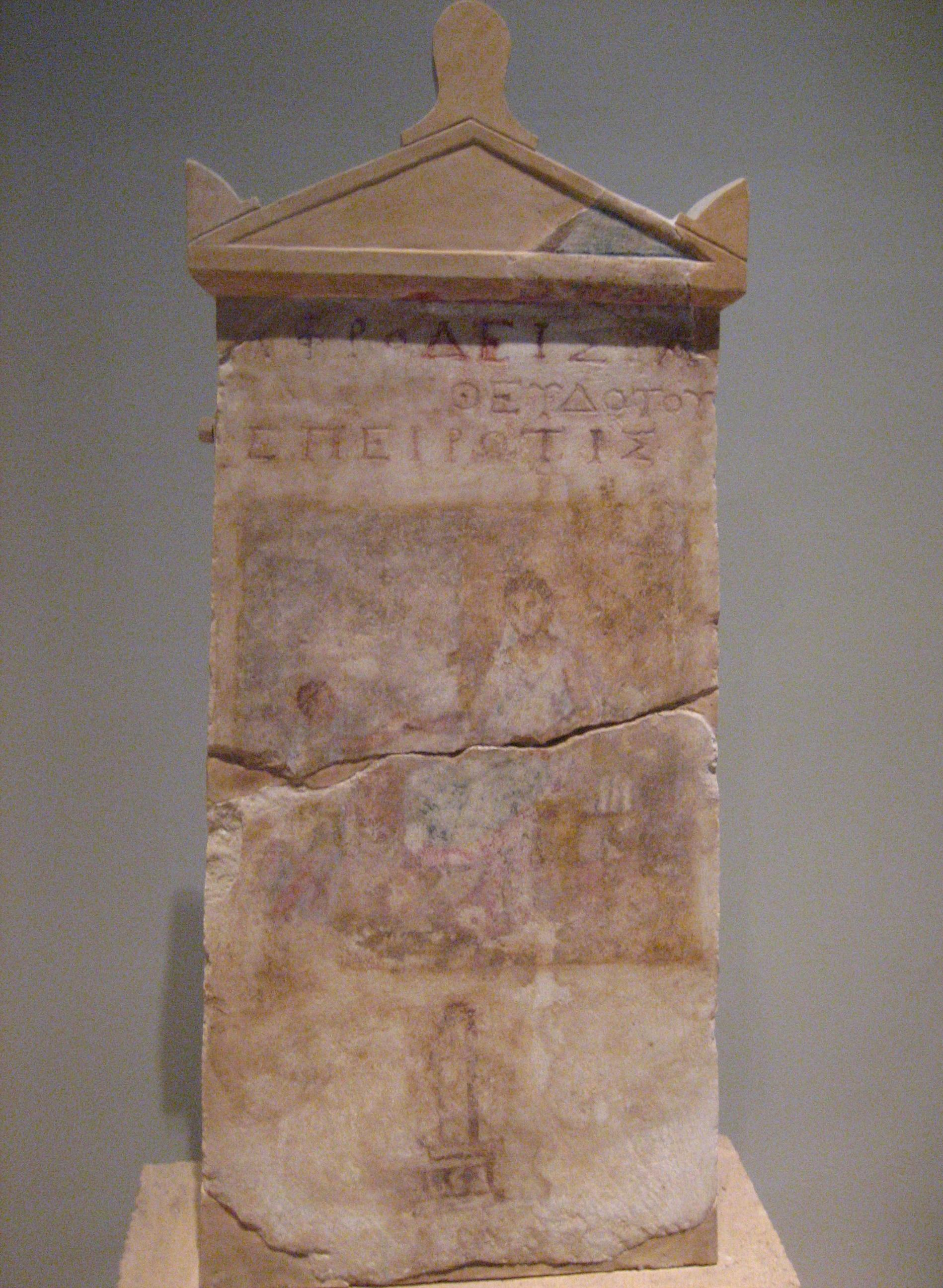
A painted stele depicting Aphrodeisia, daughter of Theudotos.

This Stele was discovered in Magnesia and is determined to date back to 276-168 BCE. It is made of marble, and is meant as a memorial to Aphrodeisia. The top of the stele is an inscription informing the reader that the painting below is of Aphrodeisia. Aphrodeisia is wearing a blue/green chiton and sitting on a chair, being offered jewelry, which she is accepting. It is not clear the context of the situation, but she may be at her wedding due to the dress.

It is currently on display in Vólos, Thessaly, Greece.

=== Stele of the "Warriors" ===
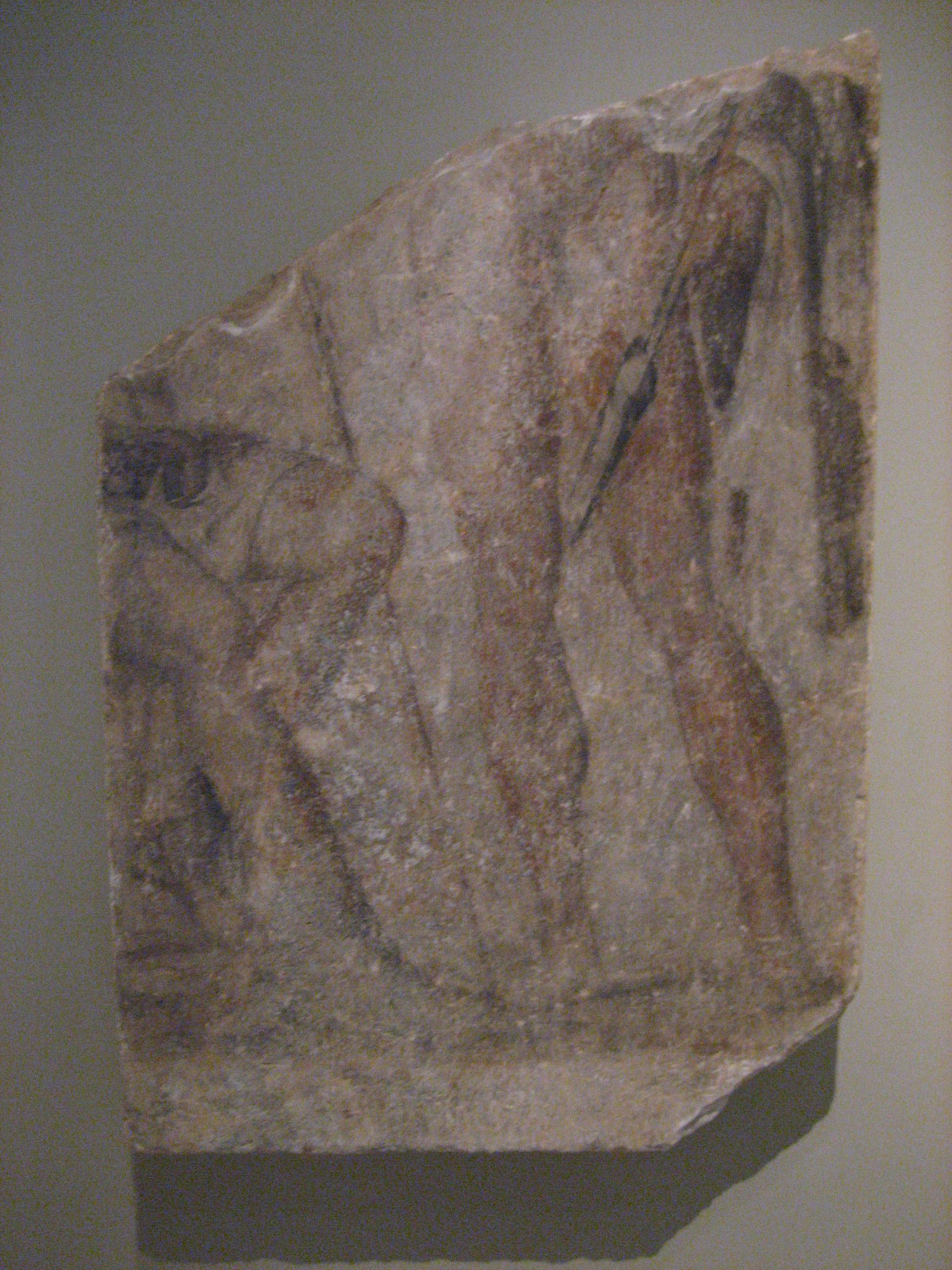
Stele of the Warriors

This partial stele is not in as good condition as the Aphrodeisia stele, but it still provides detail about hellenistic culture and what funerary stelai could have represented. The white marble stele, discovered in Magnesia, shows two men, most likely soldiers. They are thought to be soldiers because of the clothing of the sitting man, which is brought up above his knees, and the spears the men are carrying. It is impossible to determine who these warriors are, as their entire top halves are missing. The standing man is nude, and is also carrying a dagger.
