= Greek hero cult =

Devotion to a hero in ancient Greek religion

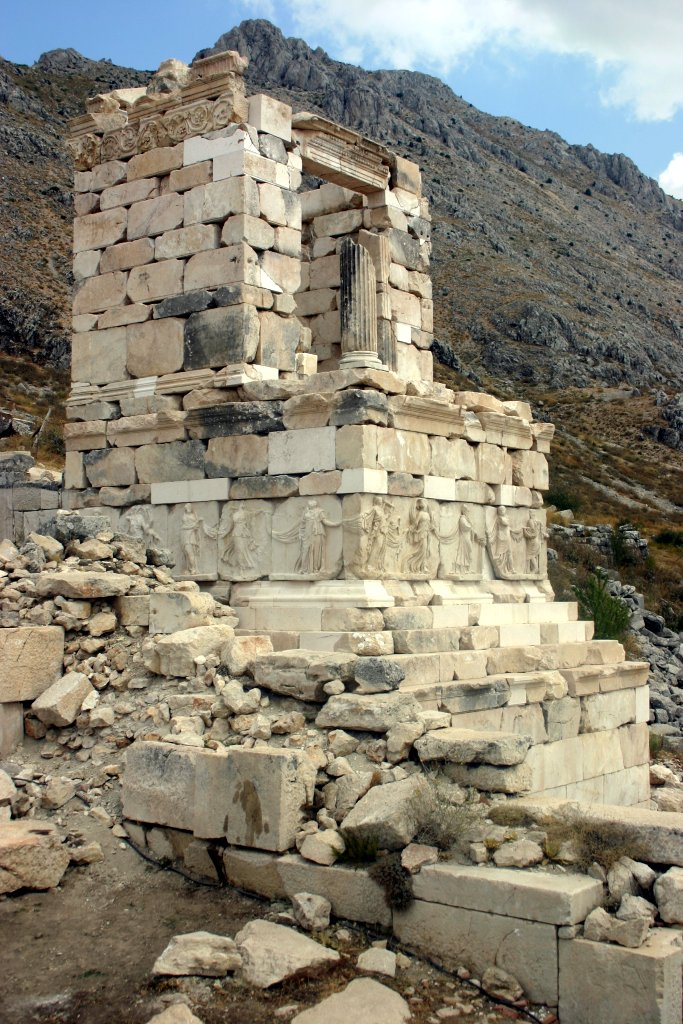
Ruins of a heroön (hero-shrine) at Sagalassos, Turkey.

Hero cults were one of the most distinctive features of ancient Greek religion. In Homeric Greek, "hero" (ἥρως, hḗrōs) refers to the mortal offspring of a human and a god. In Greek religion, a hero held a specific designation as a legendary deceased mortal whose memory is honored with ritual worship at a heroön or shrine—typically centered at the hero's burial site—and who, while extraordinarily gifted in his lifetime, was not immortal or as all-powerful as a deity. Over time, this "hero" category expanded to include minor supernatural figures, thus blurring the boundary between hero and god, as demonstrated by Heracles.

Scholarship on Greek hero cults relies on often conflicting literary and archaeological sources. Both record types agree on three key aspects of hero worship: that hero shrines (heroa) are rare and unevenly distributed across Greece, with most regions utilizing non-specific sites to adapt figures to local civic needs; that Greek polities leveraged hero cults for state propaganda, with Sparta notably promoting specific shrines to shape public sentiment and reinforce territorial claims; and that because Greek religion viewed heroes as earthbound (chthonic) entities, worshippers treated them with cautious reverence, fearing that neglected spirits could inflict disease or misfortune.

Hero cults primarily honored men. In practice, however, devotees usually paid respects to an entire family group. This included female relatives associated with the hero, such as his wife, mother, or daughters.

== Origins and nature of hero cult ==
Scholars situate the origins of the hero cult in the Greek Dark Ages (c. 1180–800 BC), a period of Ancient Greek history which followed the wider Late Bronze Age collapse that affected much of the Eastern Mediterranean. In Greece, the Mycenaean civilization collapsed as palaces and cities were destroyed or abandoned.

In the 10th century BC, pre-literate Greeks of the Dark Ages likely invented a vanished "Age of Heroes" to interpret Bronze Age ruins and tumuli (burial mounds) and familial practices associated with these sites, presumably a form of ancestor worship. Dark age Greeks began to invent stories "to individuate the persons" whom they "believed to be buried in these old and imposing sites," according to Robin Lane Fox.

With the emergence of the polis in the Archaic Age which followed the Dark Ages, populations began imitating their ancestors' ritual practices by making organized votive offerings at sites such as Lefkandi. But lacking historical records or remembered names for the specific individuals buried at these sites, these Greeks incorporated their historical memory into an oral tradition about the dead heroes that later produced epic poetry including the Iliad and the Odyssey.

Greek hero cults were distinct from the clan-based ancestor worship from which they developed. As the polis evolved, hero cults became civic rather than familial affairs, and in many cases none of the worshipers traced their descent back to the hero. While the ancestor was purely local, the hero might be tended to in more than one locality. According to Lewis Richard Farnell, "The hero cult was deeply influenced by the epic tradition which suggested many a name to forgotten graves". John Coldstream believed that the popularity of epic poetry could explain the presence of votive offerings in Dorian regions, where an alien, immigrant population might otherwise be expected to show little reverence for their Mycenaean predecessors.

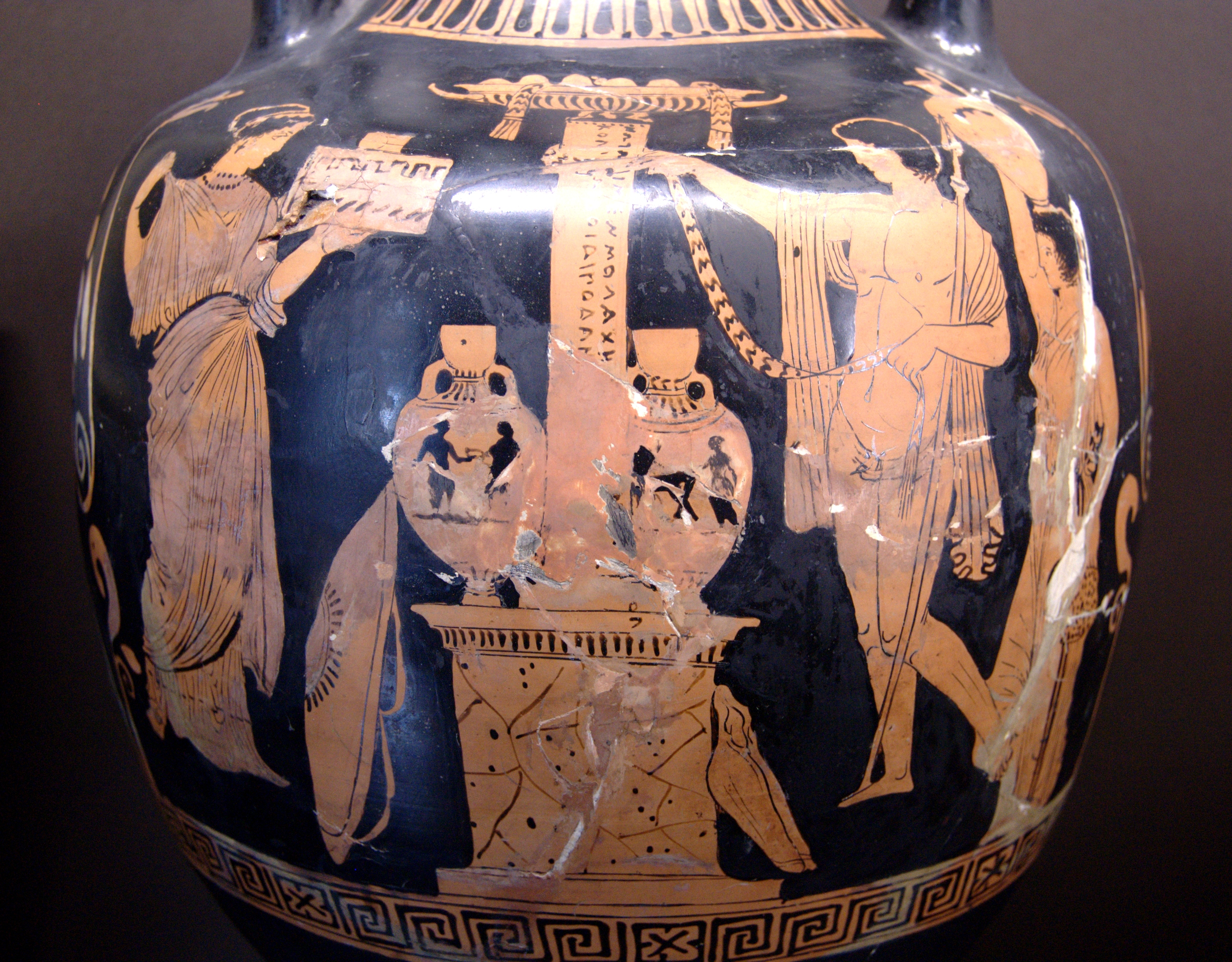
Cult of Oedipus on a Lucanian amphora, ca. 380–70 BC (Louvre, CA 308)

Aside from the epic tradition, which featured the heroes alive and in action rather than as objects of cultus, the earliest written reference to hero-cult is attributed to Dracon, the Athenian lawgiver of the late seventh century BC, who prescribed that gods and local heroes should both be honoured according to ancestral custom. The custom, then, was already established, and there were multiple local heroes. The written sources emphasise the importance of heroes' tombs and the temenos or sanctuary, where chthonic rites appeased their spirits and induced them to continue to favour the people who looked to them as founders, of whom founding myths were related. In the hero's restricted and local scope he "retained the limited and partisan interests of his mortal life. He would help those who lived in the vicinity of his tomb or who belonged to the tribe of which he himself was the founder," observes Robert Parker. James Whitley interprets the co-opting of hero cults by the city-state as a strategic political gesture. As evidence, he points to the monumental 490 BC Marathon tumuli, where Athens interred its cremated citizen-heroes who died in the Battle of Marathon. Offering trenches surrounding the mound indicate that these fallen soldiers were honored with traditional chthonic rites.

== Types of hero cult ==
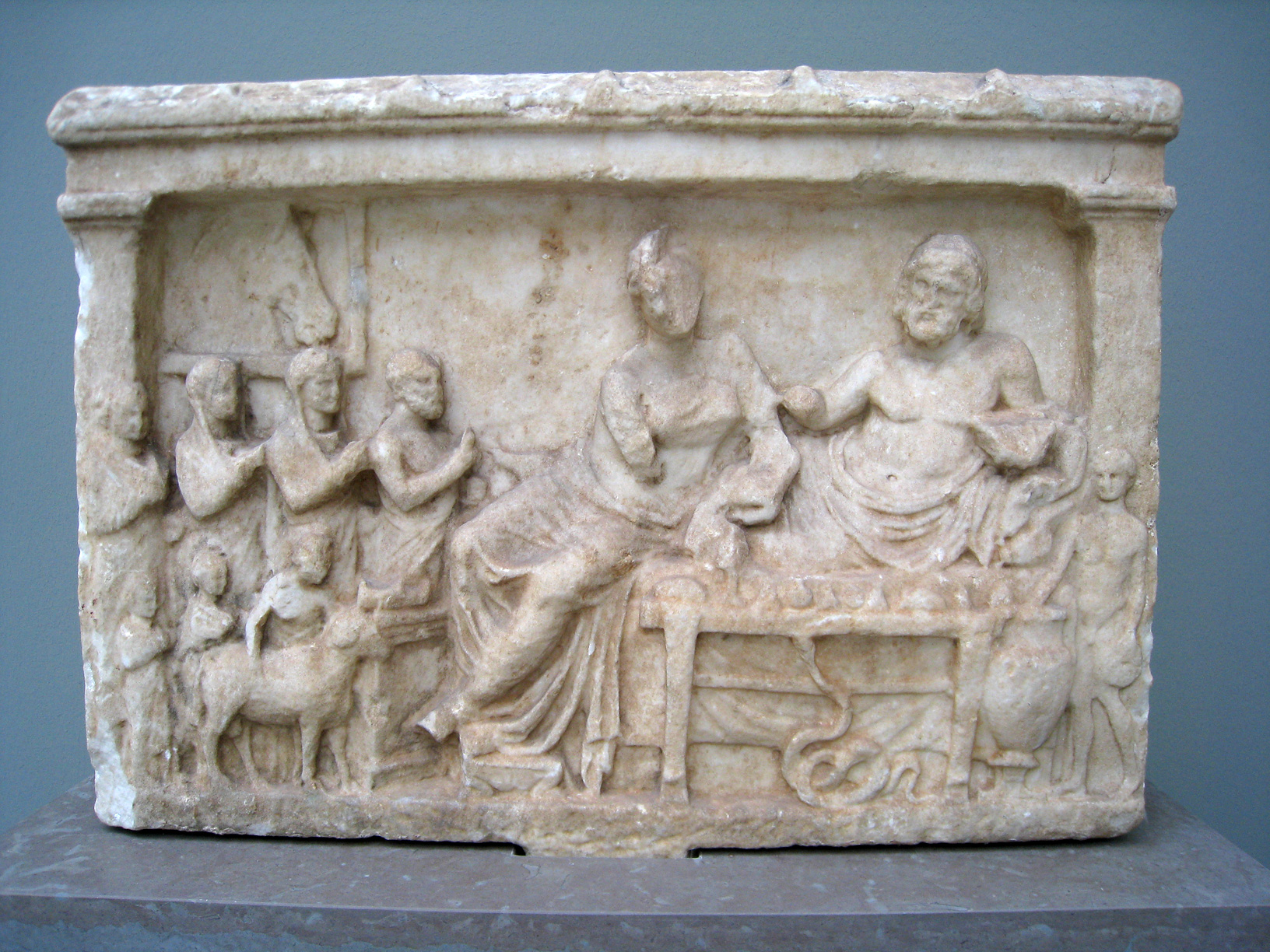
Offerings to a deified hero and another deity, depicted on a Greek marble relief ca. 300 BC

Archaeologist James Whitley distinguishes four types of hero cult:

=== Oikist cults of founders ===
Such cults arose in colonies in the Hellenic world in Magna Graecia and Sicily at the grave of the founder, the oikist (from oikos, "family unit"). In the case of cults at the tombs of the recently heroised, it must be assumed that the identity of the occupant of the tomb was unequivocally known. Thucydides (V.11.1) gives the example of Brasidas at Amphipolis. Battus of Cyrene might also be mentioned. "Such historical examples," Whitley notes, "have clearly colored the interpretation of certain tomb cults in the Archaic period [c. 800 to 480 BC]." Such Archaic sites as the heroön at Lefkandi and that close to the West Gate at Eretria cannot be distinguished by archaeological methods from family observances at tombs (tomb cults) and the cult of ancestors.

=== Cults to named heroes ===
A number of cult sites known in Classical times (510 to 323 BC) were dedicated to known heroes, especially of the Iliad and other episodes of the Epic Cycle. Whitley notes that figures such as Odysseus, Agamemnon and Menelaus also all have strong local connections. The cults of Oedipus at Athens and Pelops at Olympia are examples.

=== Cults to local heroes ===
Such local figures do not figure among the Panhellenic figures of epic. Examples are Akademos and Erechtheus at Athens.

=== Cults at Bronze Age tombs ===
These are represented archaeologically by Iron Age deposits in Mycenaean tombs, not easily interpreted because of the gap in time between the Bronze Age collapse and the appearance of the earliest votive objects. A sherd from above the Grave Circle A at Mycenae is simply inscribed "to the hero", and Whitley suggests that an unnamed race of the Silver Age might have been invoked. In Attica, such cults are those associated with tholos tombs at Thorikos and Menidhi.

== Women and the hero cult ==
Hero cults were offered most prominently to men, though in practice the experience of the votary was of propitiating a cluster of family figures which included wives, mothers, and daughters of a hero. In Moses Finley's observation of the world of Odysseus, which he reads as a nostalgic eighth-century rendering of Dark Age Greece, "Penelope became a moral heroine for later generations, the embodiment of goodness and chastity, to be contrasted with the faithless, murdering Clytemnestra, Agamemnon's wife; but 'hero' has no feminine gender in the age of heroes."

Where local cults venerated figures like the sacrificial virgin Iphigenia, an archaic local nymph was transformed into a mortal figure of legend. Other isolated women served as priestess-initiators for local cults. While iconographic and epigraphic evidence depicts heroines as fundamentally similar to heroes, heroines were typically relegated to lesser stature within patriarchal Greek culture.

Whitley notes that the earliest heroa associate the male hero with earlier and stronger female presences.

== See also ==
- Bodhisattva
- Chinese hero cult
- Culture hero
- Deification
- Demigod
- Dharmapala
- Imperial cult of ancient Rome
- Kami
- Shen (Chinese religion)
- Thracian religion
- Vrishni heroes

== Sources ==
- Antonaccio, Carla M. (July 1994). "Contesting the Past: Hero Cult, Tomb Cult, and Epic in Early Greece". American Journal of Archaeology. 98 (3): 389–410. doi:10.2307/506436. ISSN 0002-9114. JSTOR 506436. S2CID 192969382.
- Antonaccio, Carla M. (1995). An Archaeology of Ancestors: Tomb Cult and Hero Cult in Early Greece. Lanham, MD: Rowman & Littlefield. ISBN 978-0-8476-7941-6.
- Antonaccio, Carla M. (1995). "Lefkandi and Homer". In Andersen, Øivind; Dickie, Matthew (eds.). Homer's World: Fiction, Tradition and Reality. Papers from the Norwegian Institute at Athens. Vol. 3. Bergen: Norwegian Institute at Athens. ISBN 978-82-991411-9-2.
- Coldstream, J. N. (1976). "Hero-Cults in the Age of Homer". The Journal of Hellenic Studies. 96: 8–17. doi:10.2307/631221. JSTOR 631221.
- Farnell, Lewis R. (1921). Greek Hero-Cults and Ideas of Immortality. Oxford: Clarendon Press.
- Finley, M. I. (1978) [1954]. The World of Odysseus (revised ed.). New York: Viking Press. pp. 32ff.
- Hack, R. K. (1929). "Homer and the Cult of Heroes". Transactions and Proceedings of the American Philological Association. 60: 57–74. doi:10.2307/282883. JSTOR 282883.
- Kearns, Emily (1989). The Heroes of Attica. Bulletin of the Institute of Classical Studies Supplement. Vol. 57. London: Institute of Classical Studies, University of London. ISBN 978-0-900587-54-2..
- Larson, Jennifer (1995). Greek Heroine Cults. Madison: University of Wisconsin Press. ISBN 978-0-299-14370-1.
- Malkin, Irad (1987). Religion and Colonization in Ancient Greece. Leiden: Brill. pp. 189–266. ISBN 978-90-04-07119-3.
- Morris, Ian (1988). "Tomb cult and the "Greek Renaissance": the past in the present in the 8th century BC". Antiquity. 62 (237): 750–761. doi:10.1017/S0003598X00075217 (inactive 16 November 2026).
- Parker, Robert (2001). "Greek Religion". In Boardman, John; Griffin, Jasper; Murray, Oswyn (eds.). The Oxford History of Greece and the Hellenistic World. Oxford: Oxford University Press. ISBN 9780191500626.
- Rohde, Erwin (1925). Psyche: The Cult of Souls and Belief in Immortality among the Greeks. London: Kegan Paul, Trench, Trubner & Co.
- Schliemann, Heinrich (1878). Mycenae: A Narrative of Researches and Discoveries at Mycenae and Tiryns. London: John Murray.
- Whitley, James (April 1994). "The Monuments That Stood before Marathon: Tomb Cult and Hero Cult in Archaic Attica". American Journal of Archaeology. 98 (2): 213–230. doi:10.2307/506636. JSTOR 506636. S2CID 190728749.
