= Heroön =

Ancient Greco-Roman shrine dedicated to a hero

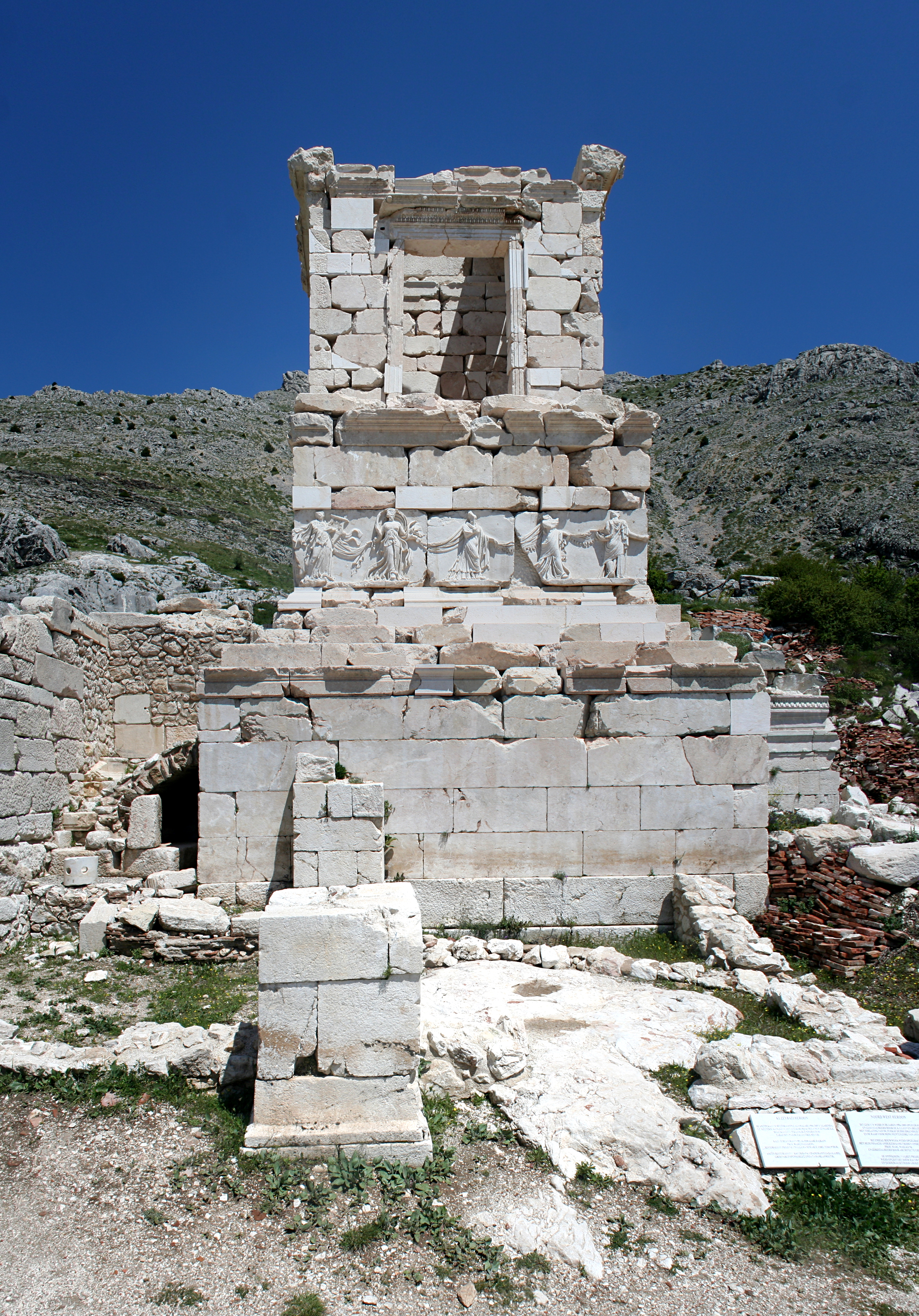
The northwest heroön at Sagalassos, Turkey

A heroön or heroon (plural heroa) (/hɪˈroʊ.ɒn/; Ancient Greek: ἡρῷον, romanized: hērôion, pl. ἡρῷα, hērôia), also Latinized as heroum, was, in the ancient Greco-Roman world, a shrine dedicated to a hero and used in the practice of hero cult ritual. A heroön was often built over what was traditionally identified as a hero's tomb or cenotaph. Heroa were erected from the time of archaic Greece to the Augustan Roman period, from the 9th century BC to the first century AD. The practice was widespread in the ancient world; ruins of heroa have been found in Ai-Khanoum in Afghanistan.

== Heroa in cult practice ==
Hero cults were a defining feature of ancient Greek religion. A hero was a legendary mortal figure whose name was to be honored through ritual worship at a shrine—heroön—typically built over the hero's traditional burial site. The heroön was believed to contain the hero's relic bones. Cultists believed that honoring a hero at these sites—either privately by leaving votive offerings or publicly with ceremonial athletic games and feasts—allowed them to access a hero's lingering local power.

These public ceremonies played a central role in the life of a polis, giving the city a shared focus for its identity. Tradition held that Cimon of Athens avenged the death of the legendary hero Theseus in 469 BC by locating the hero's bones and bringing them to Athens. In his Histories, Herodotus recounts that a band of Spartans raided the shrine at Tegea and stole the bones of Orestes from his heroön there. By capturing Orestes's remains, the Spartans bound the hero's protective power to their polis and so assured their victory over Tegea, thus fulfilling a prophecy of the Oracle of Delphi. (For an analogous practice in ancient Rome, see evocatio).

== Heroa around the Greco-Roman world ==
Spread across the Mediterranean, heroa appear near Mycenaean tholos tombs and within civic sanctuaries. In Italy, notable examples include the Tomb of Theron in Agrigento, Sicily and a shrine in Paestum that yielded large metal vases.

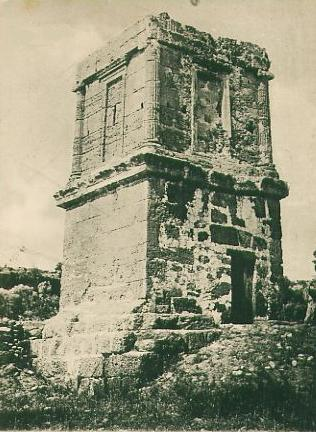
The Tomb of Theron, a heroön at Agrigento, Sicily.

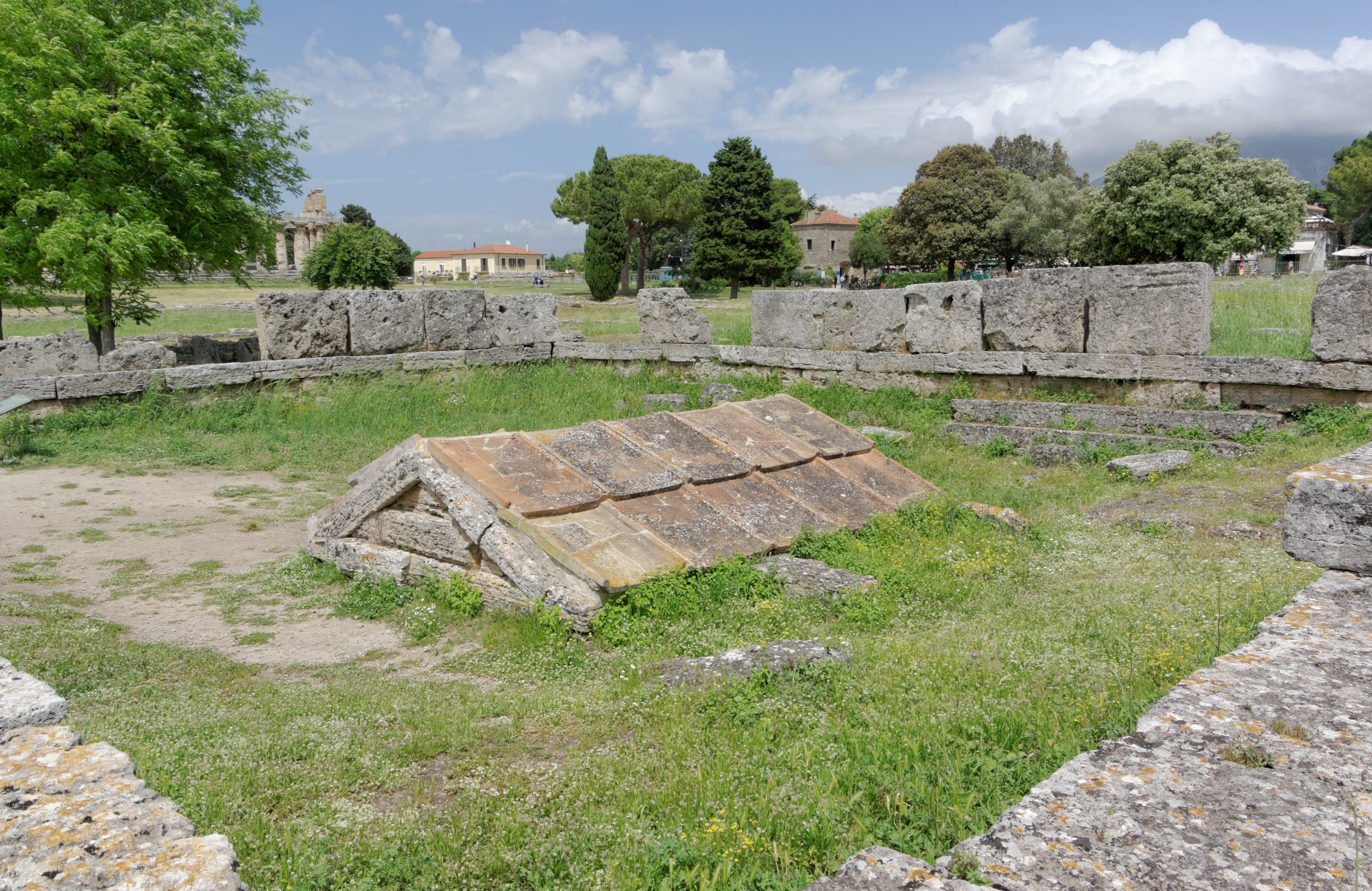
Heroön at Paestum, uncovered in 1952

in Greek Macedonia, a heroön at Vergina likely honored the family of Alexander the Great and may have housed a cult statue of Philip II. Within mainland Greece, the Heroön at Nemea in the sanctuary of Zeus honored the infant hero Opheltes.

The heroa tradition extended into the Roman era; many can be found in modern Turkey. An Augustan-period heroön stands in Sagalassos, while Ephesus houses the Library of Celsus, a shrine to Tiberius Julius Celsus Polemaeanus.

== History ==
=== Bronze Age and Archaic Greece ===
The earliest heroa in Greece appeared during the Mycenaean era (c. 1750 – 1050 BCE) of the Late Bronze Age. Builders constructed these sites using typical tombs of the era: either subterranean shaft graves filled with lavish grave goods or stone-walled tholos (beehive) chamber tombs.

An unlooted shaft tomb at Pylos dated to c. 1450 BCE was dedicated to the "Griffin Warrior". It contained a rich assemblage of goods including a large bronze sword, gold rings, jewels, and finely carved seals. The mixed Mycenaean and Minoan styles of these artifacts indicates extensive cultural interaction across the Bronze Age Aegean up until the Late Bronze Age collapse.

The tradition of monumental hero tombs persisted through the Greek Dark Ages (c. 1200 – c. 800 BCE) and the Archaic period (c. 800 – c. 500 BCE), as demonstrated by the tenth-century BCE heroön at Lefkandi in Euboea. This massive apsidal structure was fifty meters long. Inside, archaeologists discovered two sets of cremated remains in bronze amphoras. The primary burial was identified as that of the hero himself by an engraved hunting scene on the urn and a stash of iron swords left as votives. His remains lay alongside the remains of a woman, possibly his wife, who may have been ritually sacrificed to join him in death.

=== Classical Greece ===
The practice of adapting tholos architecture for heroa endured into the Classical period (510—323 BCE), as exemplified by a mid-fifth century BCE shrine at Olympia. It has a circular chamber set within a square outer frame, enclosing a large earthen mound which contains a hero's relics. The shrine's placement at a Panhellenic sanctuary rather than inside the polis suggests that it honored a figure of widespread renown. Its design is a departure from earlier heroa at Lefkandi and Acragas.

Heroa were equally common throughout the Greek colonies, as shown by the first-century BCE shrine at Acragas on the southern coast of Sicily. This structure, traditionally called the Oratory of Phalaris, is a hybrid of Classical orders. The shrine survived beyond antiquity, eventually serving as a Christian church.
