= History of physical training and fitness =

Historical physical training methods

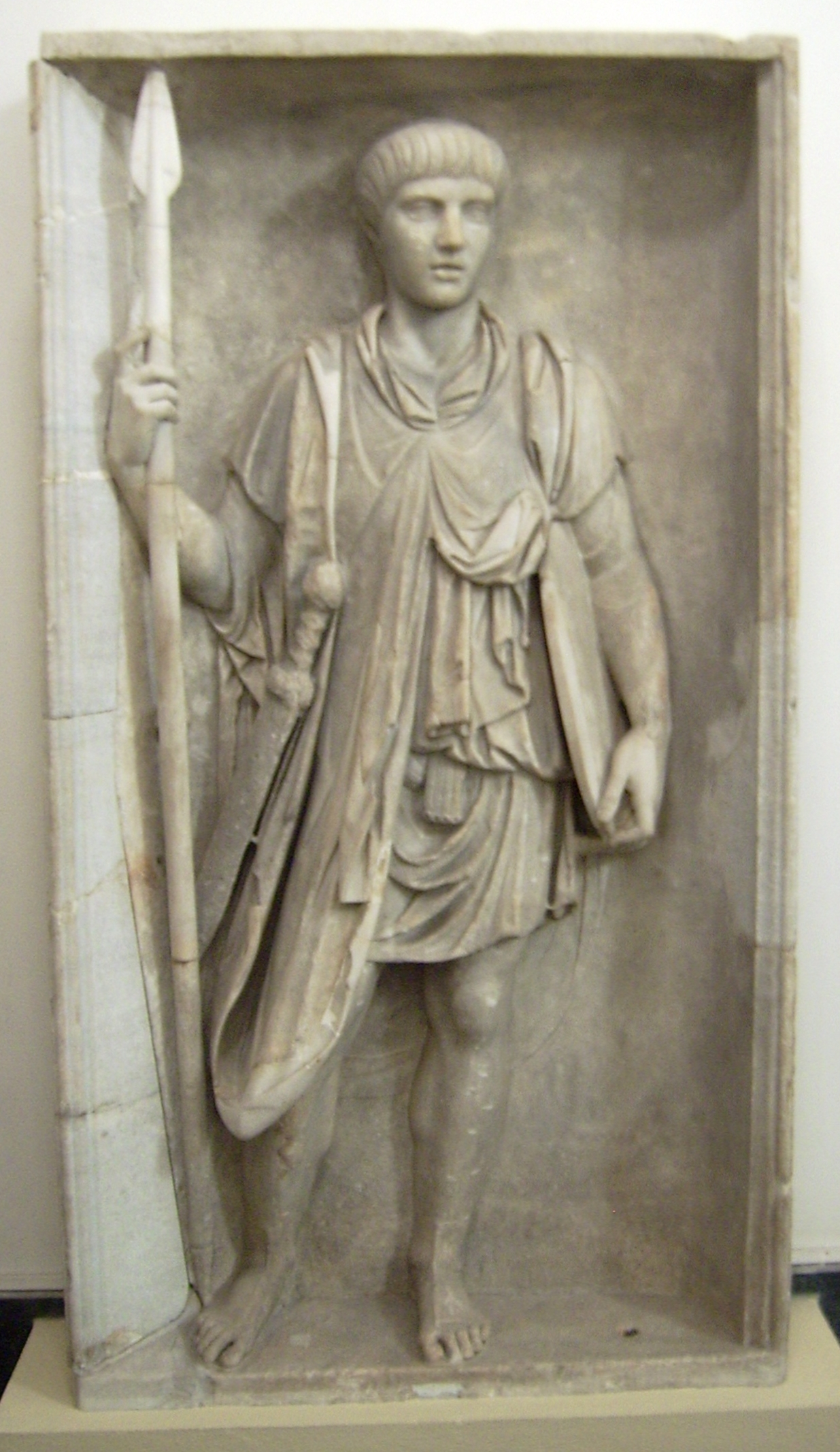
Ancient Roman relief showing a legionary. Antikensammlung, 2nd century AD

Physical training has been present in some human societies throughout history. Usually, people trained to prepare for physical competition or display, to improve physical, emotional and mental health, and to look attractive. The activity took a variety of different forms but quick dynamic exercises were favoured over slow or more static ones. For example, running, jumping, wrestling, gymnastics and throwing heavy stones are mentioned frequently in historical sources and emphasised as being highly effective training-methods. Notably, they are also forms of exercise which are readily achievable for most people to some extent or another.

Athletes of Ancient Greece widely practiced physical training. However, after the original Olympic Games were banned by the Romans in 394, such culturally significant athletic competitions were not held again until the 19th Century. In 1896 the Olympic Games revived after a gap of some 1,500 years. In the years in between, formalised systems of physical training had become more closely aligned with military training. Whilst there were differences in how the training manifested itself based upon its purpose, there were also obvious similarities, and some similar training methods and focuses recur through European history.

== Methods by era and region ==
=== Ancient Greece ===
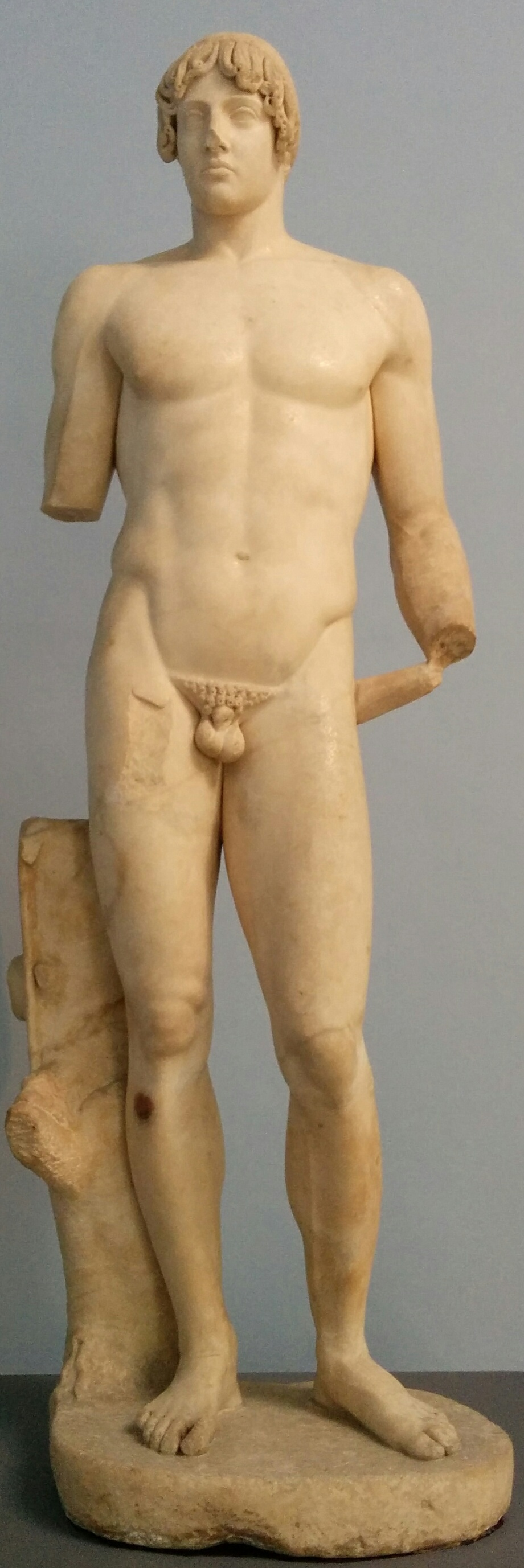
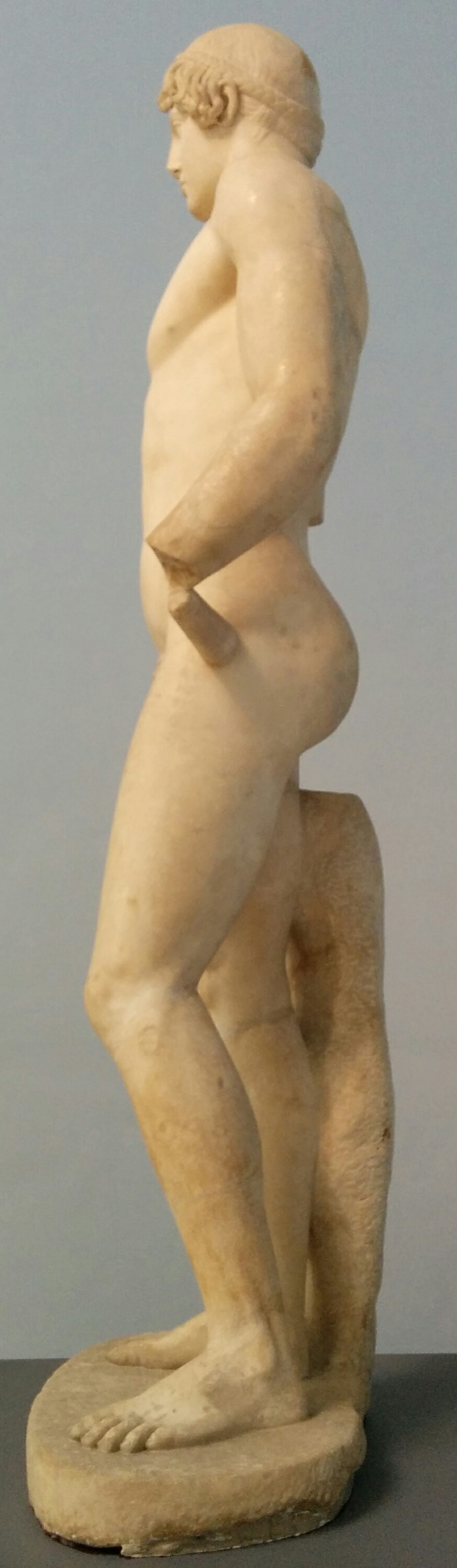
The well developed torso and large gluteal muscles of this boxer demonstrate a physique which was a standard result of historical physical training methods. British Museum, c. 460.

Ballistic training

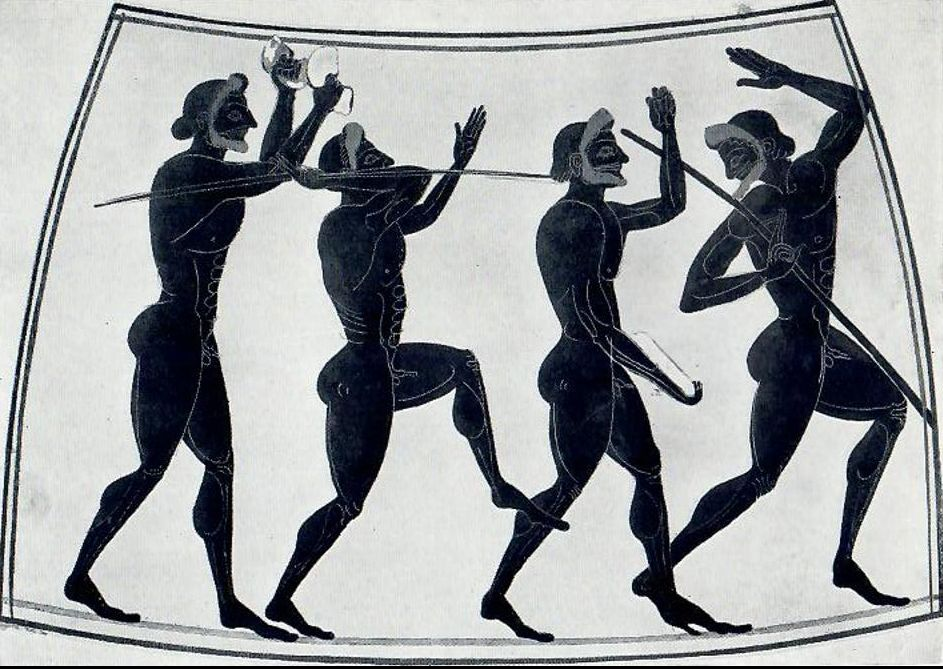
A scene depicting javelin throwers, a discus thrower, and a long jumper. This drawing is an early 20th Century copy of a scene found on a Panathenaic amphora from Ancient Greece. British Museum, c. 525 BC.

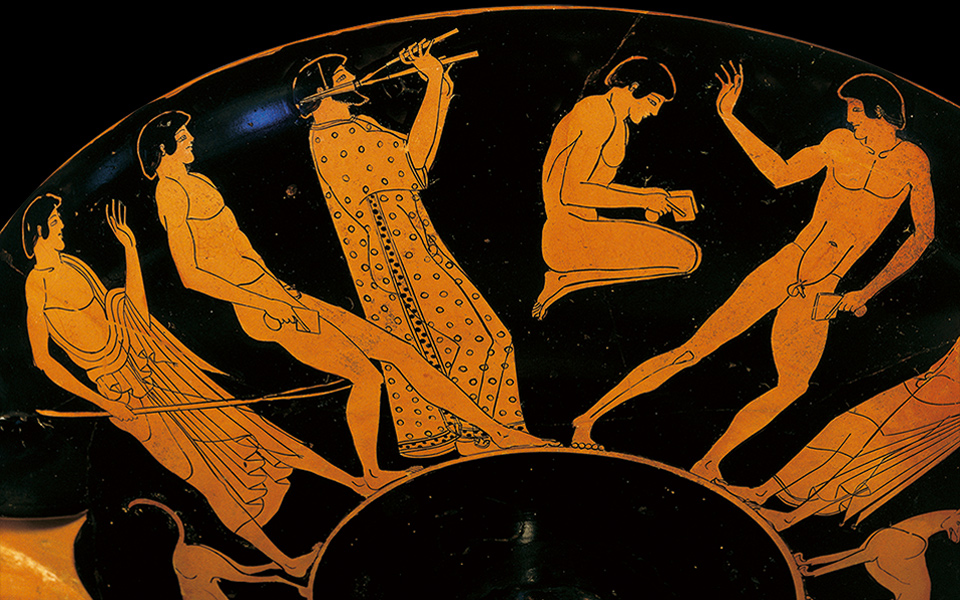
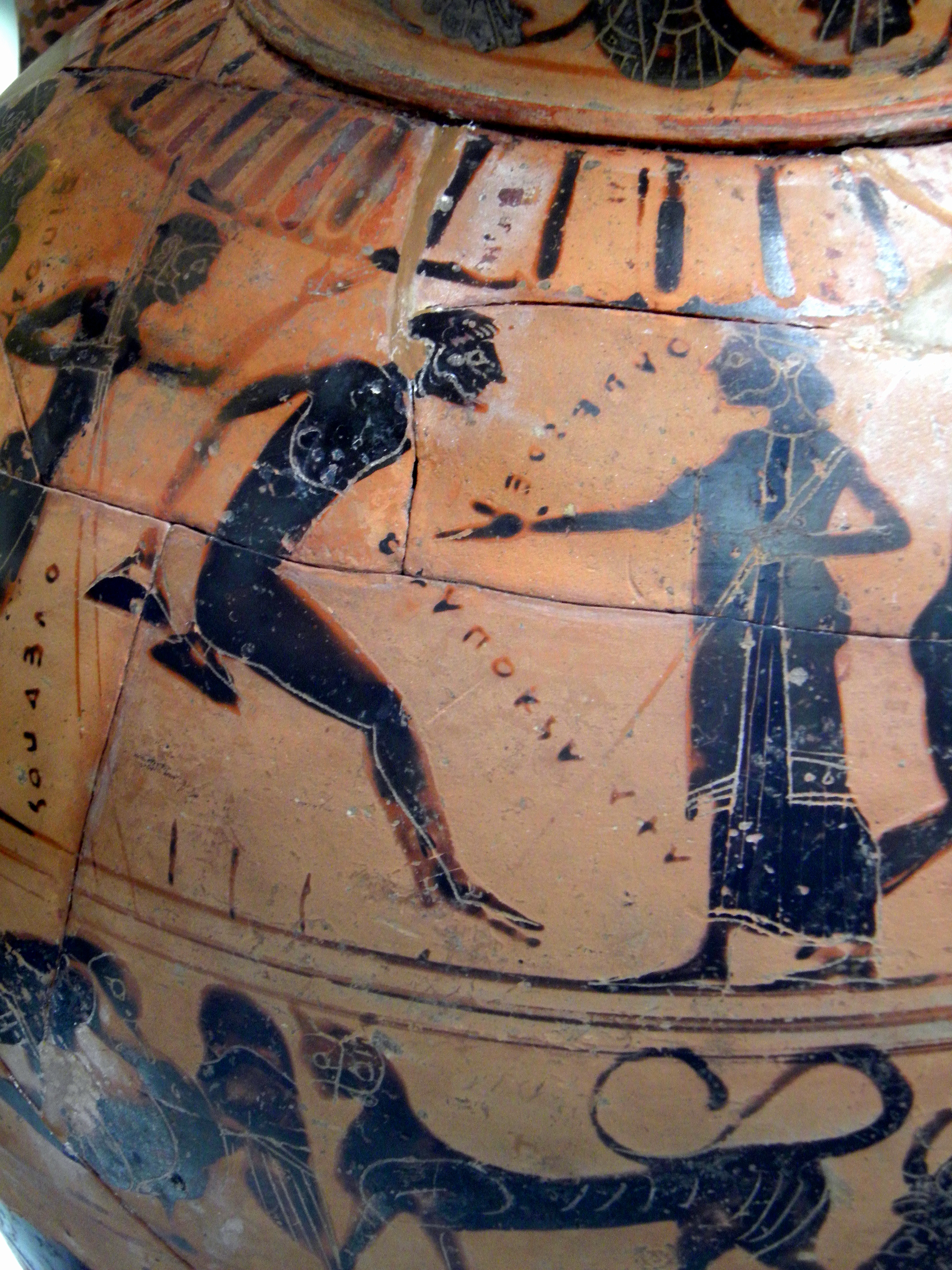
A long jump from standing. The weights would be swung up and down before taking off on an upswing.

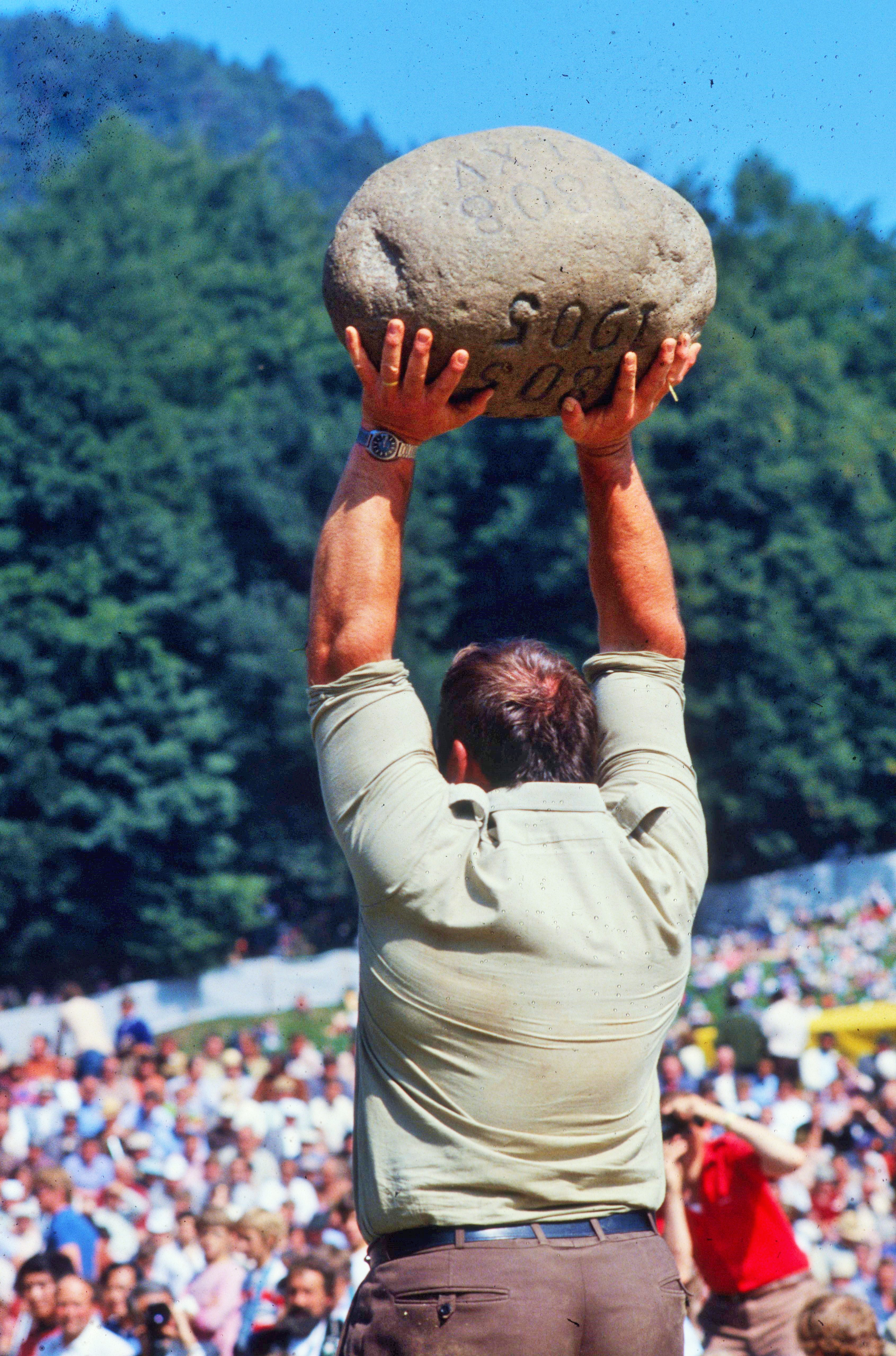
The throw of this 76kg stone represents the continuity of a ballistic training tradition which dates from Ancient Greece. Unspunnenfest, 1981.

- Throwing a heavy stone (a stone put). Smaller stones were thrown one handed from the shoulder. The heaviest record of a stone throw from the period is Bybon's stone which was found at Olympia, Greece. It is 316 lbs (143.5 kg), has a handle, and an inscription which states it was thrown over the head one handed by Bybon. The technique for the throw would be similar to the 'bag over bar' modern strongman event. Military accounts detail heavy stones being thrown as a form of projectile weapon, with even gates being broken open in this manner. This suggests the stones were of significant weight and that warriors trained in this regard in order to be able to perform the feat successfully.
- Throwing a discus. Metal discuses weighed between 3-12 1/2 lbs, and stone discuses up to 15 lbs.
- Throwing a javelin.
- Throwing a tree trunk.

Plyometrics

- Long jumps from standing with specially shaped jumping weights, called halteres, held in the hands. For a jump from standing, one foot is positioned forward and one foot back. The weights are swung up and down until the jumper jumps in conjunction with an upswing. The long jump could also be performed without weights, and with a running start.
- Vertical jumps as high as possible. Some descriptions state the legs are kicked out behind during the jump. This may refer to the natural movement of the legs which occurs during a powerful upwards jump. Amphorae show a vertical jump with the jumpers looking sideways, which also precipitates a movement of the bent, lower legs in this direction.
- Jumping up and down and alternately extending the legs forwards and backwards.
- Jumping (meant generally)
- Jumping whilst wearing armour.
- Vaulting onto horseback with a pole (pole vaulting)

Calisthenics

- Drill type exercises such as may be found on a modern parade ground.
- Running. Different varieties of running were practiced such as running whilst carrying halteres, in armour, in heavy sand, incorporating jumps along the way (hurdling), running whilst turning a large ring (hula hoop) along the ground by their side with a stick, and running whilst carrying a large metal tripod, running in a decreasing or increasing circle, whilst holding a torch
- Marching on the forefeet while swinging the arms
- Gymnastics including acrobatics, tumbling, and rhythmic dance.
- Dancing. Various dances were performed, including the Pyrrhic dance which was a war dance that imitated battlefield actions of attack and defence. It involved quick dynamic actions such as bending to one side, crouching down, leaping up etc.
- Swimming and diving
- Driving a chariot
- Rope climbing
- Empty handed dumbbell movements with the hands open or clenched.

Co-operative calisthenics

- Holding the arms extended while another person tries to push them down.

Strength and weight training

- Stone lifting. A 480 kg stone found at Santorin is inscribed with the statement 'Eumastas, the son of Critobulus, lifted me from the ground.'
- Carrying a heavy weight
- Rowing
- Digging. This was for two reasons. Firstly, the sand in the gymnasium was dug over daily with a pick before being rolled flat again. Secondly, digging was performed as an exercise in its own right and was especially popular with boxers.
- Using halteres as dumbbells in a rapid fashion including in swinging motions. Halteres ranged from between 2 1/4 and 10 lbs. Movement ranges mentioned in connection with this exercise include bending and straightening the arms, sideways movements, lunging in the style of a boxer, and bending and straightening the trunk. Another exercise described by the renowned physician Galen, consists of placing the halteres six feet apart and standing between them. The exerciser picks up the left haltere with his right hand, and then the right haltere with his left hand, replaces them, and continues to repeat the sequence.
- The addition of weights or armour to calisthenic exercises.

Games and sports played for fitness

- Greek wrestling was considered fundamentally important to contemporary fitness regimens.
- Pygmachia (Ancient Greek boxing). Boxing exercises included hitting a punch bag and practicing punching actions whilst holding dumbbells.
- Pankration (similar to modern MMA)
- Hockey, the rules are unclear but it involved similar shaped clubs, ball, and bent over playing postures as the modern game.
- Platanistas, a game popular in Sparta. Two teams enter an island over opposite bridges. The island is surrounded by water filled ditches and each team attempts to drive their opponents into the water using a variety of striking and wrestling techniques.
- Ball games. Striking a ball against the ground or wall and hitting it again when it rebounded. Similar to the game of 'fives' in this respect. Amphorae show some ball games were played in a piggy-back style where one person was carried on the back of the other. Exercising with a small ball at any pace and using any desired rules and techniques, solitarily or with others.

Sky ball, a player throws a ball into the air, and he and other players try to catch it.

Epikoinos, a game involving two teams of equal numbers and a ball which was roughly the size of a large apple. The two teams line up in a staggered formation either side of a centre line i.e. player 1 is closest to the line, player 2 midway and player 3 furthest, and the same for the opposite team. The centre line was marked out of gypsum or stone, and called skyros or latype. There was a goal line some distance behind each team. At the set up of the game the ball is placed on the centre line. When the game begins, each team races to secure the ball. Whoever secures the ball then attempts to throw it over and beyond their opponents who attempt to catch it and return it in a similar manner. By following this process, the aim of the game is to force the opposing team back over their goal line.

=== Rome ===
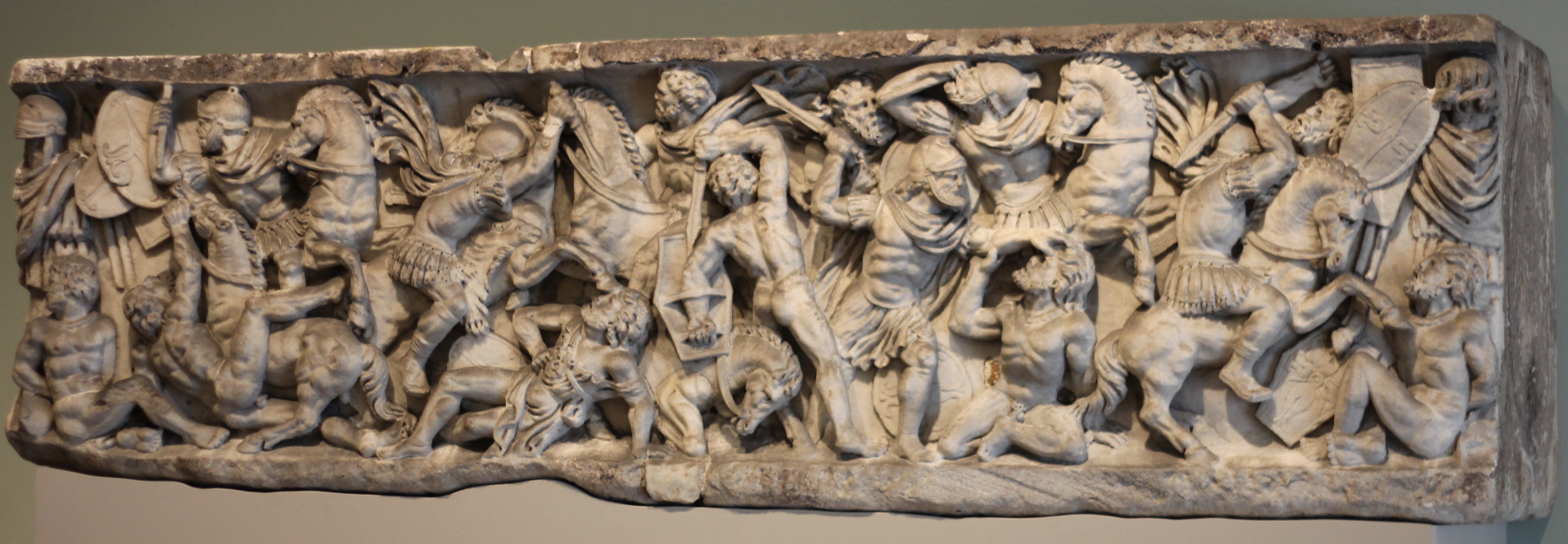
This battle scene found on a Roman sarcophagus demonstrates the excellent physical conditioning of both Roman soldiers and Celtic warriors. Dallas Museum of Art, c. 190 AD.

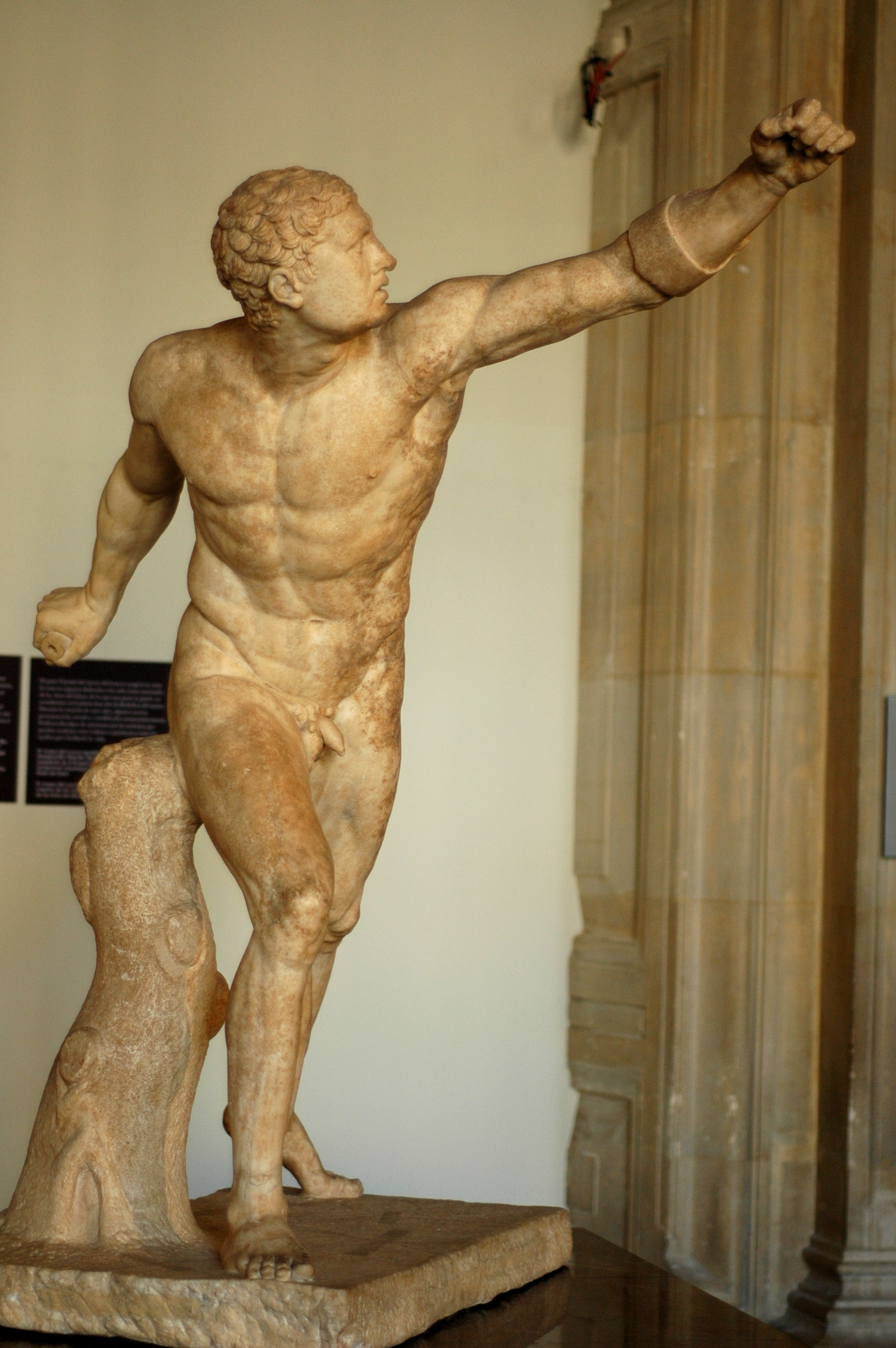
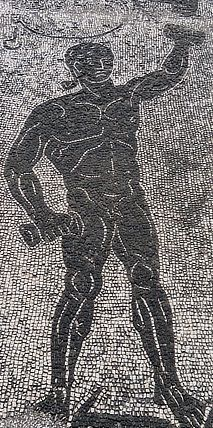
Left: The Borghese Gladiator, c. 100 BC, Louvre. Right: Athlete in a black figure mosaic performing a standing alternating dumbbell snatch exercise, Porta Marina steam baths, Ostia c. 300 AD.
- Throwing the javelin

Plyometrics

- Jumping
- Vaulting

Calisthenics

- Marching 25 km in 5 hours
- Marching 12 km with 20 kg of weight
- Running
- Horse riding including the specific practicing of mounting and dismounting techniques.
- Hunting
- Swimming

Strength and weight training

- Training with weapons which were double the weight of ordinary weapons so when ordinary weapons were used in battle they would feel lighter and easier to control. This may also be considered as a form of contrast loading.
- Military training exercises performed in armour
- Chopping wood
- Dumbbell exercises

Games and sports played for fitness

- Wrestling
- Pygmachia
- Fencing
- Archery
- Slinging
- Dart throwing
- Ball games.

Trigon (trans. Triangle), involved players being positioned at the three points of a triangle and throwing or hitting the ball to each other.

Harpastum, the gameplay is not fully clear but involves players passing to each other in a bid to avoid an opposing player who is attempting to intercept the ball. It also involves feinting to fool the opposition and dodging out of the way. Non-active players would wait to join in the game, perhaps standing around in a circle to demark the playing area. A waiting player could be allowed into the game by an active player.

=== Medieval Europe ===
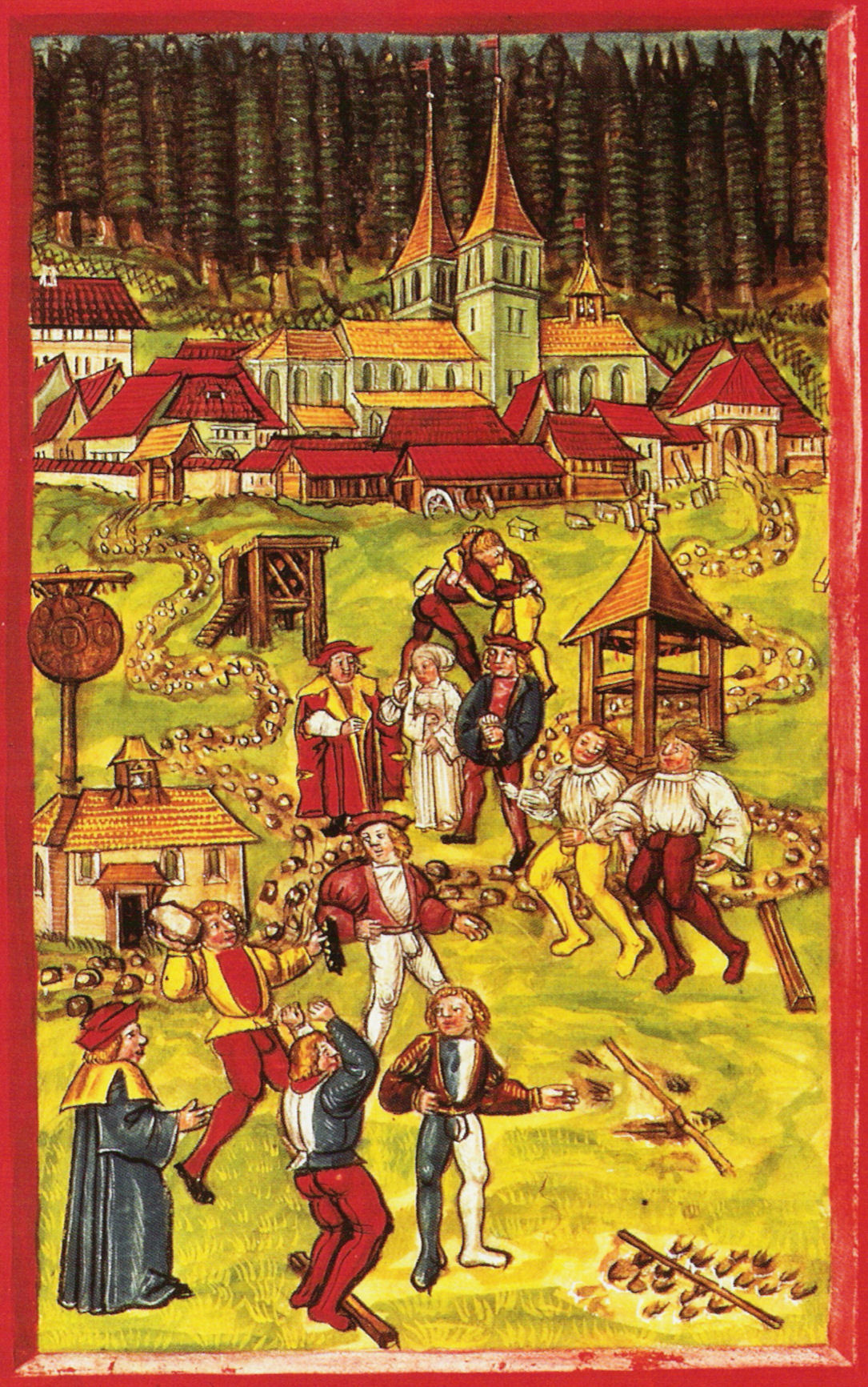
Schilling (Swiss) mercenaries training, including stone putting, wrestling, skipping, and jumping or diving. Lucerne Chronicle, 1513.

Ballistic training

- Throwing the stone. A one-handed throw of a stone from the shoulder is among the more common exercises displayed in medieval artwork. The thrower holds the stone above their shoulder and turns their body sideways on to the desired direction of travel. They shift their bodyweight so it is predominantly over the foot which is the same side as the stone. They then throw the stone as hard as they can which involves a shift of the bodyweight to the other foot. Throwing heavy stones is also an exercise, a knightly pursuit, recommended by the fencing master Hans Talhoffer.

Plyometrics

- Jumping
- Skipping along (without a rope)

Calisthenics

- Climbing. Climbing up the inside of a narrow tower, or between two walls, using pressure from the hands and feet, or other parts of their body. Climbing up the corner of two perpendicular walls using pressure from the arms and legs.
- Climbing up the underside of a ladder.
- Dancing vigorously, including in armour.
- Marching carrying weight, including uphill.
- Gymnastics including acrobatics and tumbling. Knights would perform somersaults in full plate armour but without the helmet.
- Vaulting, especially onto or over a horse or wooden horse.
- Long marches carrying weight uphill.
- Horse riding including practicing turning on horseback
- Wall running i.e. running up a wall and grabbing the top edge. Similar to what is practiced in modern parkour.
- Running and jumping.
- Gymnastics including bridges and handstands.
- Hunting
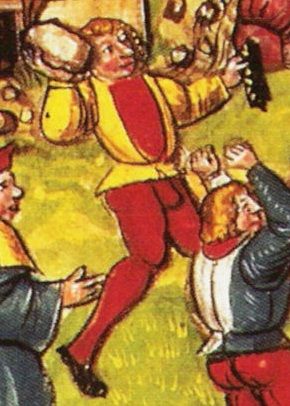
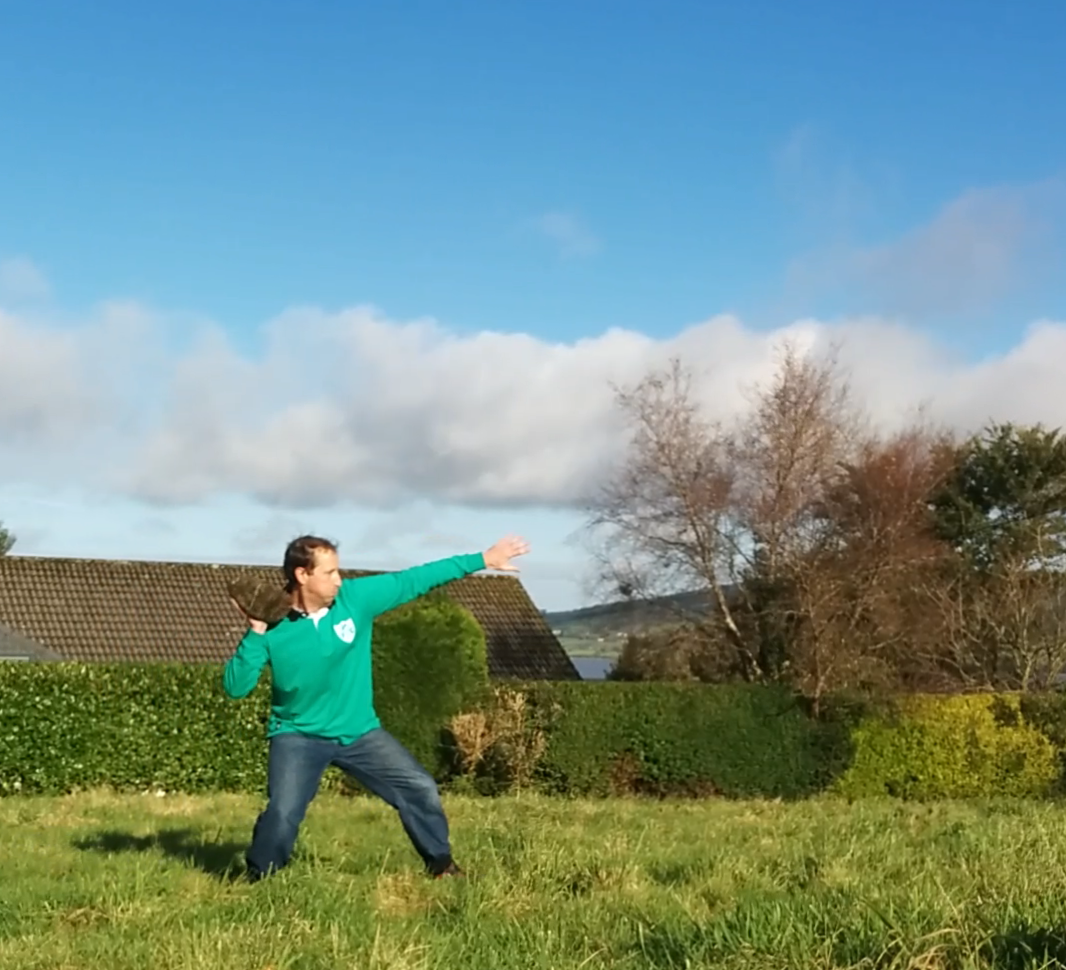
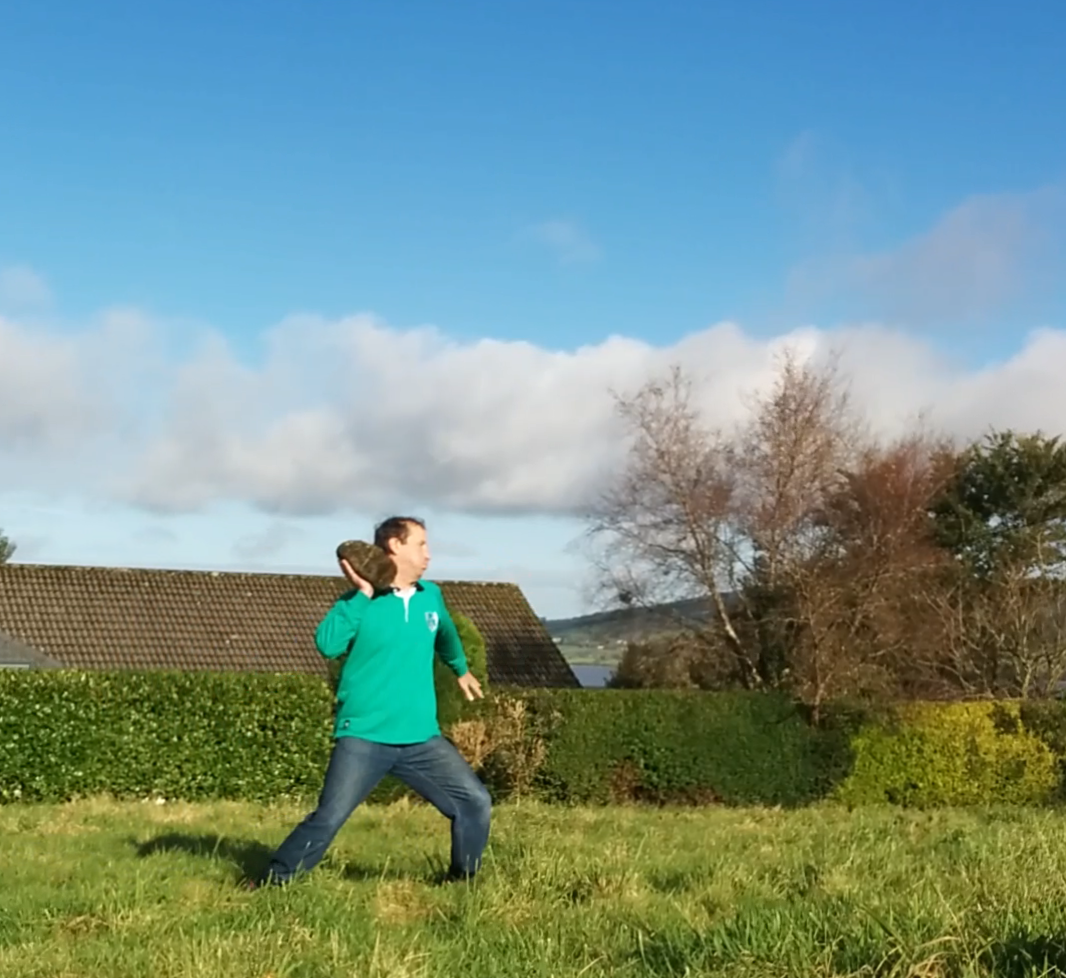
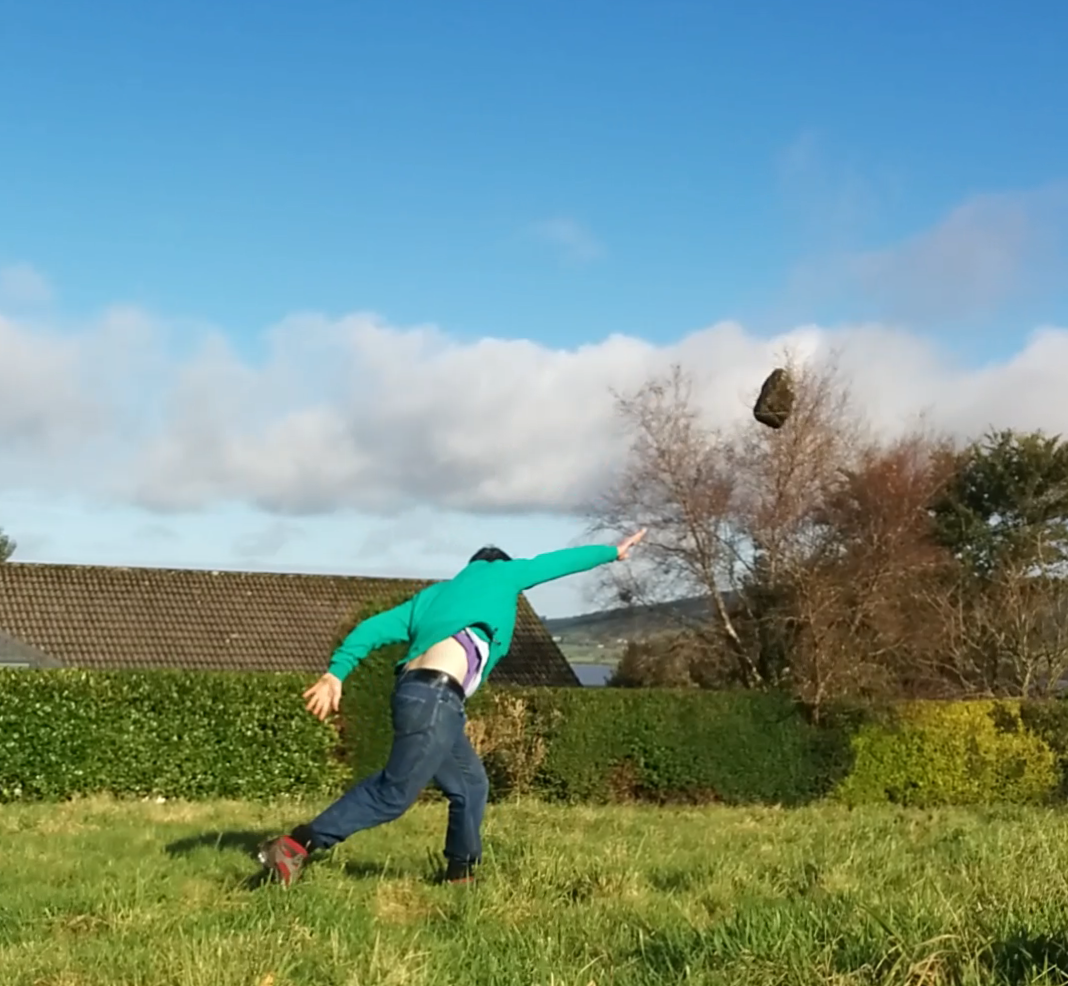
A one handed throw of a moderately heavy stone from the shoulder (a stone put)

Strength and weight training

- Training with double-weighted weapons, and larger weapons such as great swords.
- Pushing heavy stones and moving other large and heavy objects.
- Lifting heavy stones over the head with two hands.

Games and sports played for fitness

- Wrestling
- Fencing. Sword fighting using heavy weapons, heavy armour and heavy shields.
- Staff fighting
- Jousting and competing in tournaments which involved various forms of armed combat.
- Tug-o-war
- Mob football, including the Irish Caid, the Welsh Cnapon, and the French La soule. Such games could involve running, jumping, wrestling, and climbing depending on the playing surface.

=== Renaissance ===
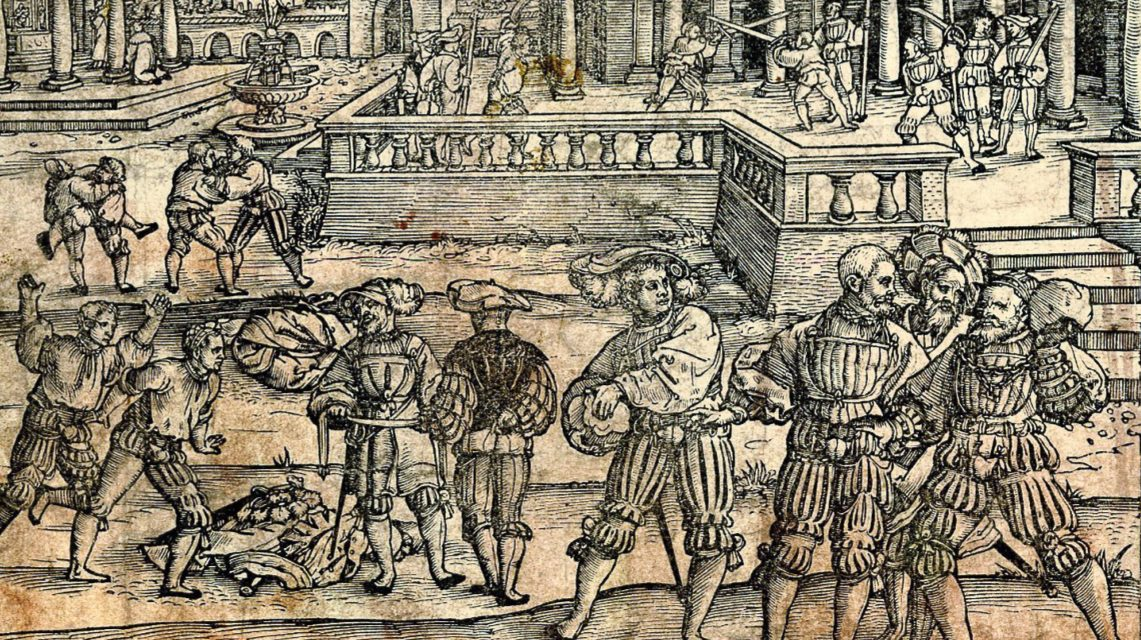
A training scene showing various exercises such as wrestling, fencing, and throwing a stone (stone putting). By Sebald Beham (1500–1550).

Ballistic Training

- Stone putting. One handed from the shoulder. Throwing heavy stones.
- Stangeschieben, was the holding of a tapered stick by the narrow end over the shoulder, and throwing it so that it landed thick end first.
- Javelin throw

Plyometrics

- Jumping, including jumping onto a horse or onto a table.

Calisthenics

- Climbing, including scaling forts, and climbing up ropes using varying numbers of ropes and different climbing styles.
- Running, including running and jumping
- Gymnastics including bridging, handstands, and acrobatics.
- Vaulting
- Swimming
- Horse riding including for long distances

Co-operative calisthenics

- A person stands on a sturdy plate, which is then lifted up by other people.
- A person sits in a chair which is connected to a pulley system. The person is then hoisted upwards by other people who are pulling downwards on the pulleys.
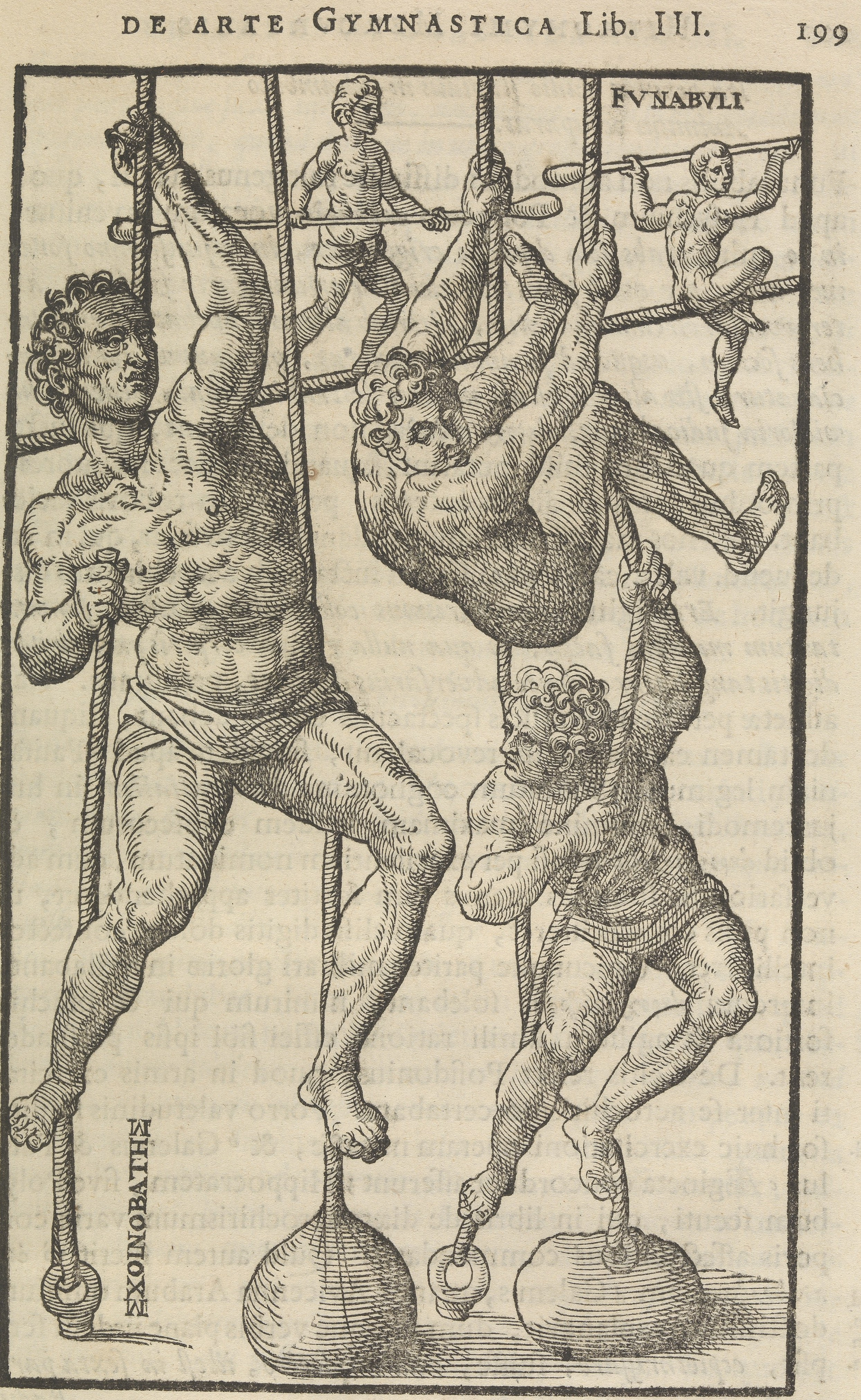
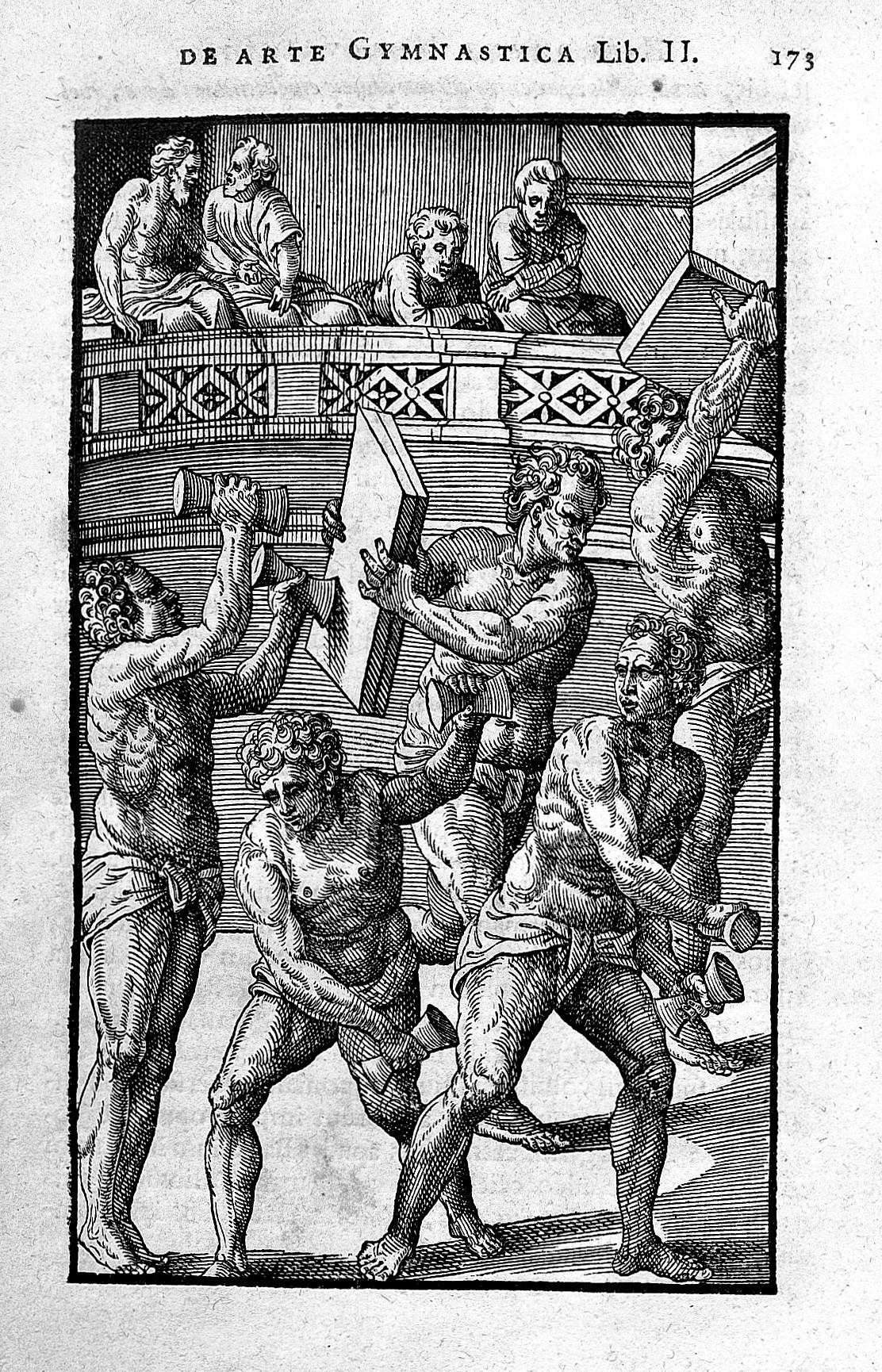
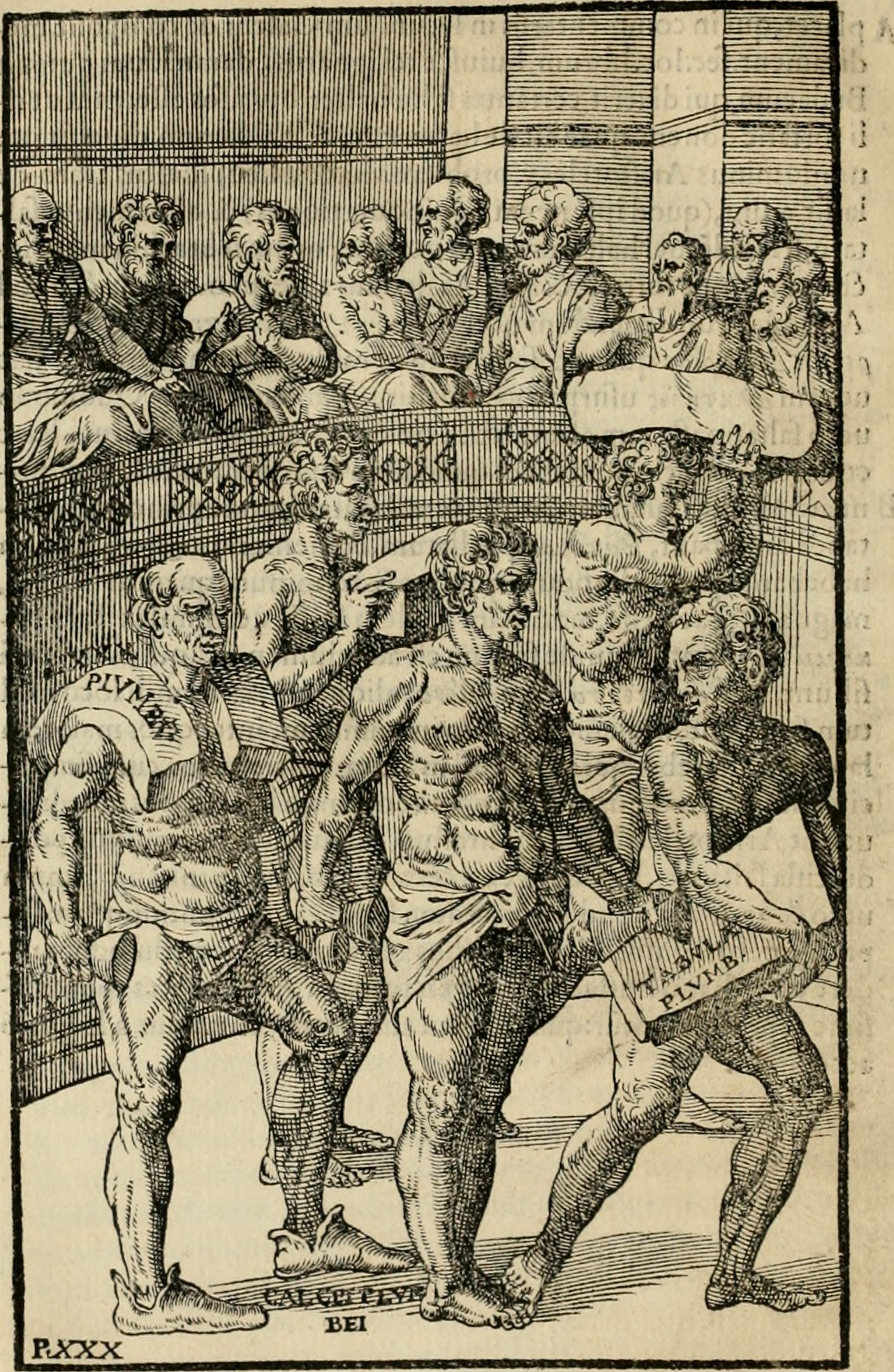
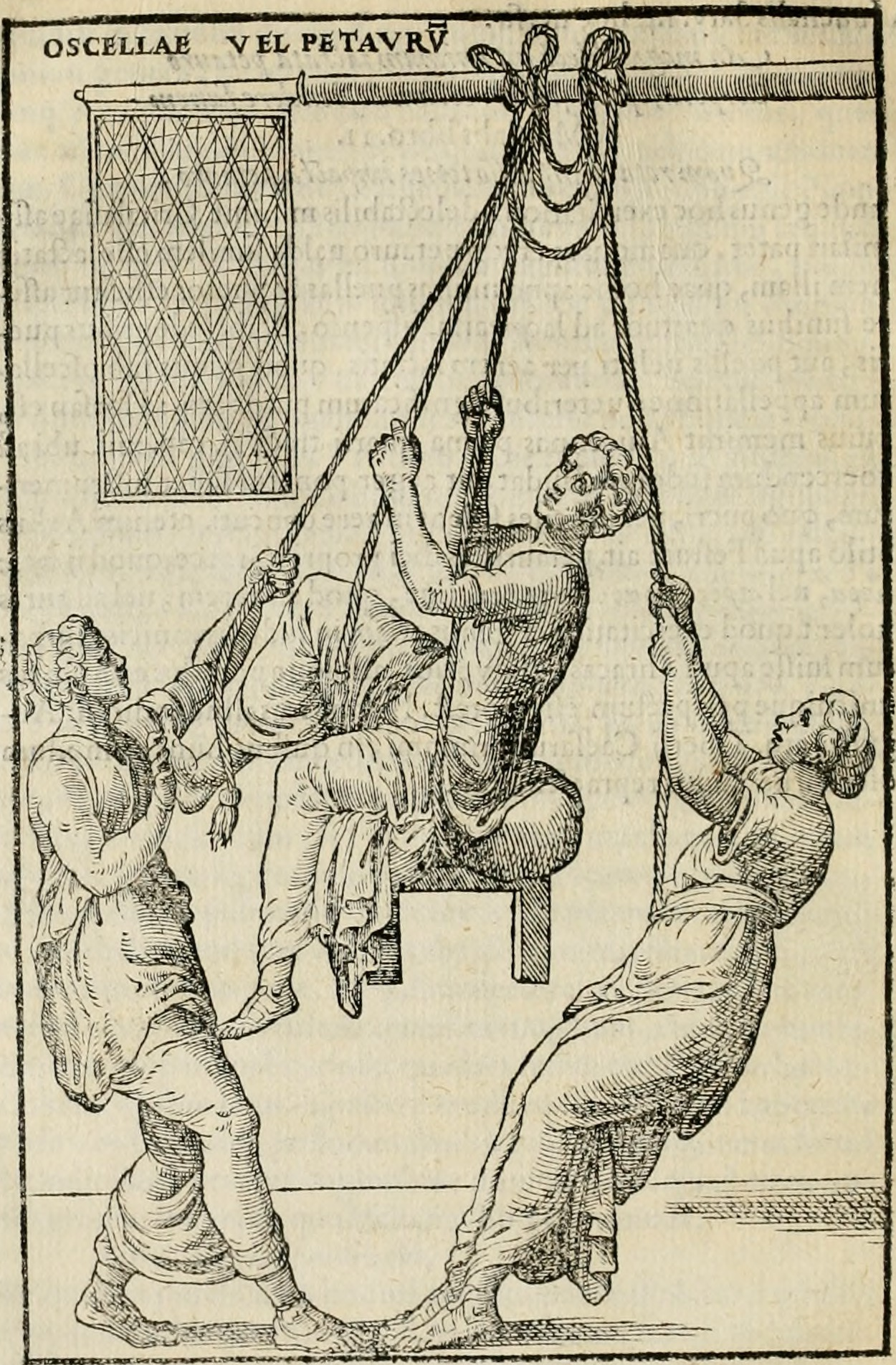
Pages from the De Arte Gymnastica (Venice, 1569) by Girolamo Mercuriale; demonstrate variations of climbing and weight training exercises.

Strength and weight training

- Practicing with heavy weapons
- Holding and moving dumbbells around the body with a stepping action and twist of the torso. A similar routine is depicted whilst the exerciser holds a large square plate.
- Hanging weights over the shoulders.
- Lifting heavy stones including one handed lifts over the head.
- Weight lifting, including moving large and heavy objects

Games and sports played for fitness

- Wrestling
- Fencing, including fighting with great swords, and sword and shield
- Pike training

=== 1750–1950 ===
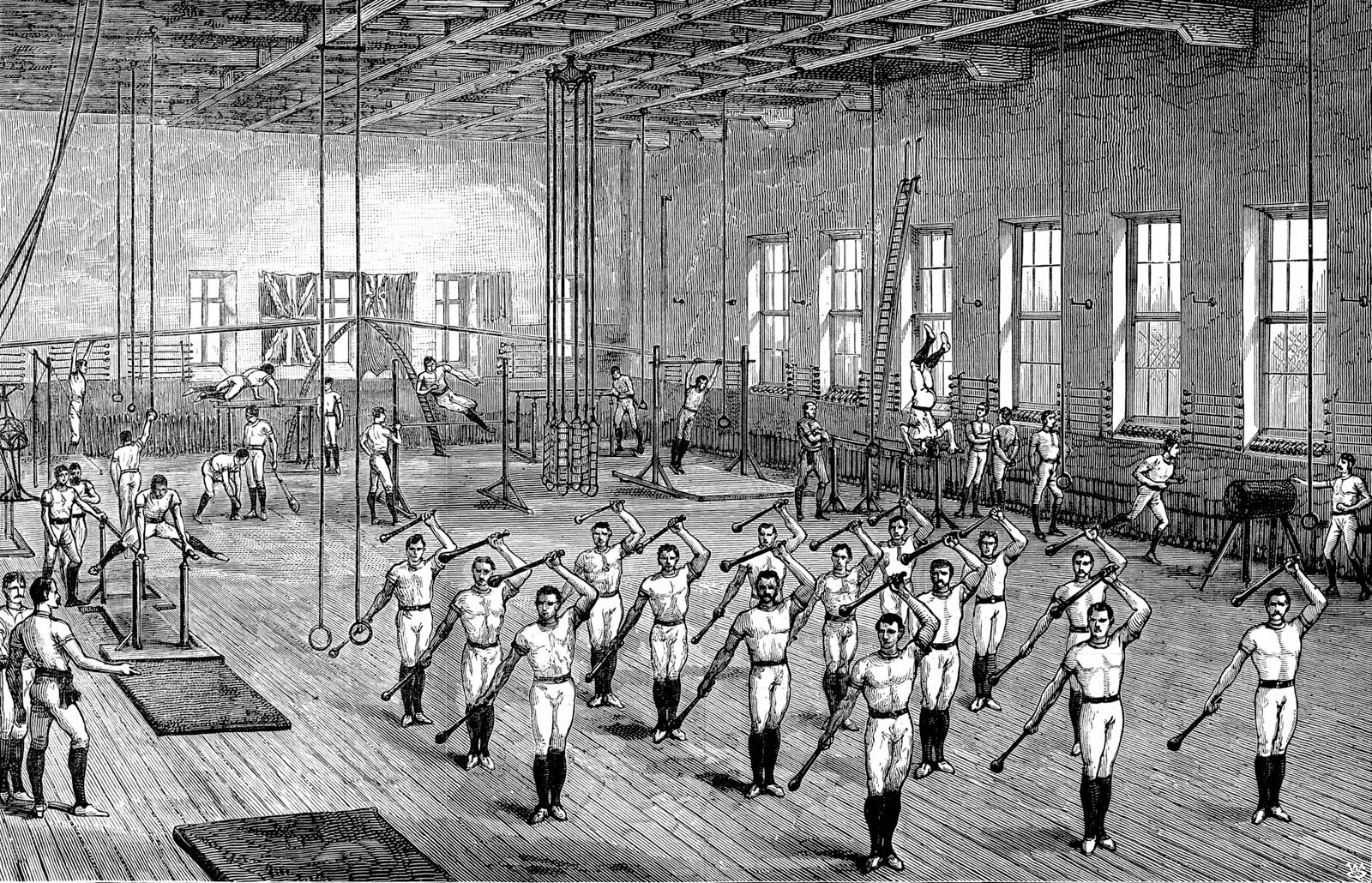
This engraving on wood shows gymnastics, monkey bars, and synchronised Indian club swinging being practiced in a large gym run by the YMCA. London, c. 1888.

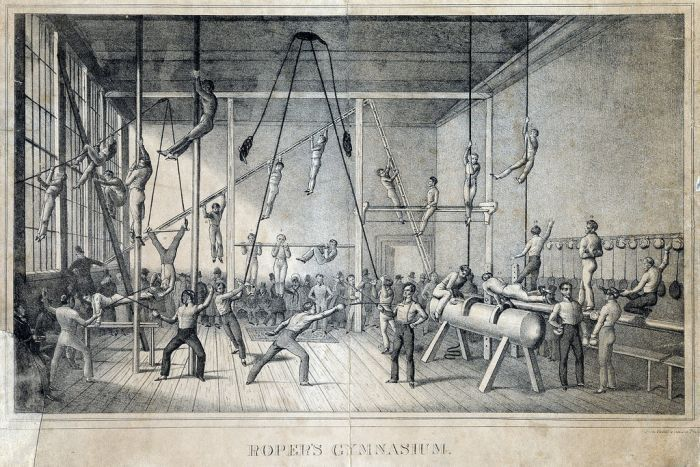
Gymnastics, climbing, fencing, and boxing in a commercial gym environment. Roper's gymnasium, Philadelphia, c. 1831.

Ballistic training

- Throwing the javelin

Plyometrics training

- Hurdling
- Vaulting

Calisthenics

- Climbing. Rope climbing using different rope patterns and climbing styles. Climbing up a sheer vertical post. Climbing up the underside of a ladder using the hands only. Climbing a ladder with legs as bent as possible.
- Monkey bars
- Chin ups
- Walking and balancing along narrow beams
- Gymnastics, including parallel bars, gymnastics horse, and Olympic rings
- Seesaw ladder. Like a normal seesaw but instead of a cross beam that is sat on, it has a ladder crossbeam which each person reaches up to hold onto. They are thereby lifted up from the ground whilst holding onto the underside of the ladder crossbeam. They then descend, land, go into a squat, and then push the ladder upwards in a jumping action so that they go up and the other person goes down.
- Pole vault
- Body weight squats and one-legged bodyweight squats (pistol squats)

Strength and weight training

- Holding and moving dumbbells around the body often with a stepping action.
- Swinging wooden clubs (Indian clubs)
- Weighted pulley exercises
- Pulling a loaded sled up a hill
- Gym machines
- Free weights (kettlebell, dumbbell, barbell)
- Cable exercises

Games and sports played for fitness

- Wrestling
- Rock Climbing
- Fencing
- Gymnastics
- Cricket
- Quoits
- Tennis
- Cycling
- Bodybuilding
- Olympic weightlifting

=== India ===
Physical culture in the Indian subcontinent has historically been tied to military training and religious practice. Archaeological finds from the Indus Valley Civilization, such as the Pashupati seal, have been interpreted by some scholars as representing early precursors to yogic postures, though this remains a subject of academic debate. During the Vedic period, physical exercises were often restricted to the Kshatriya (warrior) class and included archery, chariot racing, and wrestling (Malla-yuddha).

By the medieval period, physical training was formalized in Akhara (gymnasiums). These institutions focused on Pehlwani, a style of wrestling that integrated Persian and indigenous techniques. Training involved the use of weighted implements such as the Gada (mace), stone weights (Nal), and heavy wooden clubs known as Indian clubs (Jori).

The arrival of the British in the 19th century introduced Western sports like Cricket, Football, and Polo. While Polo was popularized among the Indian elite and military, indigenous forms of physical culture persisted. During the early 20th century, organizations such as the Hanuman Vyayam Prasarak Mandal (HVPM) attempted to modernize traditional Indian fitness for international audiences, including a demonstration at the 1936 Summer Olympics.

=== China ===
British and French imperialism brought European sport practices and training routines to much of the world, including most of Asia and Africa. An important exception was China, which developed its own athletic traditions. However after 1920, the Nationalist and communist governments emphasized Western sports.

== Common training focuses ==
The main training focus shared across all historical periods is achieving good general health through physical fitness. The most obvious visual sign for a person achieving this was looking 'in shape'. In other words, the body's muscular proportions being in the correct ratio to each other, having good posture in general, and not carrying too much or too little fat.

When physical training was used to prepare for athletics or warfare, the focus was predominantly on agility, speed, explosive power, and endurance. There was little attempt to emulate the form of physicality associated with the peasant or manual labourer, because the kind of strength developed by those roles was considered too slow and unagile for competition, be it in athletics or war. For this reason, exercises that required powerful, dynamic movements were more frequently recommended than those that required slow-moving strength i.e. ballistic training and plyometrics more so than heavy weight lifting.

Representations of athletes and warriors typically have very similar body proportions: a large, well developed torso, large or very large gluteal muscles, and a build that overall looks muscular, athletic, and robust. The commonality of this body shape for people throughout history who have undergone physical training means it was a build that was the result of, and reciprocally supported the further achievement of, the training goals of agility, speed, explosive power, and endurance.

Athletes, especially in Greece and Rome, tended to be thicker set than warriors who were in general leaner. This was partly due to athletes being able to depend on regular meals and sleep patterns, and warriors having to be prepared to be deprived of these. Therefore, it was easier for an athlete to maintain a more muscular frame whereas it was a difficult, and arguably unnecessary, task for a warrior involved in campaigning. The relative proportions of the build were however similar which shows there was a belief in optimum physical proportions which would best allow someone to achieve a variety of physical tasks. On this subject, the historian E. Norman Gardinier notes that while in Ancient Greece there were variations in the builds of the athletes based upon the event they specialised in, these variations were slight and there was a universal standard of development which was the result of universal forms of athletic training. He goes on to argue that for this reason statues of athletes would be made with a sign of the event they specialized in, otherwise, it would be too difficult to tell them apart based on their physical development alone. For similar reasons of attempting to achieve the optimum body proportions for moving in a fast, agile, and powerful manner, people throughout history, who have undertaken physical training, tend to be of similar proportions.

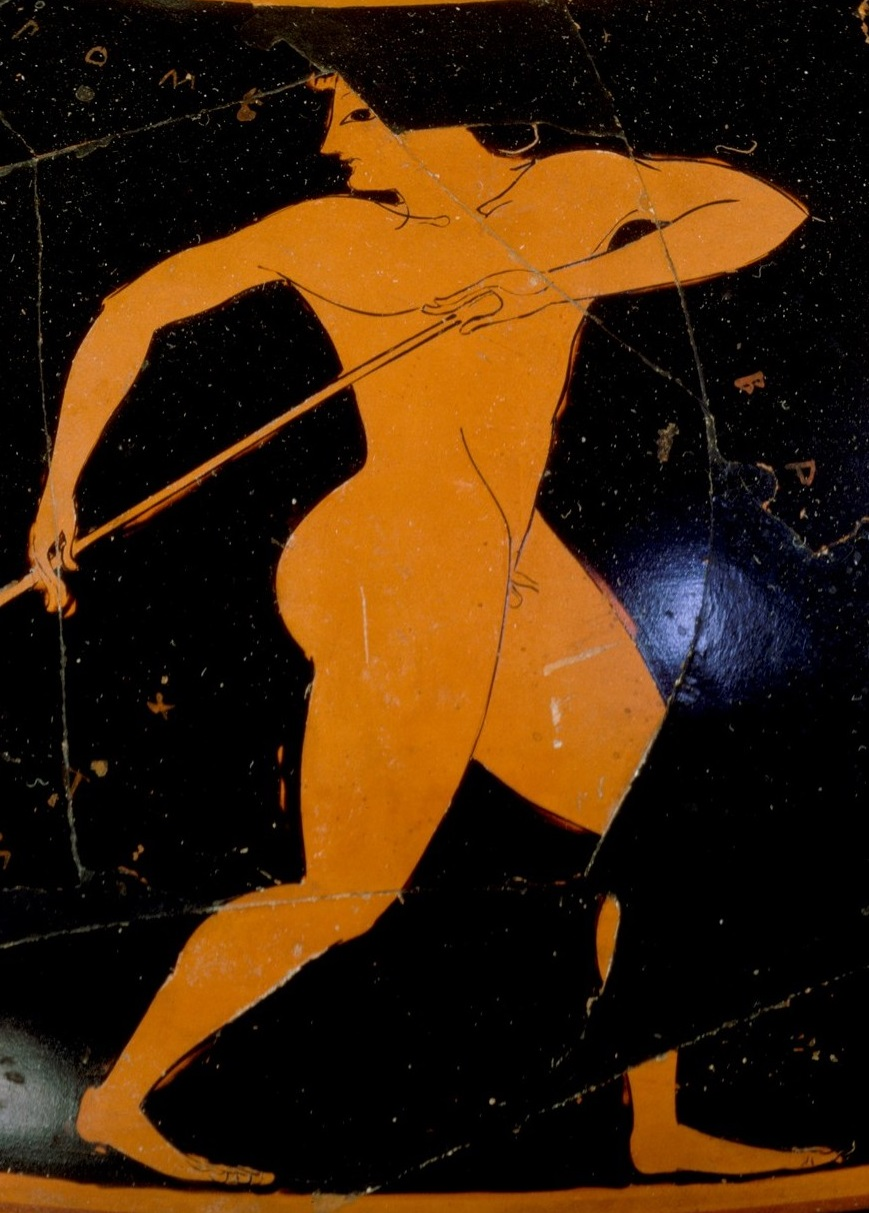
An Ancient Greek javelin thrower represented on a vase, c. 520 BC

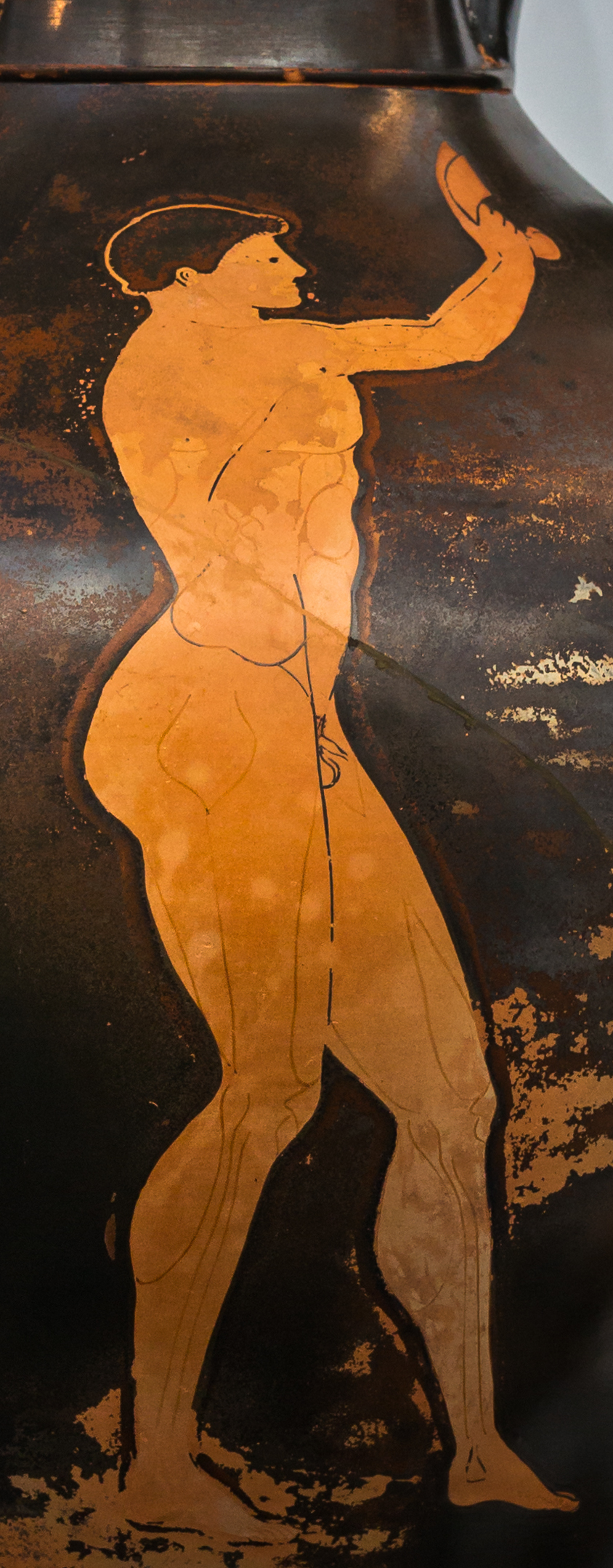
A long jumper holding halteres and preparing himself to jump Staatliche Antikensammlungen, c. 500–490 BC

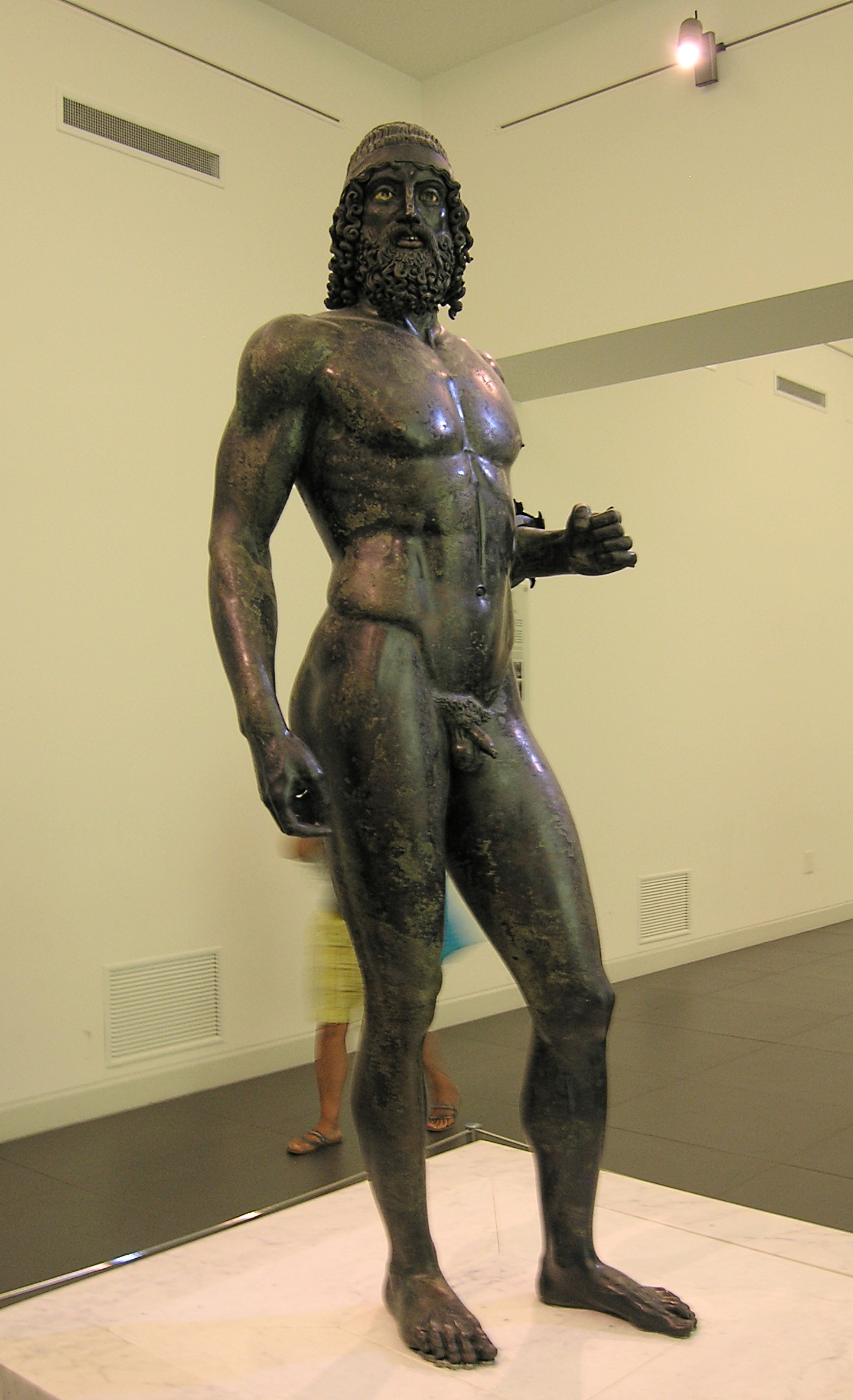
An Ancient Greek warrior in bronze. Riace Bronzes, Museo Nazionale della Magna Grecia, c. 450 BC

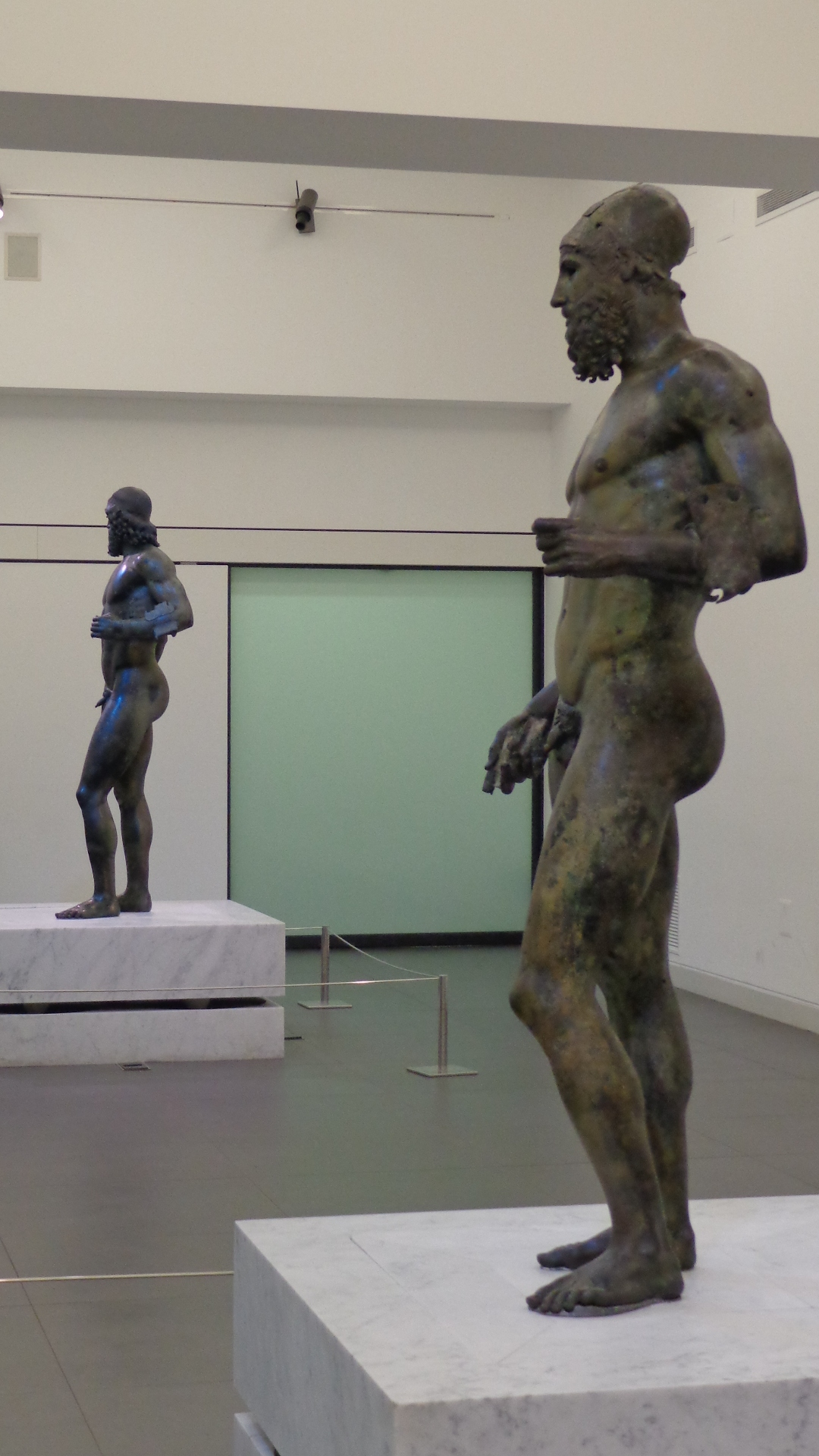
Riace Bronzes, Museo Nazionale della Magna Grecia, c. 450 BC

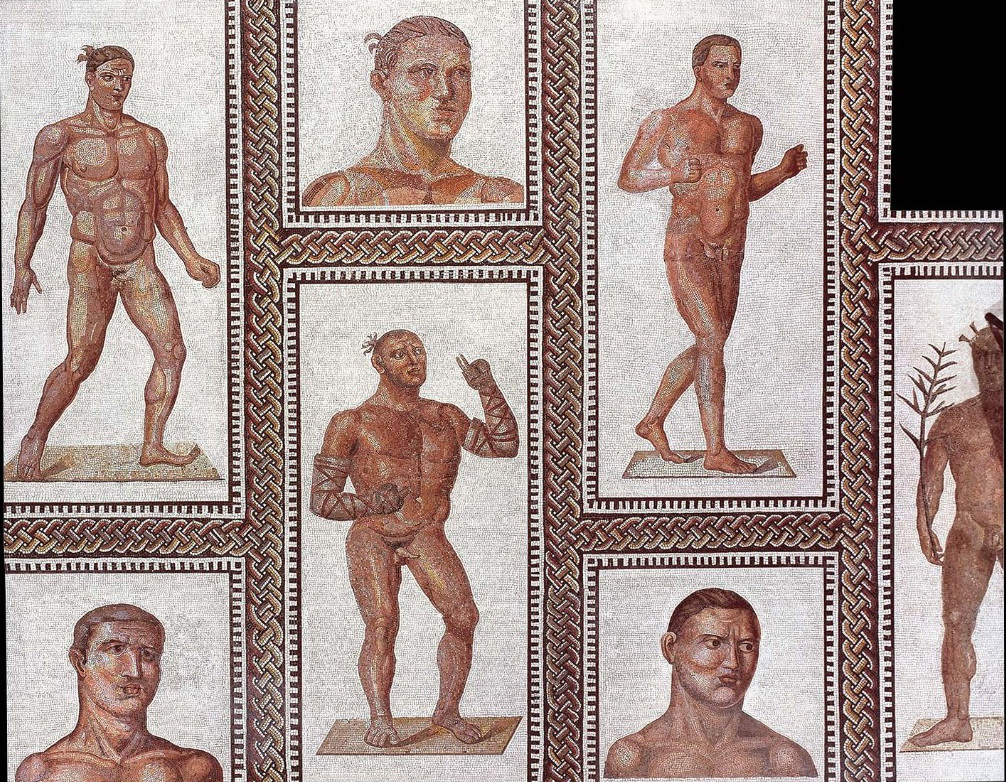
A mosaic featuring Roman athletes from the Baths of Caracalla, constructed c. 216–235 AD

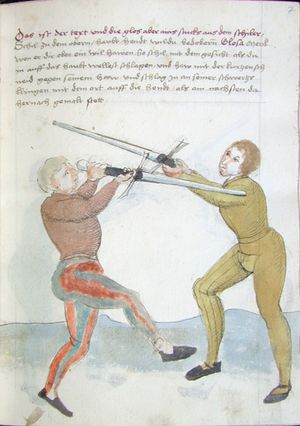
Two-handed sword fighting instructional by Sigmund Ringeck, c. 15th century AD

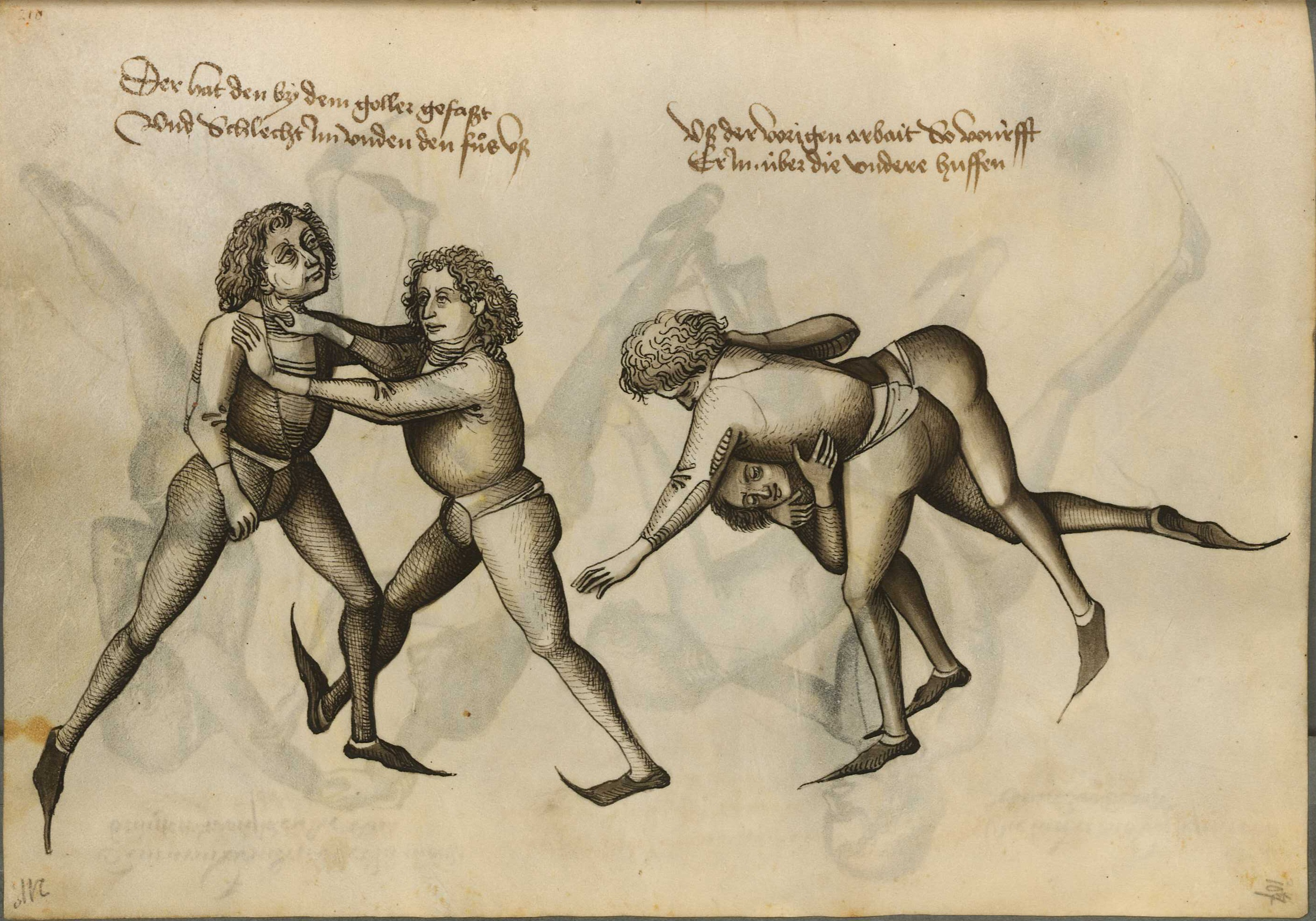
Wrestling in a fight book by Hans Talhoffer

== Women's physical training ==
Women's physical training had many similarities to men's but was markedly tailored towards their physical requirements. This generally meant that it had an increased emphasis on agility, and a reduced emphasis on power and endurance. In general, the training was notably less intense than that undertaken by men. This was due to inter-related physiological and cultural reasons. The main physiological reasons women were not supposed to train like men were related to fertility. Whilst discussion on women's physical training is relatively scarce in historical sources, there are two reasons which predominate. Considered in the context of 19th-century France, the first is that intense physical training was not compatible with a woman's menstrual cycle. The two together could lead to exhaustion, especially during adolescence. For similar reasons it was considered to be incompatible with pregnancy and periods of breast feeding. The second reason is that intense physical training tended to involve, or be preparation for, direct physical competition which would involve taking various knocks and impacts. It was considered that if a woman was struck in the area of her uterus it could cause long term damage, and negatively affect fertility. Whilst it is unclear to what extent such positions applied to women's training throughout history, it is clear that intense and prolonged physical training, and full contact games have been avoided in general.

The more common exercises which were undertaken by women include running (including sprinting), jumping, light stone or shot put, light dumbbell exercises, archery, fencing, swinging Indian clubs, swimming, ball games, racket sports, and various forms of gymnastics. The Heraean Games were the women's equivalent of the Ancient Olympic Games and took place prior to the men's competitions. According to the historian E. Norman Gardinier:

At the festival there were races for maidens of various ages. Their course was 500 feet, or one-sixth less than the men's stadium. The maidens ran with their hair down their backs, a short tunic reaching just below the knee, and their right shoulder bare to the breast. The victors received crowns of olive and a share of the heifer sacrificed to Hera. They had, too, the right of setting up their statues in the Heraeum.

It is notable that historical artwork which depicts women, on average, shows them with significantly smaller breasts than women in the modern day. Women athletes and warrioresses tend to be represented either not wearing any form of breast support or, more rarely, use a breast band, such as is demonstrated in the Roman 'bikini girls' mosaic.

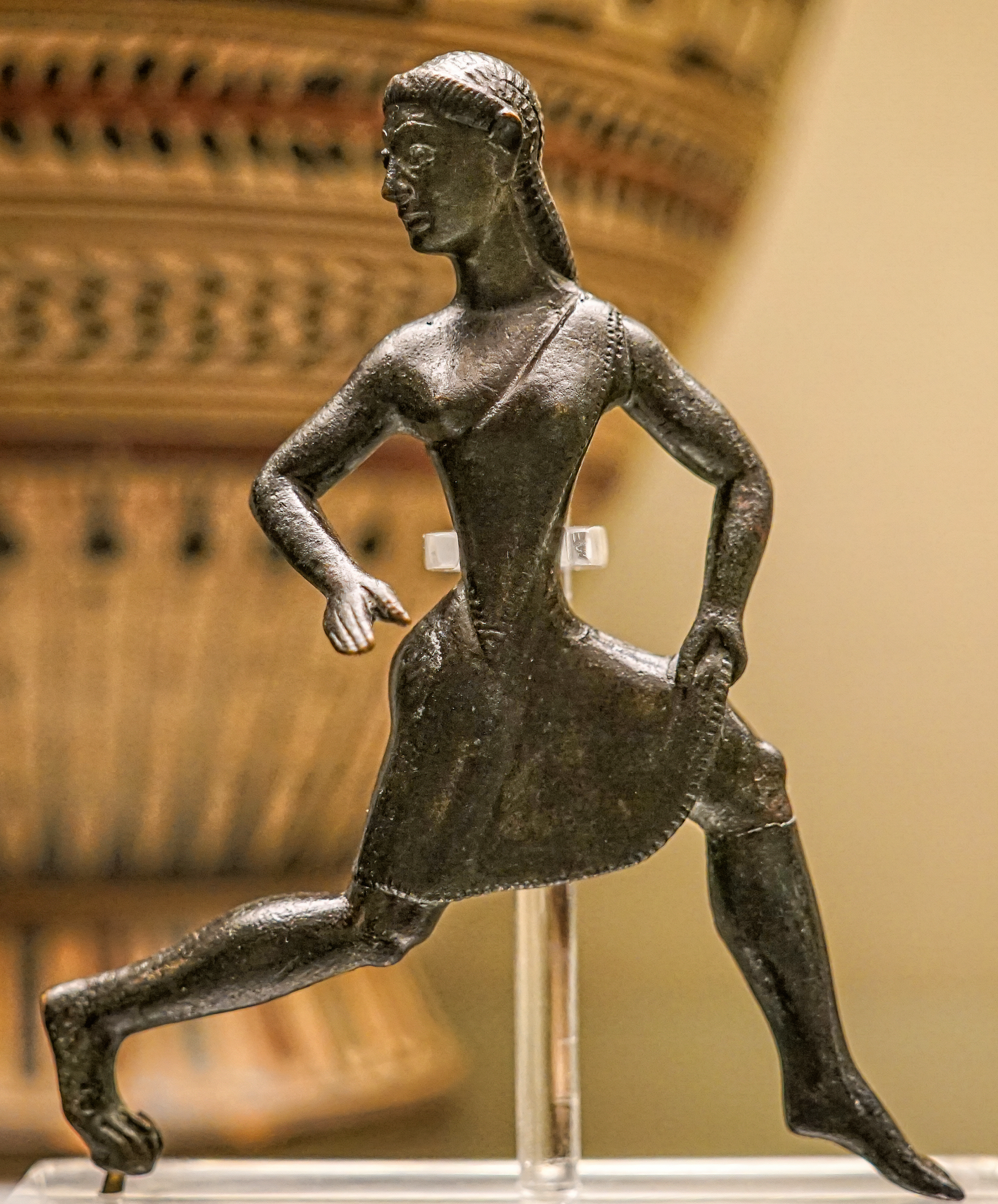
Bronze figure of a running woman from Sparta. The baring of one breast was a sign that a woman was engaging in athletics or warfare. British Museum, 520–500 BC.

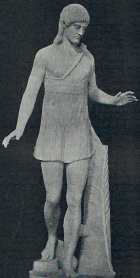
A victress of the Heraean Games, represented near the start of a race, 5th century BC

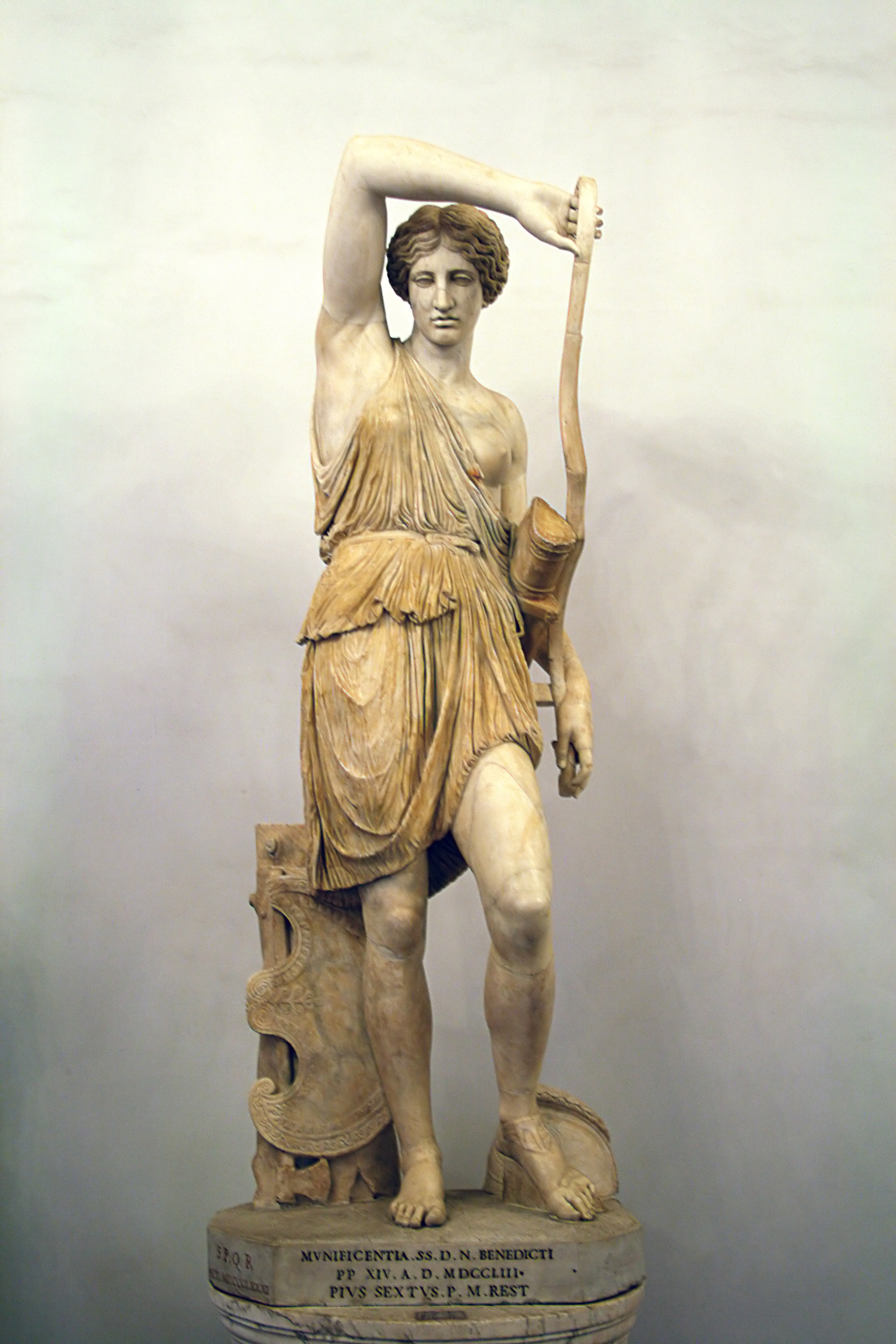
A statue of a wounded Amazon, who were warrioresses with a preference for archery. Musei Capitolini, 5th century BC.

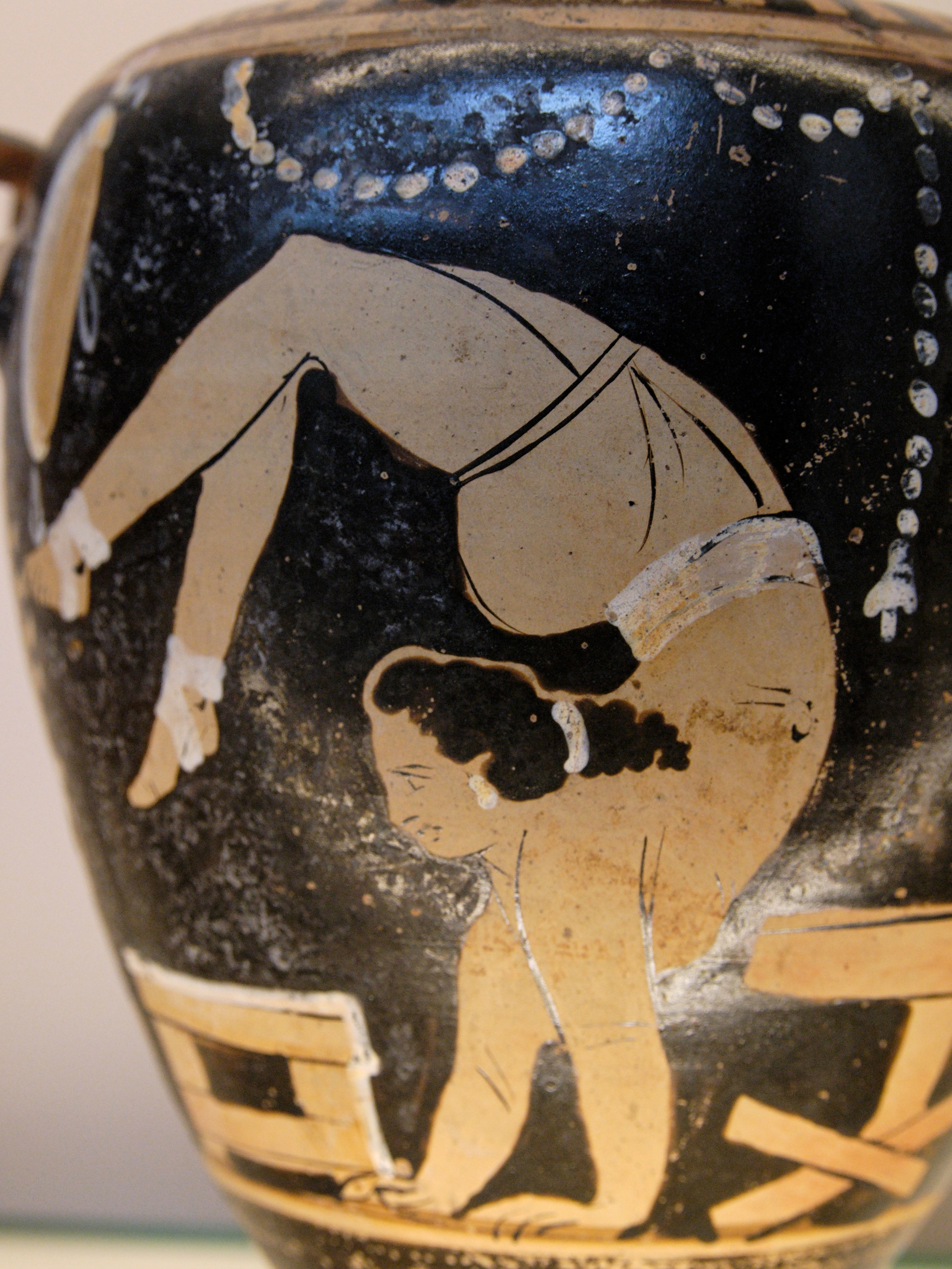
An acrobat featured on a Campanian (Italian) red-figure hydria, c. 340–330 BC

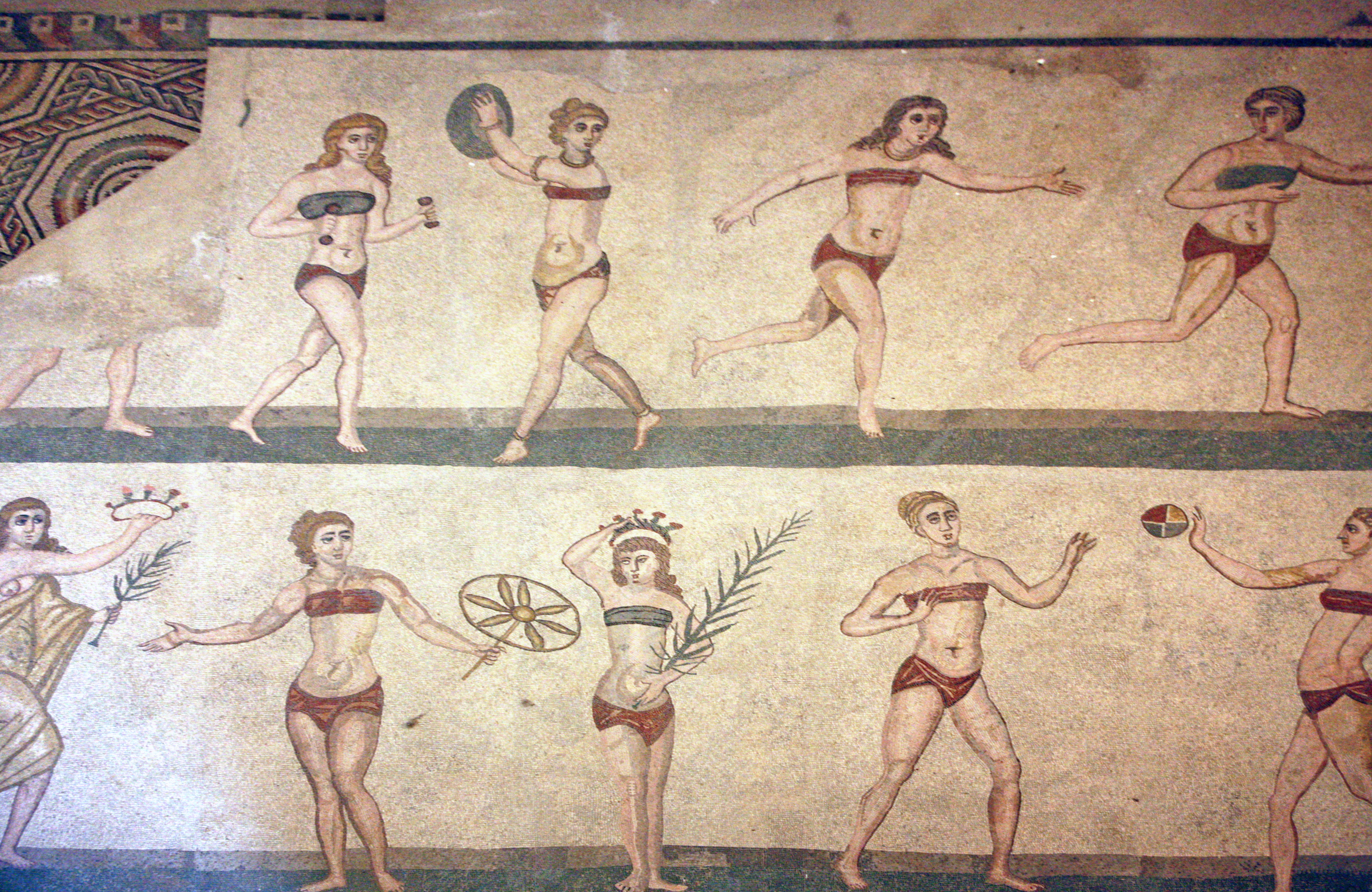
This mosaic, called the Coronation of the Winner and nicknamed the bikini girls, shows Roman women engaged in athletic activities such as swinging a discus, hitting a ball to each other, and stepping whilst using dumbbells. Villa Romana del Casale, 4th century AD.

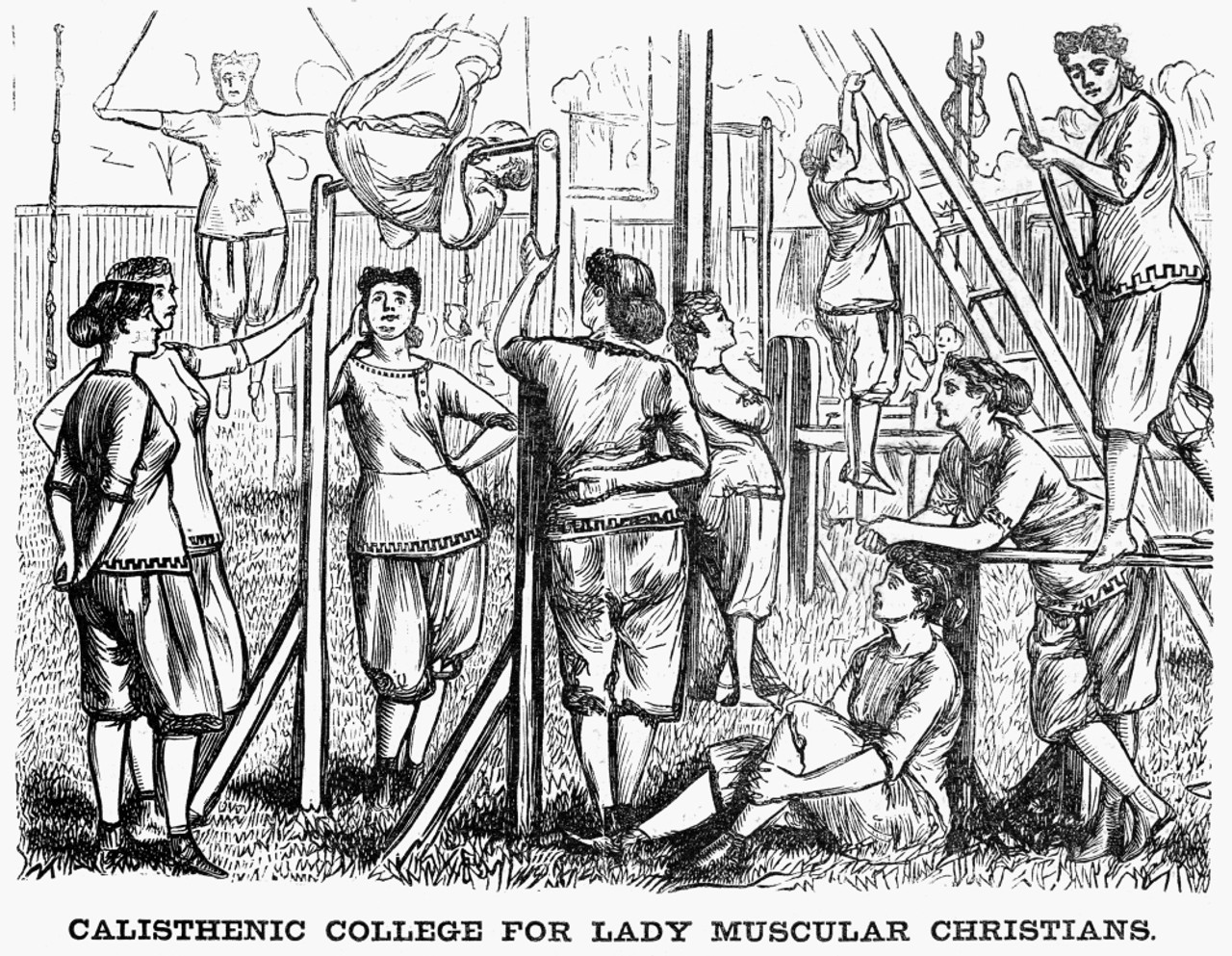
Calisthenics in a gym environment. The exercises include olympic rings, climbing the underside of a ladder, balance beams, and spinning around a high horizontal bar. Granger Collection, 1867.

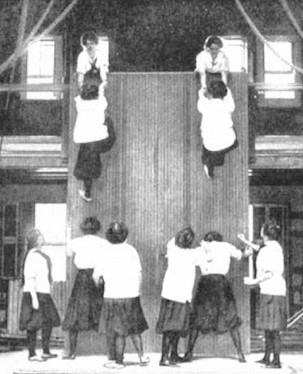
Students co-operate to scale a high wall. The activity involves lifting someone up, wall walking, and pulling someone up; c. 1900.

== See also ==
- Physical fitness
- Health
- History of public health in the United Kingdom
- History of public health in the United States
- Physical exercise
- Power training
