= Physcoa =

In Greek mythology, Physcoa (Ancient Greek: Φυσκόα Phuskóa) was a woman from the deme Orthia of Elis. She was credited with a variety of notable deeds, which are recorded in Pausanias' Description of Greece.

Physcoa was believed to have belonged to the very first, legendary set of the so-called Sixteen Women. One of the accounts cited by Pausanias relates that the Eleans suffered much harm from Damophon, tyrant of Pisa, and that after his death people of both Pisa and Elis chose to no longer associate with his misdeeds and to establish mutual peace. For that purpose, each of the sixteen cities of Elis sent a female envoy, "this woman to be the oldest, the most noble, and the most esteemed of all the women"; one of the delegates was Physcoa. The Sixteen Women performed the establishment of peace, and were subsequently entrusted with management of the Heraean Games, particularly with ritual weaving of the robe for Hera.

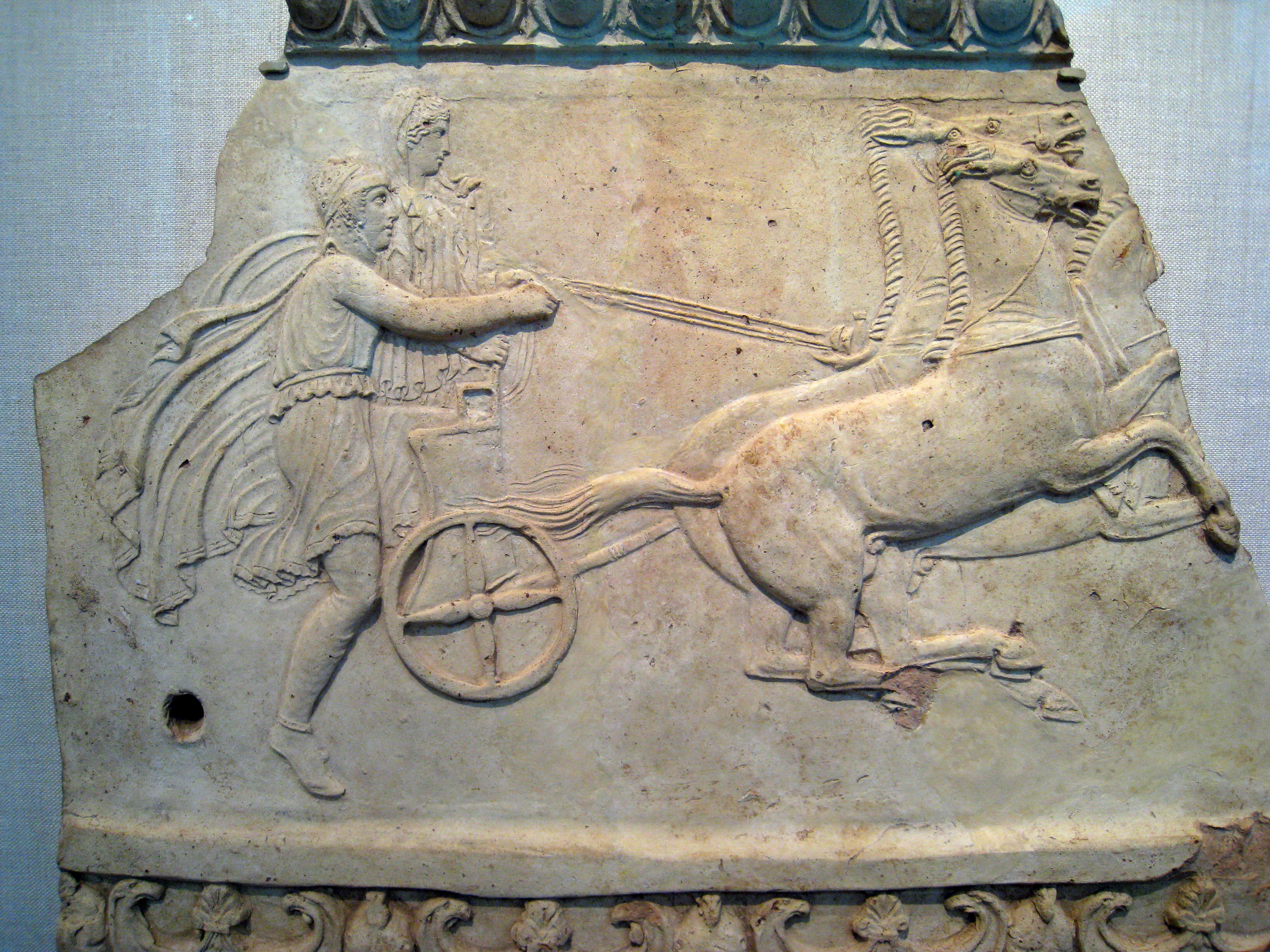
Hippodamia with Pelops in a racing chariot, from a fragmentary relief

Another of Pausanias' sources informs that it was Hippodamia who introduced the Heraean Games so as to express gratitude to Hera for arranging her marriage to Pelops, and assembled the Sixteen Women as co-founders of the tradition. There were two choral dances of which the Sixteen Women were in charge, one of them being named after Physcoa and the other one after Hippodamia.

Physcoa was said to have consorted with Dionysus and to have had by him a son Narcaeus. When Narcaeus grew up, it is related, he conquered many neighboring peoples and gained a lot of power; he was also credited with founding the sanctuary of Athena Narcaea. Narcaeus and Physcoa were also reported to be the first people to pay homage to Dionysus as a god.

Pausanias mentions that various honors were paid to Physcoa, and these included making her the eponym of the ritual dance.
