= Bronze statuettes of athletic Spartan girls =

Ancient Greek bronze figurines

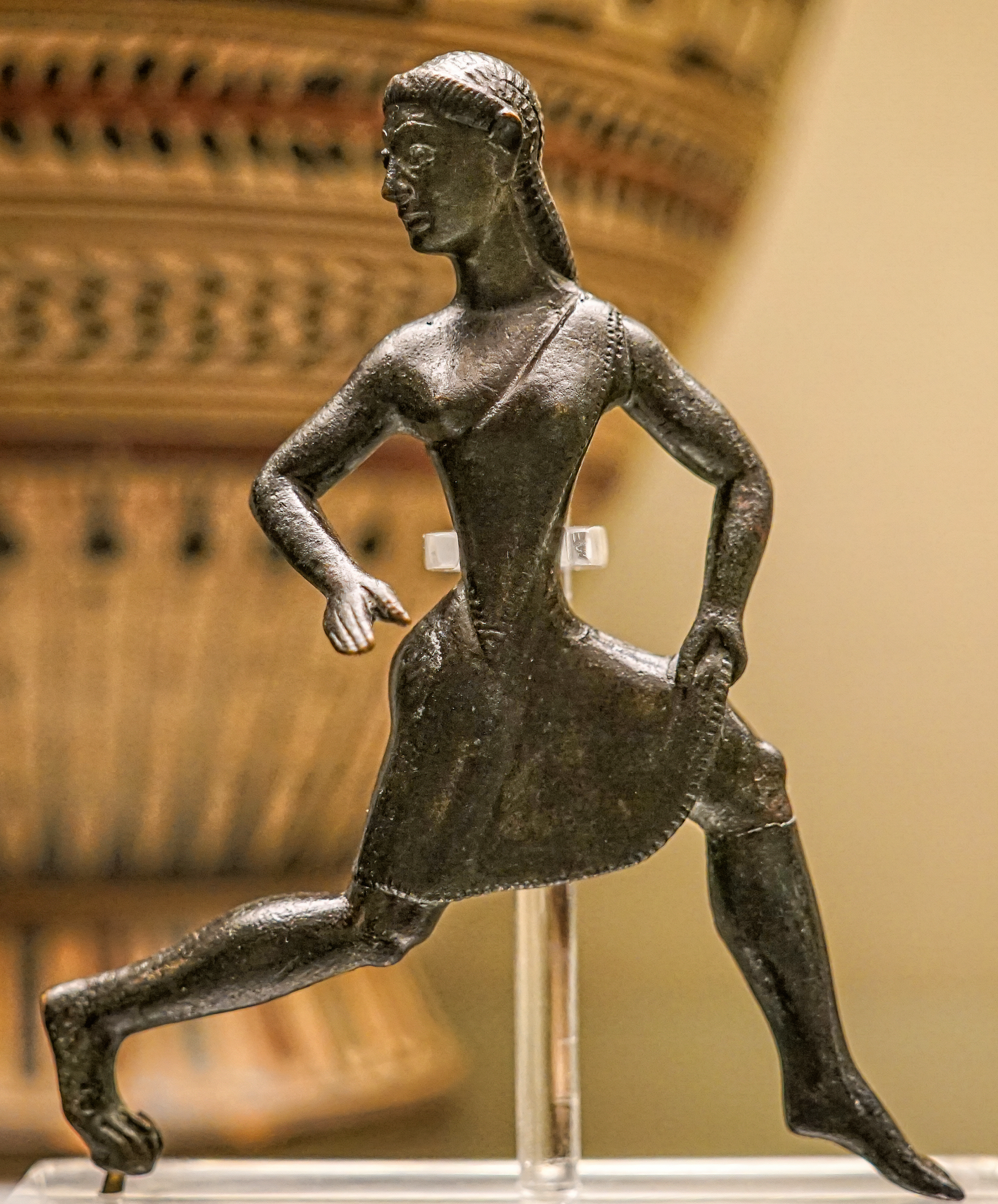

The bronze statuettes of athletic Spartan girls are bronze figurines depicting a young Spartan woman wearing a short tunic in a presumably running pose. These statuettes are considered to be of Spartan manufacture and to date from the 6th century B.C.; they were used as decorative attachments to ritual vessels as votive dedications, such as a cauldron, suggested by the bronze rivet on their feet. The figures typically have their hair hung down, right arm slightly bent, left hand lifted the hem of the chiton skirt and expose part of the left thigh, likely to facilitate the movement, and their legs in a wide stride.

The style of the statuettes is attributed to Laconian (the region where Sparta is located) workshops in the Archaic Period. The typical characteristics of Laconian bronzes are slender bodies with unproportional muscular legs, arched and swelling thighs, immature chests in female figures, and long faces with strongly marked facial features. Laconian bronzes were widely traded, which helps to explain why some of those Laconian manufacture were not discovered in the region. It may also suggest the possible presence of Laconian craftsmen at that site.

== History ==
=== Female athletic costume in ancient Greece ===
The statuette in the British Museum depicts a girl wearing a short chiton affixed to the left shoulder, leaving the right shoulder and breast bare. This is the type of athletic costume especially for participants in the Heraean Games, the earliest recorded women's running competition held quadrennially in Olympic stadium. Although women in Ancient Greece (except Sparta) were not encouraged to participate in athletic activities and were excluded from the Olympic games, they could participate in the foot race at the Heraea, which was an athletic event for females of all ages. Thus, this particular piece depicts a participant in the Heraea. One speculation proposed that the costume is adapted from a light garment worn by men in hot weather or while performing hard labor.

The piece from the National Archaeological Museum, Athens, found at Dodona, is wearing a different kind of dress. Unlike the costume for Heraea Game, the bodice of the chiton covers both shoulders and breasts. It may suggest that this running costume is for girls at local ritual festivals in Sparta that are documented in ancient literature. During the festival, some Spartan maidens ran a special race in honor of Dionysus. This ritual celebrating the girls' rites of passage also involved dancing, singing and other athletic events.

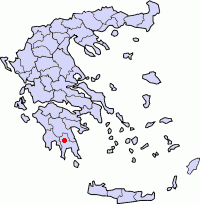
Location of Sparta in Laconia region of Greece

=== Athletic Spartan women ===
Women in Sparta led very different lives from their counterparts in the rest part of ancient Greece in terms of engagement in athletics. Spartan girls were offered a state-supervised educational system separated from the boys, including a physical training program. The aim of the program was to produce healthy mothers of healthy warriors. Spartan girls engaged in various athletic events including running and wrestling. They might even wrestle boys.

Spartan girls were said to wear very little when they did sports. Wearing short tunics exposing half of their thighs, Spartan females were called "thigh flashers" according to some accounts in ancient Greece. There were complaints that they left home "with bare thighs and loosened tunics" on their way to run and wrestle. Serving as supplements to those ancient literary sources, roughly forty bronze statuettes dating from the Archaic period are found showing young Spartan women dancing or running (including the two discussed ahead). There are even pieces depicting Spartan females playing sports in nudity, just as the Spartan males.
