= Heraean Games =

Ancient women's sports festival in Olympia

The Heraea or Heraia was an ancient Greek festival in which young girls competed in a footrace, possibly as a puberty or pre-nuptial initiation ritual. The race was held every four years at Olympia. The games were organised by a group of sixteen women, who were also responsible for weaving a peplos for Hera and arranging choral dances.

== Origin ==
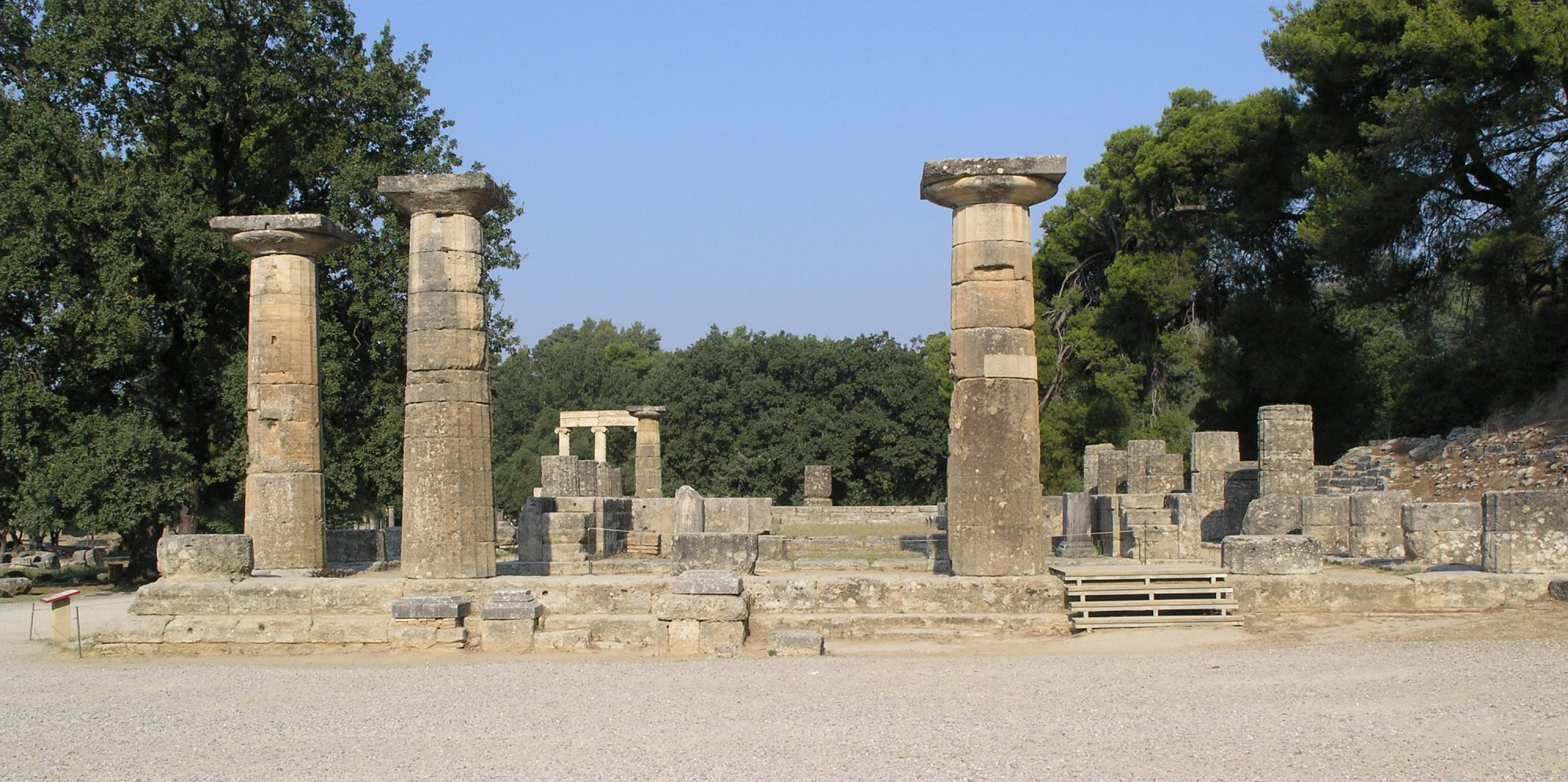
Restored ruins of the Temple of Hera, Olympia

Not much is known about the Heraea, but most of our knowledge comes from Pausanias' Description of Greece. The date that the festival began is uncertain. Pausanias says that the games are αρχαια (archaia, "old"). There is evidence for cult activity in Olympia as far back as the tenth century BC, but the earliest cultic activity at the site appears to centre around the cult of Zeus; the cult of Hera was certainly in place by about 600 BC, when the first temple of Hera at Olympia was built. It is uncertain whether the races were an original feature of the festival, or a later addition.

Pausanias reports an aetiological myth about the founding of the games by Hippodamia. According to this story, the first games were held to celebrate her marriage to Pelops, and she selected sixteen women to compete in the games. He also records a story that around 580 BC there was a dispute between Elis and Pisa. To settle the dispute, the Eleans selected a wise elderly woman from each of sixteen polites in Elis. These sixteen women were given responsibility for the games. This second story might suggest that the games were begun or reorganised in the early sixth century, as happened with other Panhellenic festivals at this time.

== Festival ==
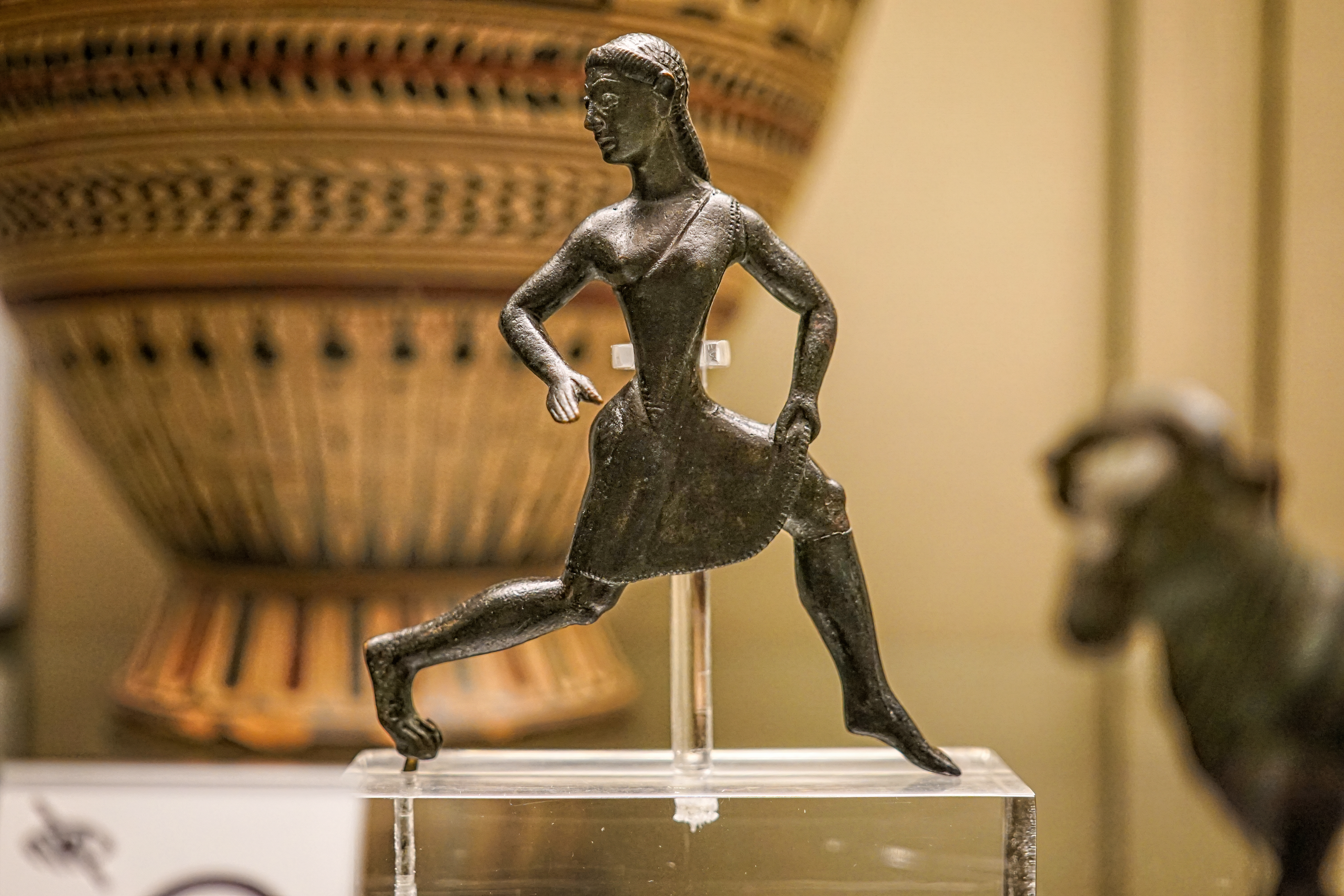
Bronze running girl, c. 560 BC. The figure is probably from Laconia, and dressed as a competitor in the Heraean Games.

The Heraea took place every four years. Some scholars have suggested that the games took place around the time of the ancient Olympics – for instance Matthew Dillon suggests they happened either immediately before or immediately after – but there is no ancient evidence for when the Heraea occurred and Donald G. Kyle argues that due to the ancient Greek custom of secluding women from unrelated males, the event was more likely entirely separate from the Olympics.

The only event at the Heraean Games was the stadion, which was one sixth shorter than the equivalent men's race. Only parthenoi (unmarried young women) competed in the games. Competitors raced in three different age categories, though it is uncertain exactly how old the competitors were. They wore a distinctive outfit of a short chiton cut above the knees, which left the right shoulder and breast bare, and wore their hair loose. This outfit may have derived from the exomis, a variant of the chiton worn by labourers and associated with Hephaestus. A Laconian statuette found in Epirus and now in the British Museum, dating to c. 560 BC, depicts a girl in the costume associated with the Heraean Games; this possibly suggests that unlike other ancient Greek races for girls, the Heraean Games were Panhellenic as early as the sixth century BC.

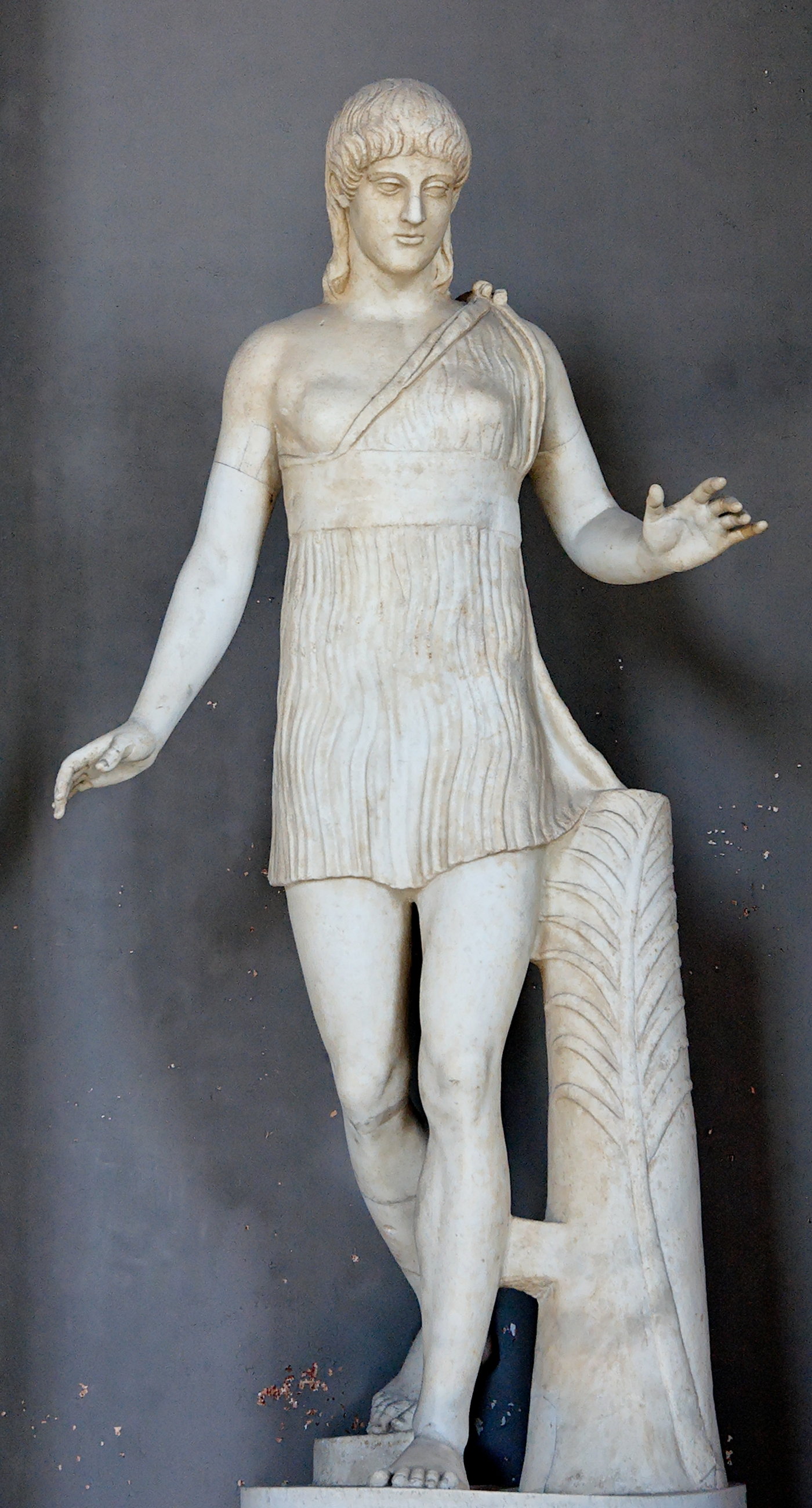
A running girl. The short chiton she wears, exposing her right breast, and her loose hair, are distinctive characteristics of the competitors in the Heraean Games. This marble statue is likely a Roman copy of a Greek original, from c. 460 BC

The winners were awarded a crown of olive leaves and a portion of a cow which was sacrificed to Hera. They were also permitted to dedicate statues inscribed with their name to Hera, though none of these statues survive. The names of no historical victors are known for the games; the only name given by Pausanias is the mythical Chloris.

The festival of the Heraea was presided over by a group of sixteen women, who as well as conducting the games were responsible for weaving a peplos for Hera and arranging choral dances in honour of Hippodameia and Physcoa. The sixteen women apparently went through the same purification ritual as the Hellanodikai who presided over the ancient Olympic Games, and probably also took part in a procession from Elis to Olympia before the games; also like the Hellanodikai they were quartered in a special building in Elis.

The Heraean Games may have been puberty rites or pre-nuptial rituals. Matthew Dillon argues that as there were three different age categories for competitors, the ceremonies were unlikely to be associated with marriage. On the other hand, the races were associated with a mythological wedding, and other races between girls in ancient Greece (such as a footrace in honour of Dionysos held at Sparta, also described by Pausanias) seem to have been associated with pre-nuptial initiations.
