= Bosco Littorio =

Archaeological site in Gela, Italy

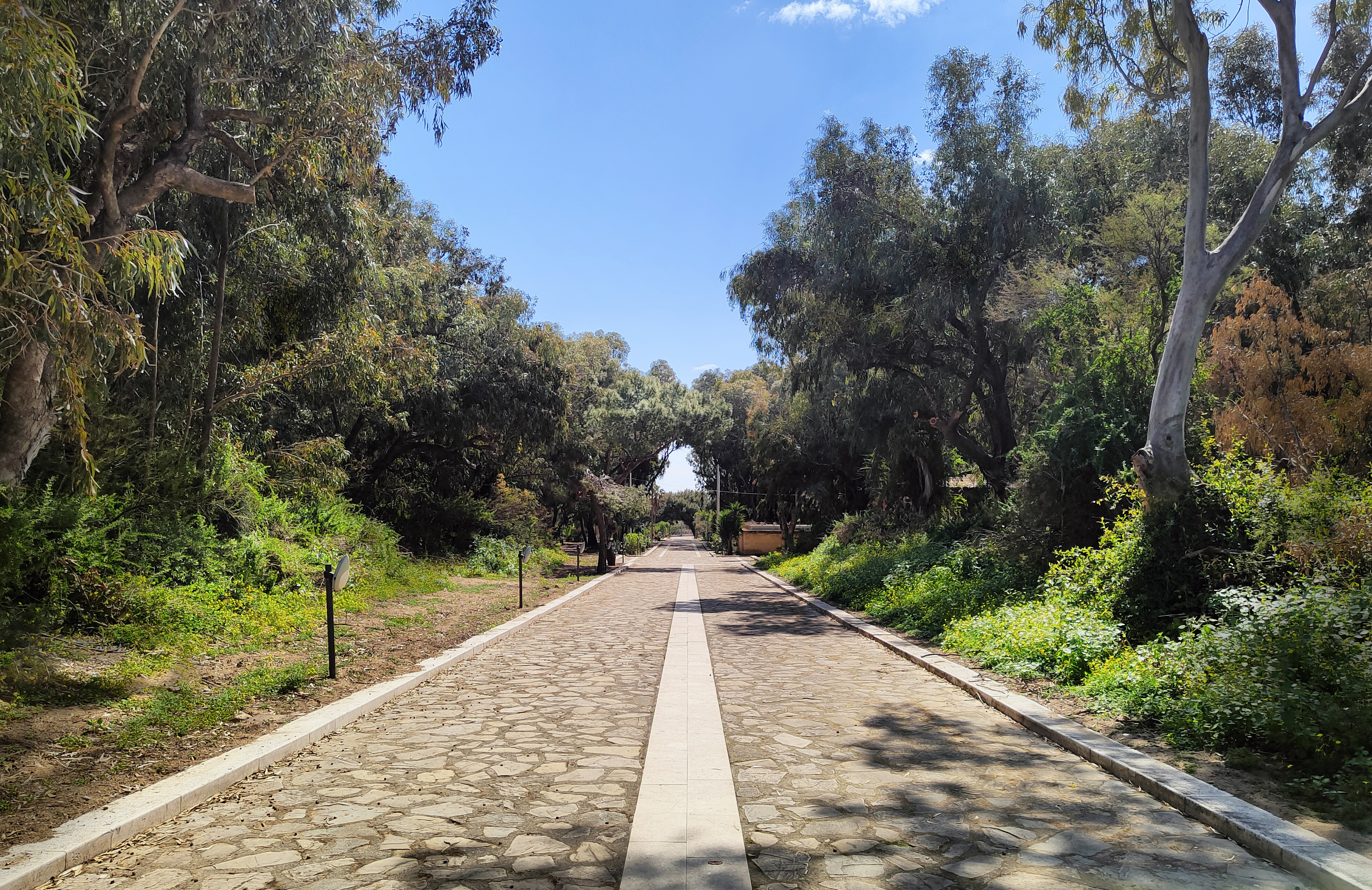
- Entrance avenue

- Location within Sicily
- 37°3′42.43″N 14°15′16.93″E
- Type: Emporium
- Periods: 8th – 5th century BC
- Cultures: Ancient Greece
- Location: Gela, Caltanissetta, Sicily, Italy
- Region: Sicily

Site notes
- Excavation dates: 1983
- Management: Soprintendenza di Caltanissetta
- Public access: yes

Bosco Littorio is a sandy area with dense vegetation located at the foot of the acropolis of Gela, on the Sicilian coast of the comune of the same name. The site contains the archaeological remains of a 7th century BC archaic emporium and the Museo dei Relitti Greci, where the greek ships of Gela and their cargo are preserved.

== History ==
After the arrival of greek colonists in 689 BC, this area became the site of an important emporium: its strategic location, a short distance from the sea and the mouth of the Gela River, made it suitable for numerous commercial exchanges, as evidenced by archaeological finds. The area was abruptly abandoned at the beginning of the 5th century BC, perhaps due to a natural event, and over the centuries it gradually became covered with sand and vegetation.

Until the end of the 19th century, the area was occupied by wells for water supply and underwent a total conversion in 1927, during the Fascist regime, when it was planted with trees and renamed "Bosco Littorio", which means "Lictorial Wood" and refers to the fasces.

In 1983, archaeological excavations brought the emporium to light and since 1992 the area has been under the control of the Superintendency of Caltanissetta. The archaeological area was opened to the public on 29 May 2009.

== Archaic emporium ==
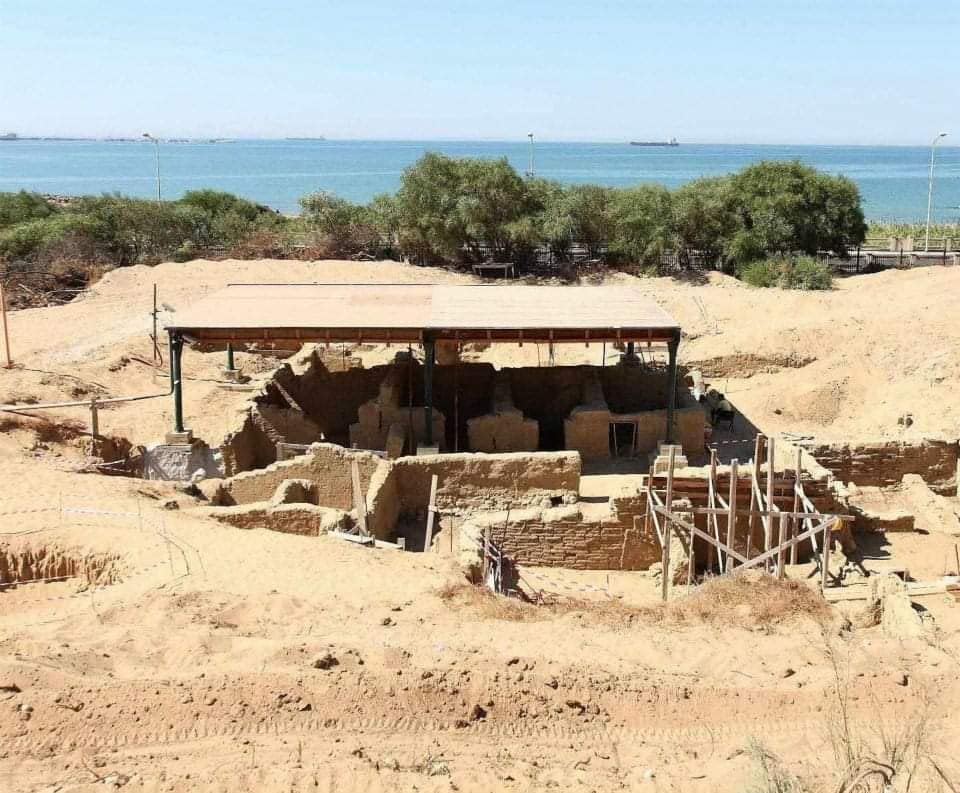
Excavation of the ancient emporium

The emporium contains more than ten structures of regular square rooms. The walls survive to a height of more than 2 metres and in some cases preserve the ancient holes for the roof beams. In many cases, the layers of plaster which covered the interior walls are also preserved. In one of the structures, an entire door is preserved, including jambs and architrave. The walls were built of rough sundried mudbricks, probably mass-produced since almost all of them have the same measurements (60 x 60 x 15 cm).

The first phase of activity in this area is datable to the time of the Greek colony's foundation in the 8th century BC. The site developed in the 6th century, until its destruction after 480 BC, probably from natural causes. The destruction might have been caused by a tsunami: traces of a traumatic event are clear from the collapsed walls of some of the houses. Over the remains of the archaic area is evidence for a final phase of life, characterised by the celebration of feasts which probably had a religious dimension.

In December 1999, during some excavations under the direction of Rosalba Panvini, three terracotta altars were discovered, dating to the 480s BC and decorated with reliefs of mythological figures: the gorgon Medusa with her children Pegasus and Chrysaor under her arms on one, the goddess Eos kidnaping Cephalus, and a triad of female figures. The altars are on display in the Regional Archaeological Museum of Gela.

During a three-day expedition, Traffici, commerci e vie di distribuzione nel Mediterraneo tra protostoria e V secolo a.C. (27–29 May 2009), the site was opened to the workers and their families and then to the wider public; it remains freely accessible today.

== Museo dei Relitti Greci ==
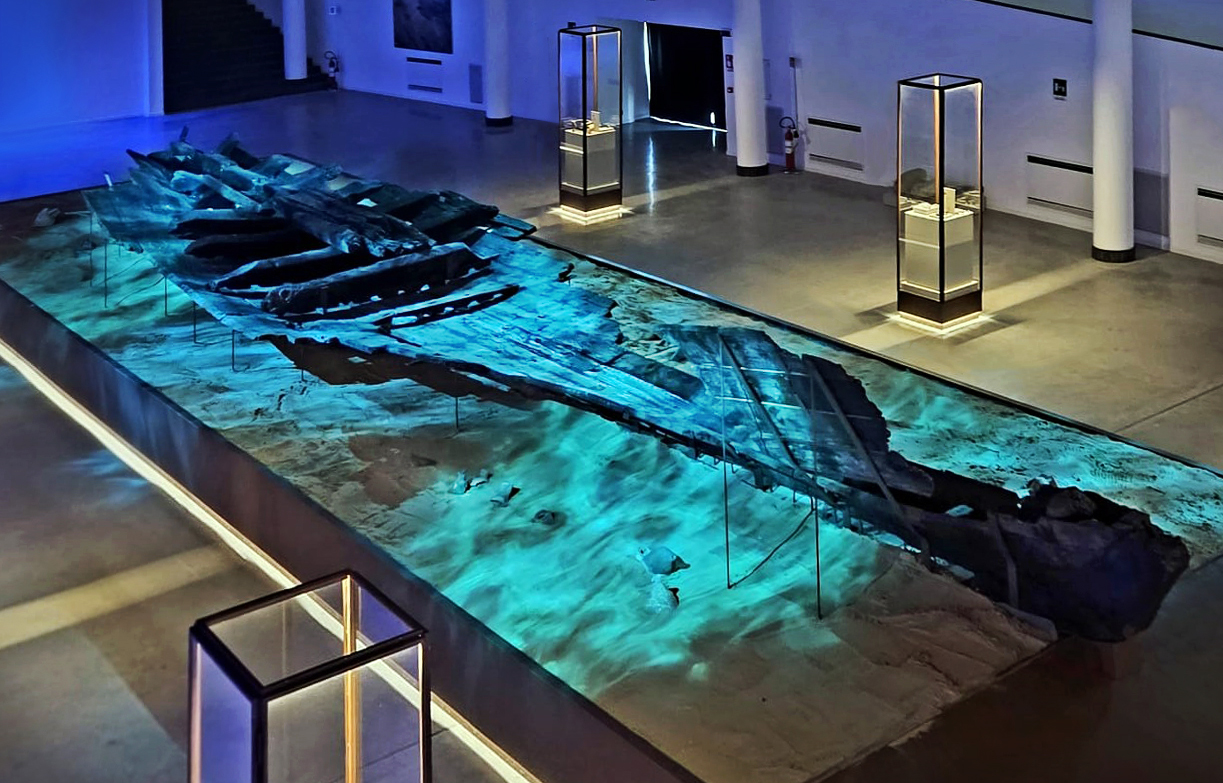
The Greek Shipwreck inside the museum

The Museo dei Relitti Greci (Greek Shipwreck Museum) is a museum inaugurated on 24 February 2026, to house three shipwrecks of Greek merchant ships dating back to the 6th–5th century BC, making them the oldest ever found.

The building, with an exhibition area of 4000 m², was built in 2021 on the remains of an old INAPLI building in the park. Inside, visitors can also find their cargo (including, among other objects, rare orichalcum ingots), a sensory room where they can relive the ships' journey, and an area dedicated to virtual reality.

== Bibliography ==
- R. Panvini; F. Giudice, Ta Attika: veder greco a Gela: ceramiche attiche figurate dall'antica colonia, Roma 2003
- R. Pavini, Les autels archaïque de Géla. Une découverte exceptionelle en Sicile. Musèe du Louvre, Salle de Diane (25 septembre-17 décembre 2001), Caltanissetta 2001
