= Gorgons =

Female monsters in Greek mythology

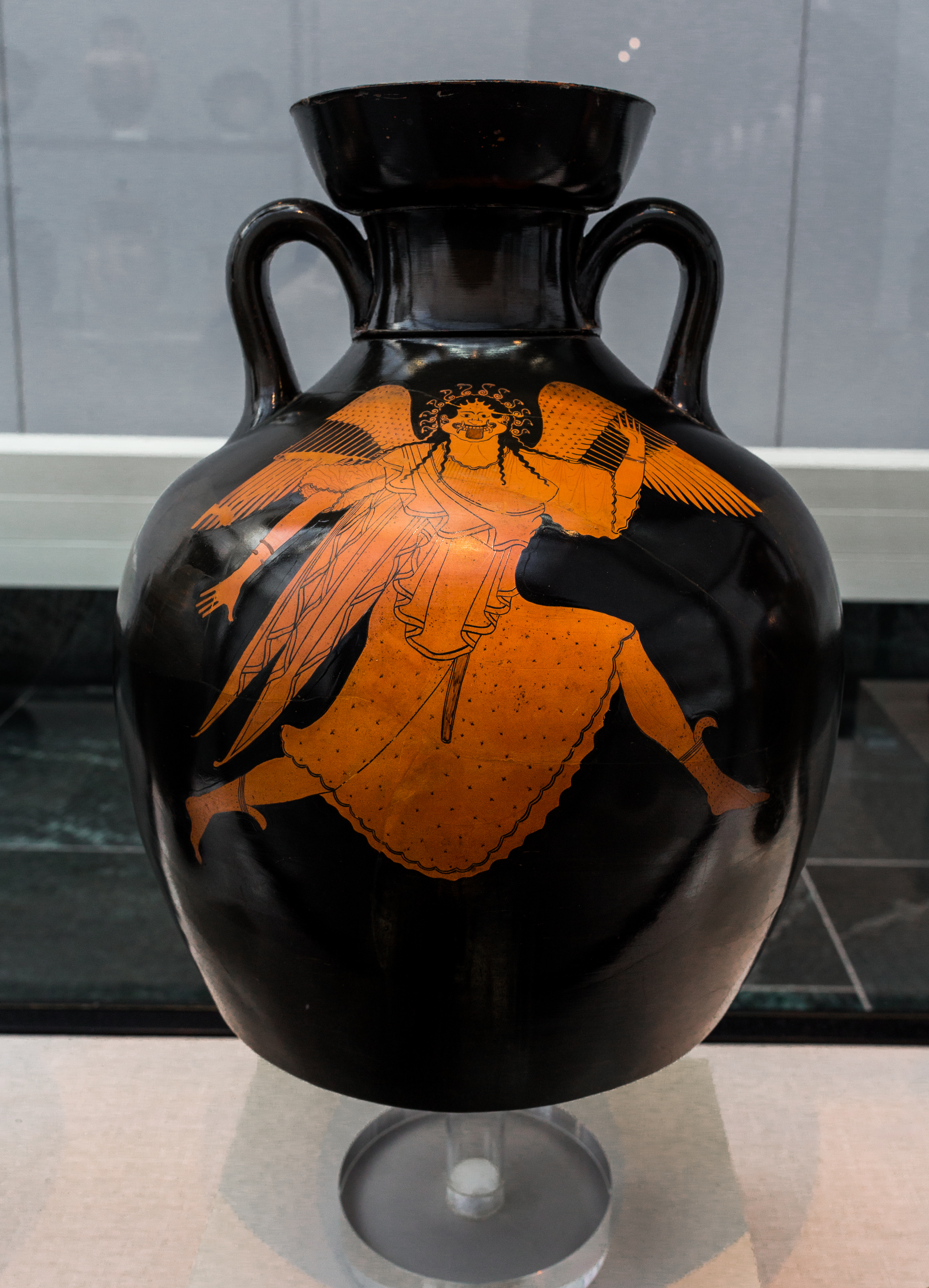
Running Gorgon; amphora, Munich, Staatliche Antikensammlungen 2312 (c. 490 BC)

The Gorgons (/ˈɡɔːrɡənz/ GOR-gənz; Ancient Greek: Γοργόνες), in Greek mythology, are three monstrous sisters, Stheno, Euryale, and Medusa, said to be the daughters of Phorcys and Ceto. They lived near their sisters, the Graeae, and were able to turn anyone who looked at them to stone. Euryale and Stheno were immortal, but Medusa was not and was slain by the hero Perseus.

Gorgons were dread monsters with terrifying eyes. A Gorgon head was displayed on Athena's aegis, giving it the power both to protect her from any weapon, and instill great fear in any enemy. Gorgon blood was said to have both the power to heal and harm.

Representations of full-bodied Gorgons and the Gorgon face, called a gorgoneion (pl. gorgoneia), were popular subjects in Ancient Greek, Etruscan and Roman iconography. While Archaic Gorgons and gorgoneia are universally depicted as hideously ugly, over time they came to be portrayed as beautiful young women.

== Etymology ==
The name 'Gorgon' (also 'Gorgō' and 'Gorgonē') is associated with the Ancient Greek adjective gorgós (γοργός), which, of an eye or look, means 'grim, fierce, awesome, dazzling', It is considered to be related to the Sanskrit stem garğ. The stem has connotations of noise, and Germanic and Romance languages have many derivatives from this stem referring to the throat (e.g. 'gorge') or the guttural sounds produced in the throat (e.g. 'gargle', 'gurgle'). It has been understood as meaning to growl, roar or howl, while Thalia Feldman suggests that the closest meaning for the stem might be the onomatopoeic grrr of a growling beast.

== Family ==
According to Hesiod and Apollodorus, the Gorgons were daughters of the primordial sea-god Phorcys and the sea-monster Ceto, and the sisters of three other daughters of Phorcys and Ceto, the Graeae. However, according to Hyginus, they were daughters of "the Gorgon", an offspring of Typhon and Echidna, and Ceto, while Euripides, in his tragedy Ion, has "the Gorgon" being an offspring of Gaia, spawned by Gaia to be an ally for her children the Giants in their war against the Olympian gods. Medusa had two offspring by Poseidon: the winged horse Pegasus and the warrior Chrysaor.

== Mythology ==
=== Dwelling place ===
Where the Gorgons were supposed to live varies in the ancient sources. According to Hesiod, the Gorgons lived far to the west beyond Oceanus (the Titan, and world-circling river) near its springs, at the edge of night where the Hesperides (and the Graeae?) live. The Cypria apparently had the Gorgons living in Oceanus on a rocky island named Sarpedon. Aeschylus's Prometheus Bound places them in the far east "across the surging sea" on the "Gorgonean plains of Cisthene", where the Graeae live, while his lost play Phorkides (another name for the Graeae) apparently placed them at "Lake Tritonis", a mythological lake set somewhere in westernmost North Africa. And the fifth-century BC poet Pindar has Perseus, apparently on his quest for the Gorgon head, visit the Hyperboreans (usually considered to dwell in the far north). However, whether Pindar means to imply that the Gorgons lived near the Hyperboreans is unclear.

=== Petrification ===
Pherecydes notes that Medusa's face turned men to stone, and Pindar describes Medusa's severed head as "stony death". In Prometheus Bound, it says that no mortal can look at them and live. According to Apollodorus, all three of the Gorgons could turn to stone anyone who saw them.

=== Perseus ===
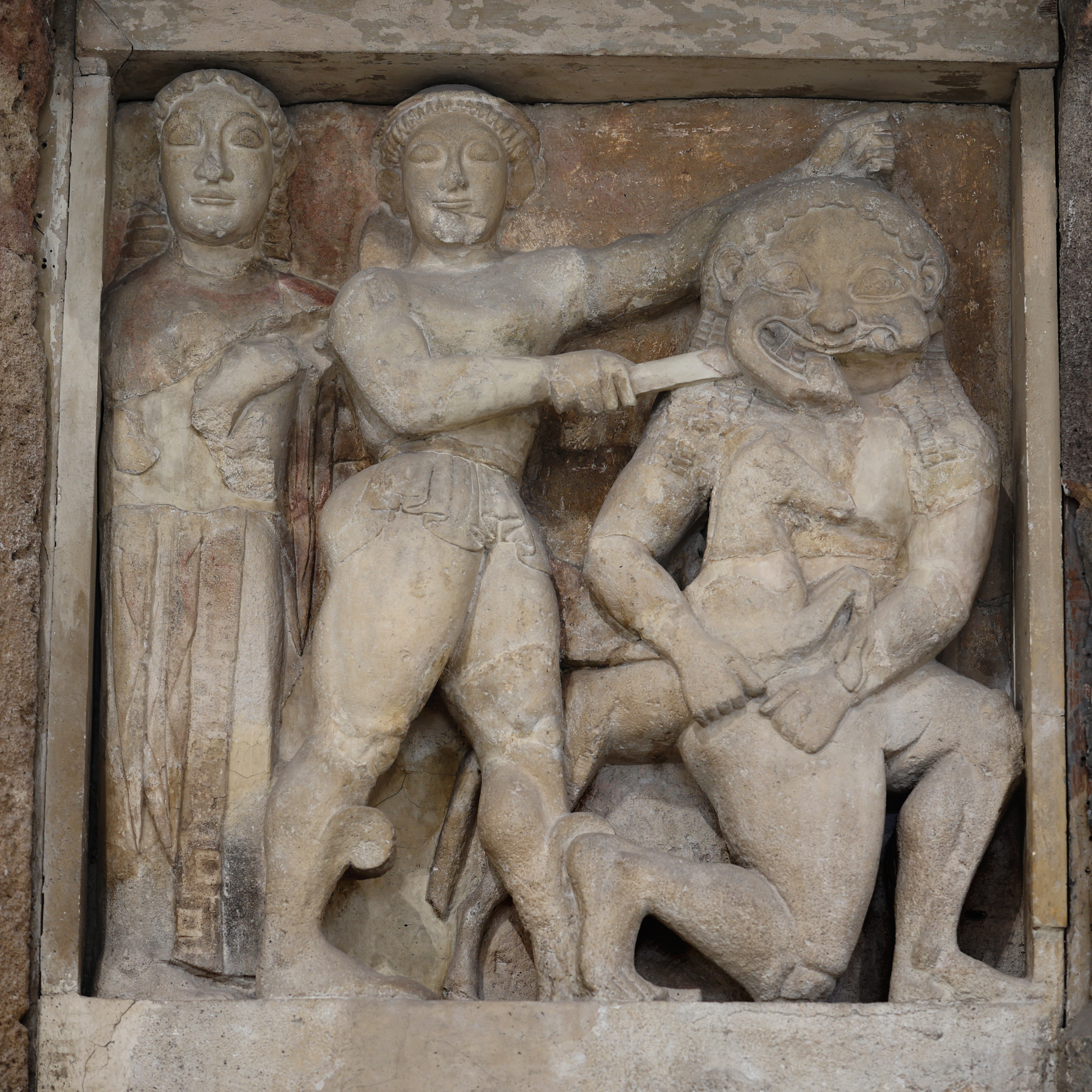
Perseus beheading Medusa; Metope from Temple C at Selinus, Antonino Salinas Regional Archaeological Museum 3920 B (sixth century BC)

Stheno and Euryale were immortal, whereas Medusa was mortal. According to Apollodorus' version of their story, Perseus was ordered by Polydectes (his enemy) to bring back the head of Medusa. So, guided by Hermes and Athena, he sought out the sisters of the Gorgons, the Graeae, who had only one eye and one tooth, which they shared. Perseus managed to steal their eye and tooth, and refused to return them, unless they would show him the way to the nymphs, which they did. Perseus got from the nymphs winged sandals, which allowed him to fly, and the cap of Hades, which made him invisible. He also received an adamantine sickle (harpē) from Hermes. Perseus then flew to Oceanus, where he found the Gorgons asleep. When Perseus managed to behead Medusa by looking at her reflection in his bronze shield, Pegasus and Chrysaor sprang from Medusa's neck, and Stheno and Euryale chased after him, but were unable to see him because he was wearing Hades' cap of invisibility. When Perseus brought back the Gorgon head, as ordered, he showed the head to Polydectes, who was turned to stone. Perseus returned the things he had acquired from the nymphs and Hermes, but gave the Gorgon head to Athena.

=== Athena's Gorgon aegis ===
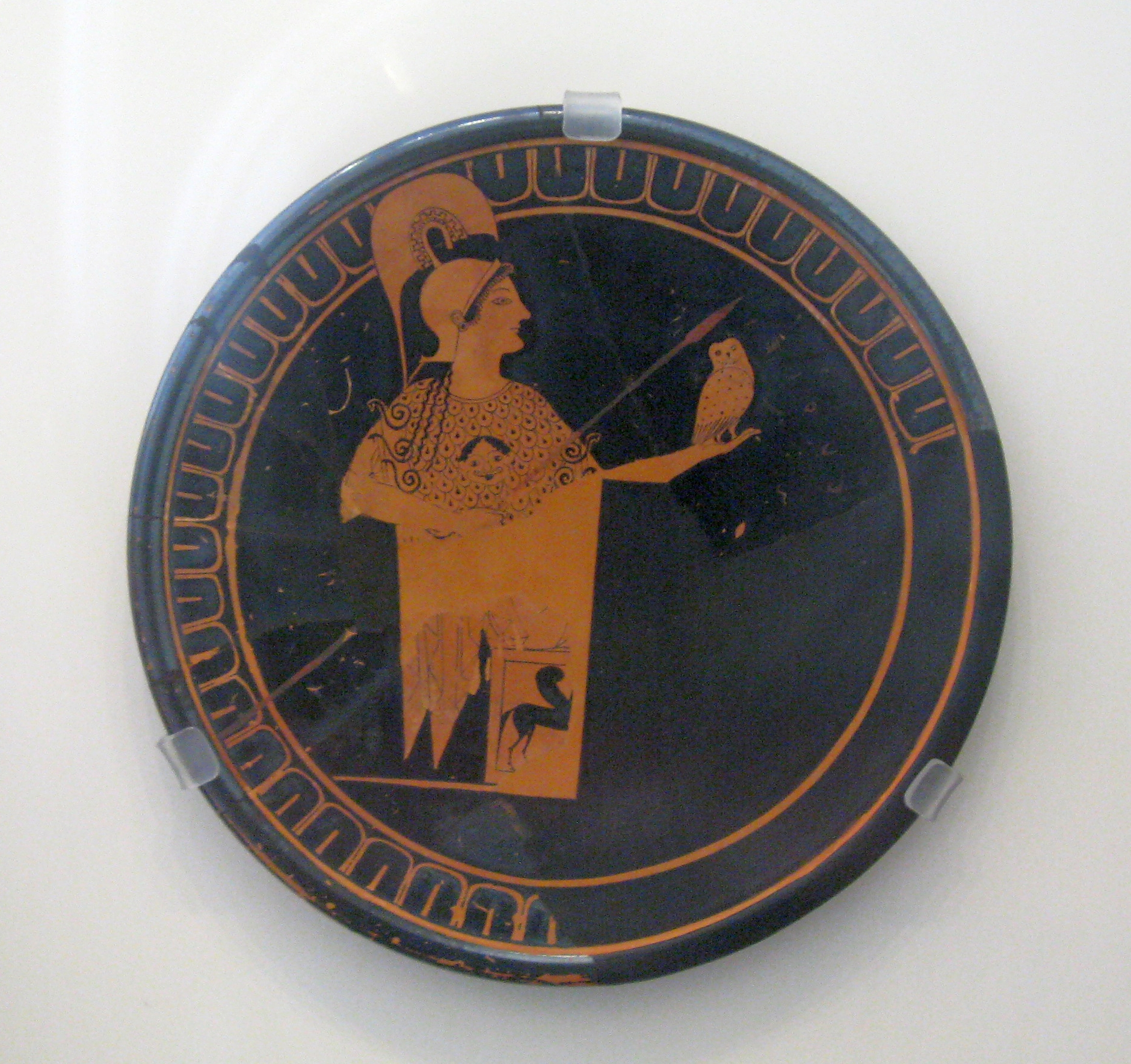
Athena wearing her snake-fringed Gorgon aegis; plate attributed to Oltos, Munich, Staatliche Antikensammlungen F2313 (c. 525–475 BC)

According to Apollodorus, after Perseus gave the Gorgon head to Athena, she "inserted the Gorgon's head in the middle of her shield", apparently a reference to Athena's aegis. In the Iliad, the aegis is a device, usually associated with Athena, which was decorated with a Gorgon head. Athena wore it in battle as a shield which neither Apollo's spear, or even Zeus' thunderbolt could pierce. According to the Iliad, Hephaestus made the aegis for Zeus, while according to a Hesiod fragment, Metis made it for Athena, before Athena was born.

However, Euripides, in his tragedy Ion, has a character say that Athena's aegis was made from the skin of "the Gorgon", an offspring of Gaia, who Gaia had brought forth as an ally for her children the Giants and who Athena had killed during the Gigantomachy. In the same play, Euripides has Creusa describe a weaving she made "like an aegis, bordered with serpents" with a "Gorgon in the middle". He also mentions Athena's "Gorgon-faced shield" in his tragedy Electra.

In vase-painting, Athena is often shown wearing her aegis, fringed with snake-heads.

=== Gorgon blood ===
In some accounts, the blood of "the Gorgon" (any Gorgon?) was said to have both the power to heal and harm. According to Euripides' Ion, Athena gave two drops of blood from the Gorgon she slew for her aegis to Erichthonius, one of which "wards off diseases and nourishes life", while the other "kills, as it is poison from the Gorgon serpents". While according to Apollodorus, Athena gave Asclepius some of the blood the Gorgon, "and while he used the blood that flowed from the veins on the left side for the bane of mankind, he used the blood that flowed from the right side for salvation, and by that means he raised the dead."

=== Gorgon cry ===
The loud cry that came from the Gorgons—perhaps related to 'Gorgon' being derived from the Sanskrit garğ, with its connotations of a growling beast—was also part of their mythology.

The Hesiodic Shield of Heracles (c. late seventh–mid-sixth century BC), which describes Heracles' shield, has the Gorgons depicted on it chasing Perseus, with their shrill cry seemingly being heard emanating from the shield itself:

The Gorgons, dreadful and unspeakable, were rushing after him, eager to catch him; as they ran on the pallid adamant, the shield resounded sharply and piercingly with a loud noise.

Pindar tells us that the cry of the Gorgons, lamenting the death of Medusa during their pursuit of Perseus, was the reason Athena invented the flute. According to Pindar, the goddess:

wove into music the dire dirge of the reckless Gorgons which Perseus heard pouring in slow anguish from beneath the horrible snakey hair of the maidens ... she created the many-voiced song of flutes so that she could imitate with musical instruments the shrill cry that reached her ears from the fast-moving jaws of Euryale.

Nonnus, in his Dionysiaca, also has the fleeing Perseus "listening for no trumpet but Euryale's bellowing". The desire to evoke this Gorgon cry may account for the typical distended mouth seen in Archaic Gorgon iconography.

== Literary descriptions ==
The earliest literary accounts of Gorgons occur in works by Hesiod and Homer (c. 700–650 BC). Hesiod provides no physical description of the Gorgons, other than to say that the two Gorgons, Sthenno, and Euryale did not grow old. Homer mentions only "the Gorgon" (otherwise unnamed) giving brief descriptions of her, and her head. In the Iliad she is called a "dread monster" and the image of her head, which appears—along with several other terrifying images—on Athena's aegis, and Agamemnon's shield, is described as "dread and awful", and "grim of aspect, glaring terribly". Already in the Iliad, the Gorgon's "glaring" eyes were a notably fearsome feature. As Hector pursues the fleeing Achaeans, "exulting in his might" ... ever slaying the hindmost", Homer describes the Trojan hero as having eyes like "the eyes of the Gorgon". And in the Odyssey, Odysseus, although determined "steadfastly" to stay in the underworld, so as to meet other great men among the dead, is seized by such fear at the mere thought that he might encounter there the "head of the Gorgon, that awful monster", leaves "straightway".

The Hesiodic Shield describes the Gorgons chasing Perseus as being "dreadful and unspeakable" with two snakes wrapped around their waists, and that "upon the terrible heads of the Gorgons rioted great Fear", perhaps a reference to snakes writhing about their heads. Pindar makes snakes for hair explicit, saying that Perseus' Gorgon head "shimmered with hair made of serpents", and that the Gorgons chasing Perseus also had "horrible snaky hair", so too in Prometheus Bound where all three Gorgons are described as "winged" as well as "snake-haired". The Gorgon's reputation for ugliness was such that the Athenian comic playwright Aristophones could, in 405 BC, ridicule the women of the Athenian deme Teithras by referring to them as Gorgons.

The mythographer Apollodorus gives the most detailed description:

... the Gorgons had heads twined about with the scales of dragons, and great tusks like swine's, and brazen hands, and golden wings, by which they flew".

While such descriptions emphasize the hideous physical features of the Gorgon, by the fifth century BC, Pindar can also describe his snake-haired Medusa as "beautiful". And the Roman poet Ovid tells us that Medusa was originally a beautiful maiden, but because of a sexual encounter with Neptune (the Roman equivalent of the Greek Poseidon) in Minerva's temple (Minerva being the Roman equivalent of the Greek Athena), Minerva punished Medusa by transforming her beautiful hair into horrible snakes.

== Iconography ==
Gorgons were a popular subject in ancient Greek, Etruscan and Roman art, with over six hundred representations cataloged in the Lexicon Iconographicum Mythologiae Classicae (LIMC). In addition to the many examples found on vase paintings, Gorgons occur in a wide variety of other contexts, including architectural ornamentation, shield devices, and coins. Some representations show full-bodied Gorgons, while others, called gorgoneia, show only the face (or head) of a Gorgon, such as those described in the Iliad as appearing on Athena's aegis, and Agamemnon's shield. The earliest representations of both types are found from roughly the same time period, the mid-seventh century BC.

Archaic Gorgons typically have snaky hair either with snake-like curls (Figs. 8, 9), or actual snakes protruding from their heads (Figs. 2, 5, 6, 10). The faces of Archaic Gorgons are particularly distinctive, typically with large menacing eyes, tripartite or scroll-like (volute) noses, wide mouths with rictus-like grins or grimaces, lolling tongues, fangs and/or tusks (Figs. 4, 5, 9, 10), and sometimes beards (Figs. 3, 4, 14, 17). Aside from its particular monstrousness, the most distinctive feature of archaic representations of Gorgons is that the head is always facing frontally (en face) with its large fierce eyes glaring directly at the viewer.

Consistent with the change in literary descriptions seen in the works of Pindar and Ovid mentioned above, beginning in the fifth century BC, representations of Gorgons and gorgoneia transition from hideous monsters to beautiful young women, with such representations becoming typical in the fourth century BC. One of the earliest such "beautiful" Gorgons (mid-fifth century BC) is a red-figure pelike (Fig. 11), which shows Perseus, with head turned away, about to behead a sleeping Medusa. While gorgoneia continue to be ubiquitous through the end of antiquity, after the fourth century BC full-bodied Gorgons ceased to be represented.

=== Full-bodied Gorgons ===
Full-bodied Gorgons are usually shown in connection with the Perseus-Medusa story. The earliest representations (mid-seventh century BC) of such Gorgons are a Boeotian relief pithos (Fig. 1), which depicts Perseus, with head turned away, decapitating a Gorgon, and the Eleusis Amphora (Fig. 2), which shows two Gorgons chasing Perseus fleeing with a severed Gorgon head. That the Perseus on the pithos averts his gaze shows that already in these earliest images it was understood that looking directly at the Gorgon's face was deadly. Of particular interest is the famous Medusa pediment (early sixth century BC) from the temple of Artemis in Corfu (Fig. 6), which shows a winged-Medusa in the characteristic Knielauf (kneeling-running) position, with two snakes wrapped around her waist, like the Gorgons described in the Hesiodic Shield of Heracles.

Although the Gorgon being beheaded on the Boeotian pithos is depicted as a female centaur, with neither wings nor snakes present, and the Gorgons on the Eleusis Amphora, have wingless, wasp-shaped bodies with cauldron-like heads, by the end of the seventh century BC, humanoid bodies, with wings, and snakes around their head, necks, or waist, such as depicted on the Medusa pediment, become typical. Unlike the depictions of gods and heroes, which are usually shown in profile, Archaic Gorgons, even when their bodies are presented in profile (usually running), their heads are (as noted above) always turned frontally displaying their full face, directly gazing at the viewer.

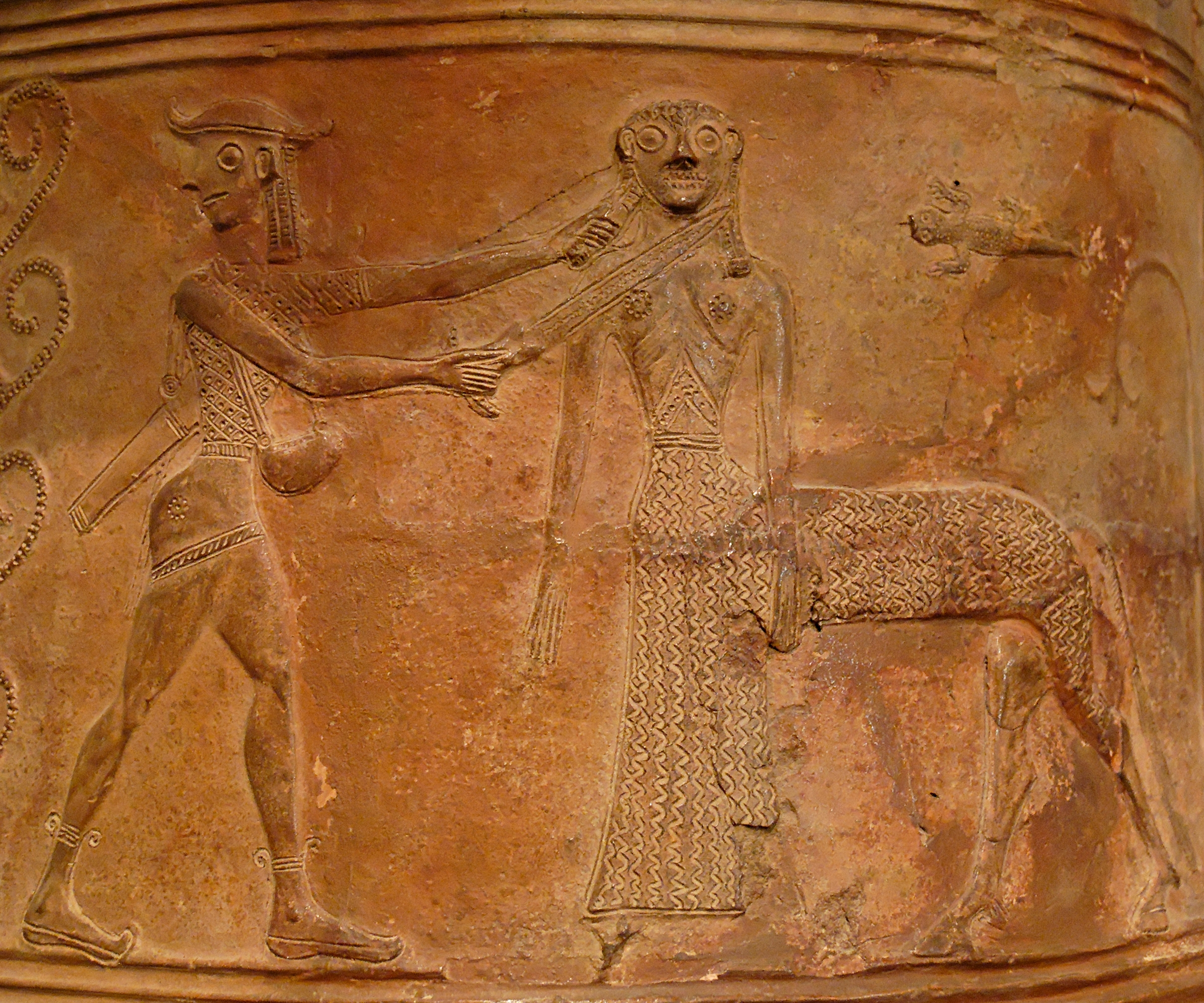
Fig. 1. Horse-bodied Gorgon (Medusa) being decapitated by Perseus with averted gaze; Boetian relief pithos, Louvre CA 795 (mid-seventh century BC)

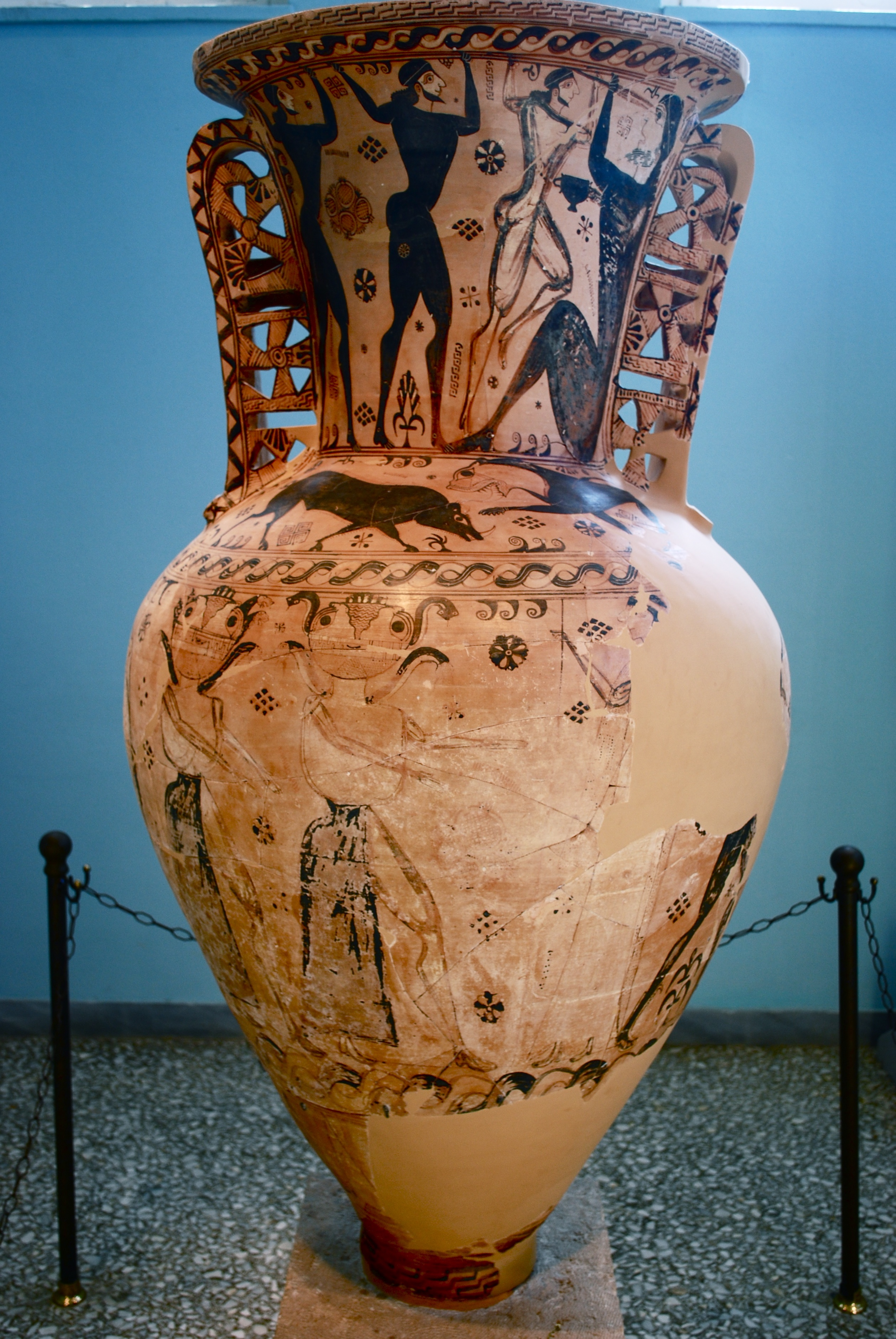
Fig. 2. Two wingless cauldron-headed Gorgons with wasp-shaped bodies chase Perseus (on the body of the vase below the neck); Eleusis Amphora, Eleusis, Archaeological Museum 2630 (mid-seventh century BC)

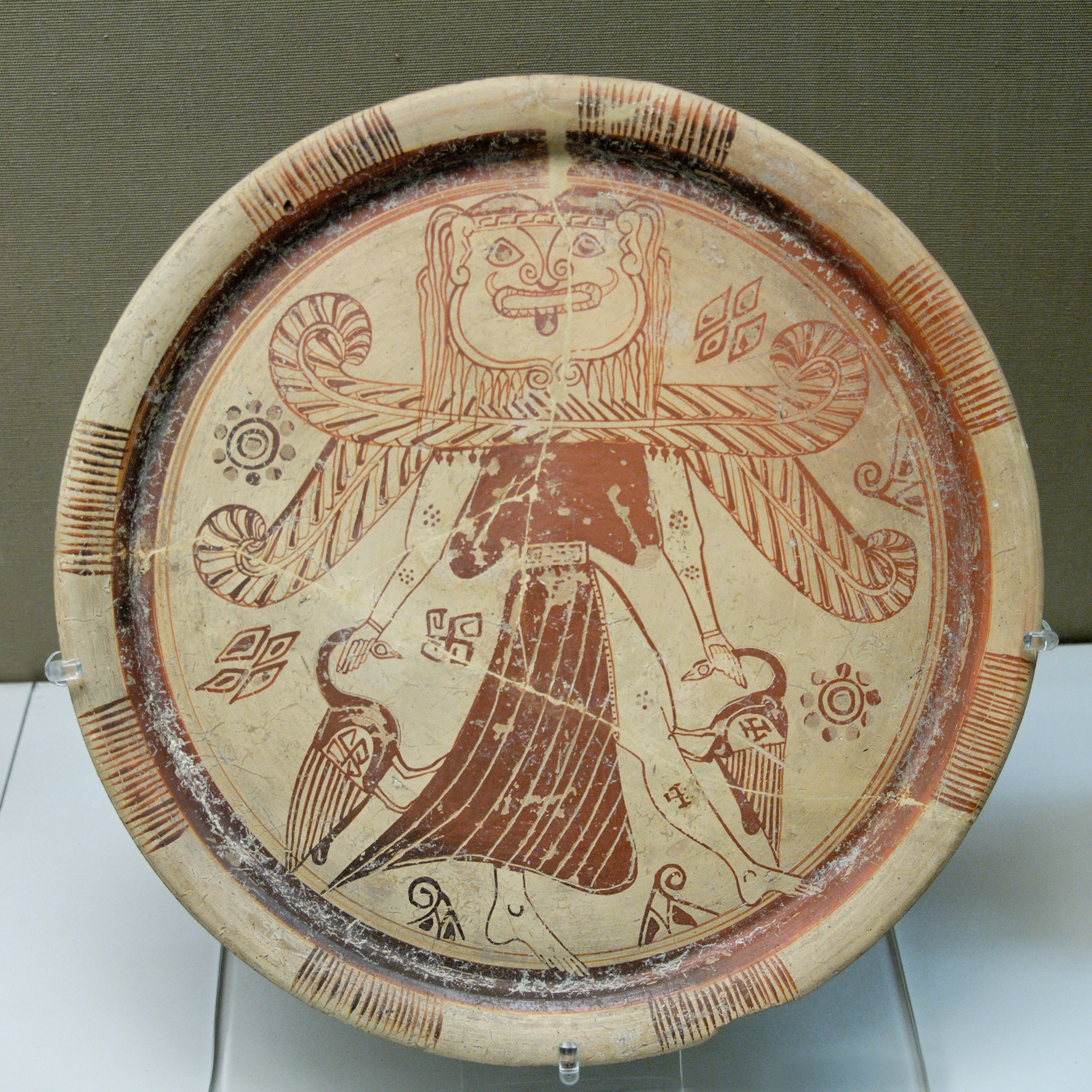
Fig. 3. Winged Gorgon with volute nose, wide mouth, tusks/fangs, tongue, and beard, as Mistress of Animals flanked by geese; plate from Kameiros, Rhodes, British Museum A 748 (late seventh century BC)

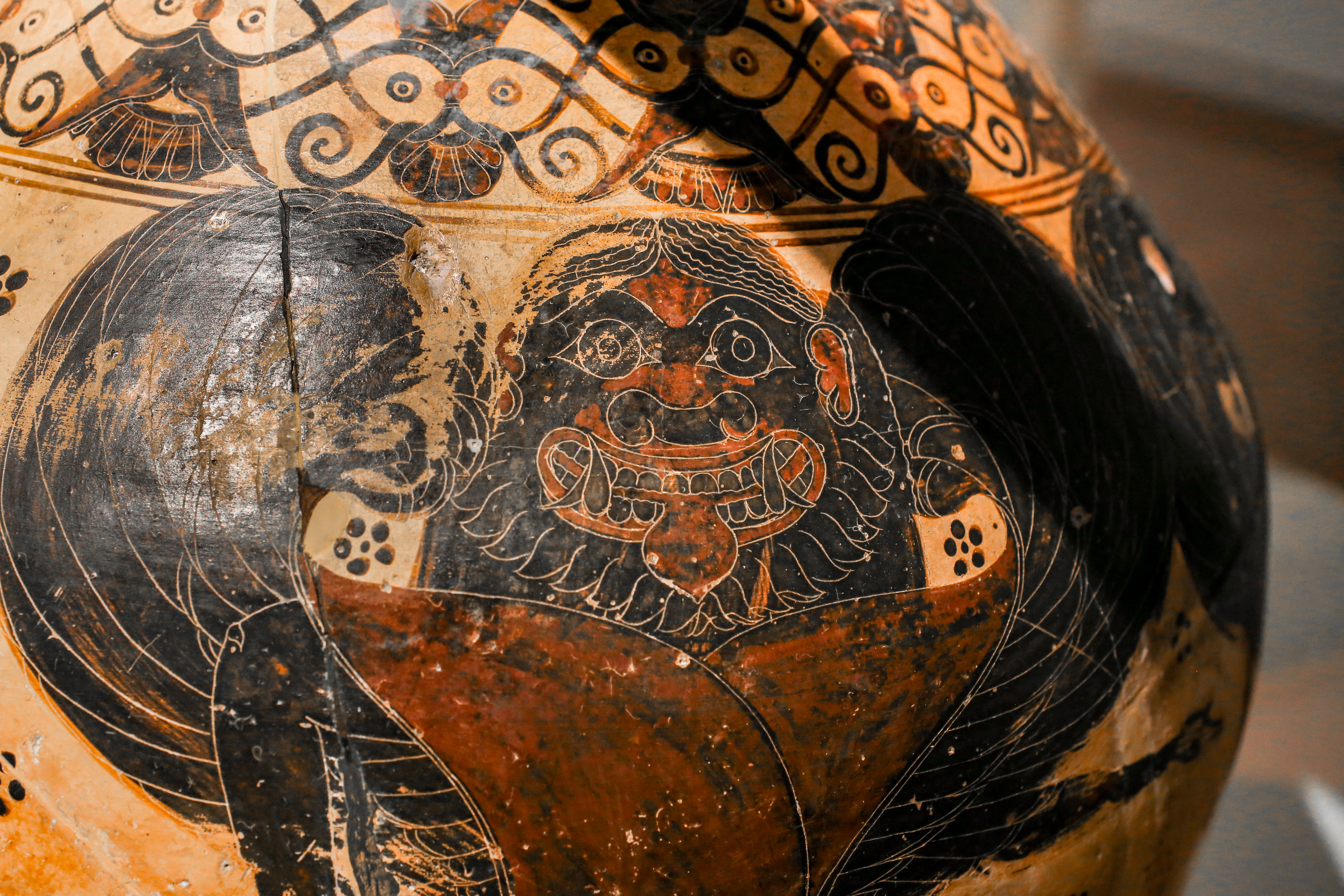
Fig. 4. Winged Gorgon with volute nose, wide mouth, tusks/fangs, tongue, and beard; name vase of the Nessos Painter, Athens, National Archaeological Museum 1002 (late seventh–early sixth century BC)

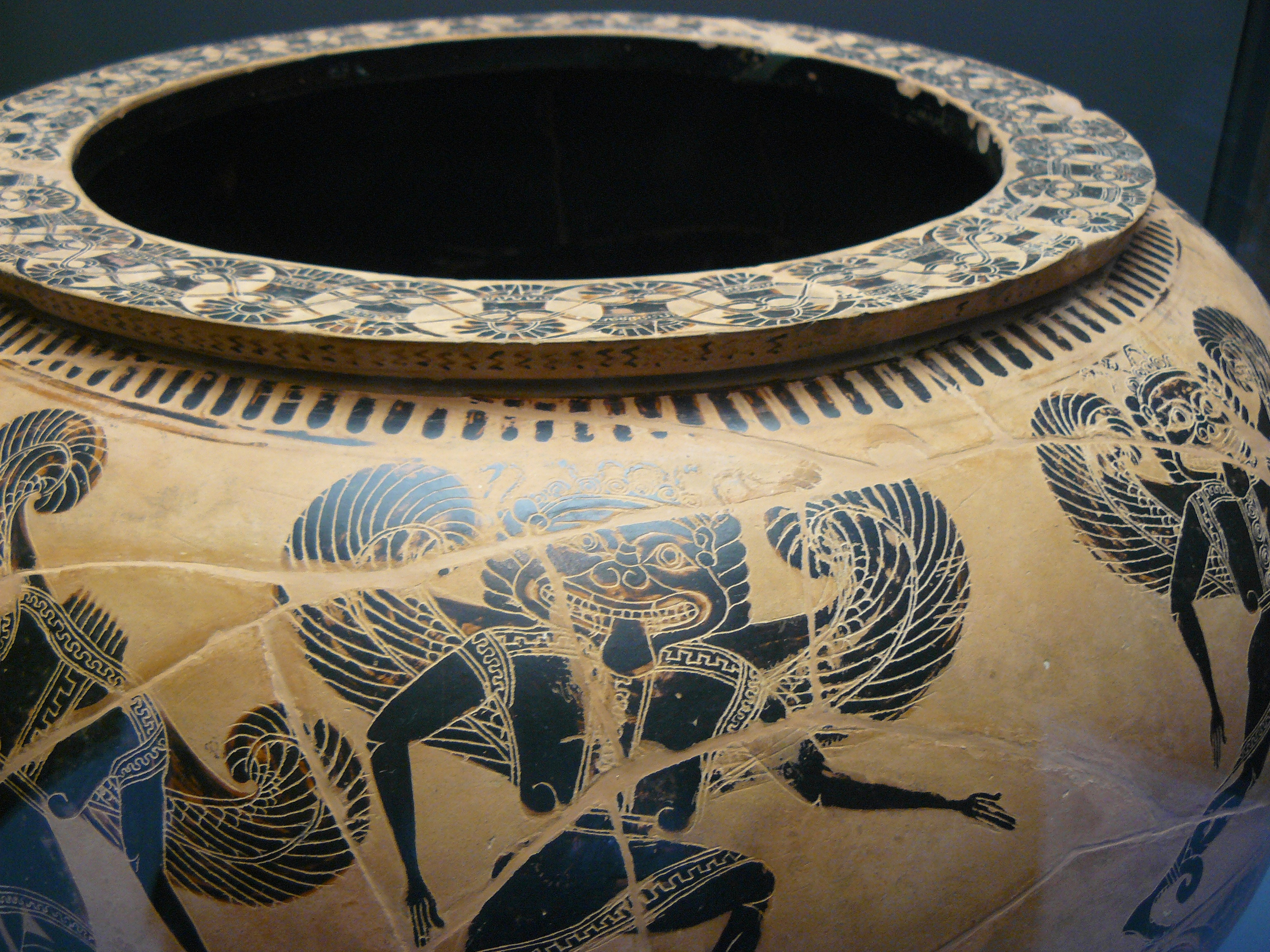
Fig. 5. Two winged snake-haired Gorgons with volute nose, wide mouth, tusks/fangs, tongue (center and right) chase Perseus, with a headless Gorgon (left); Dinos of the Gorgon Painter, Louvre E874 (early sixth century BC)

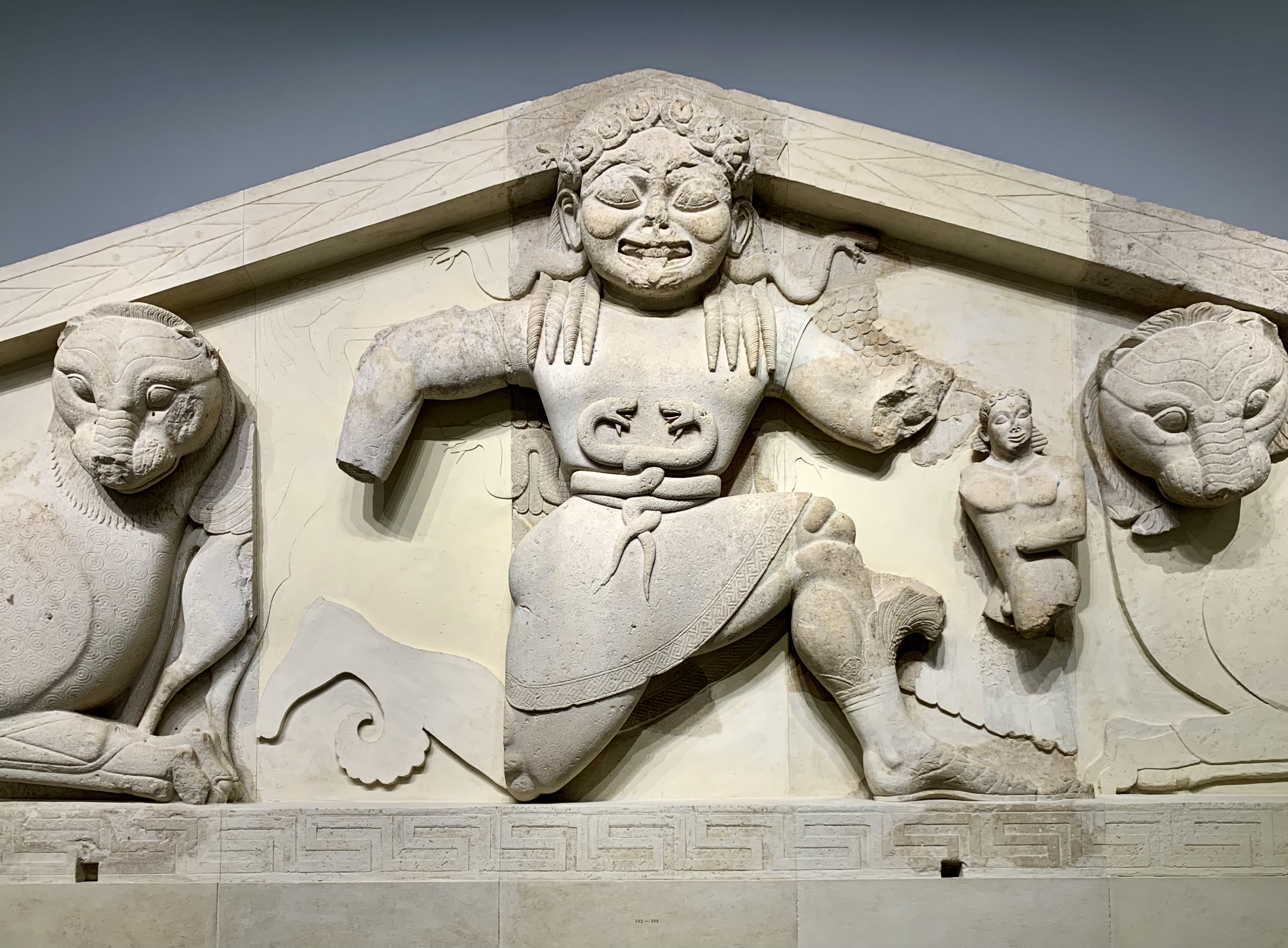
Fig. 6. Winged snake-haired Gorgon (Medusa) with belt of snakes, in kneeling-running position, with her offspring Pegasus (left) and Chrysaor (right) at her side, and flanked in Mistress of Animals style by a pair of lions; pediment from the temple of Artemis in Corfu, Archaeological Museum of Corfu (early sixth century BC)

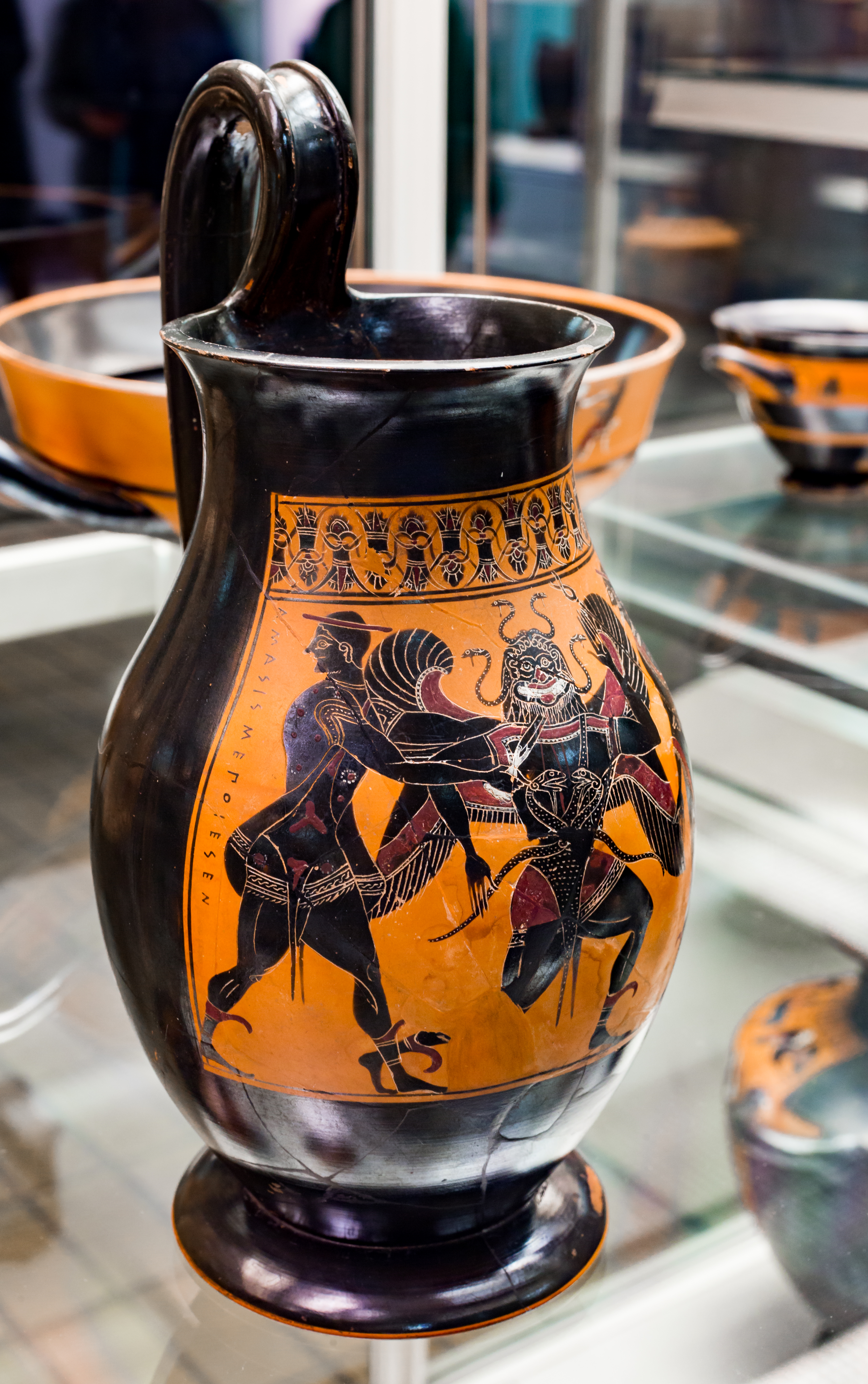
Fig. 7 Perseus, with head turned away, decapitates Medusa with Hermes on the right; olpe (pitcher) by the Amasis Painter, British Museum B 471 (mid-sixth century BC).

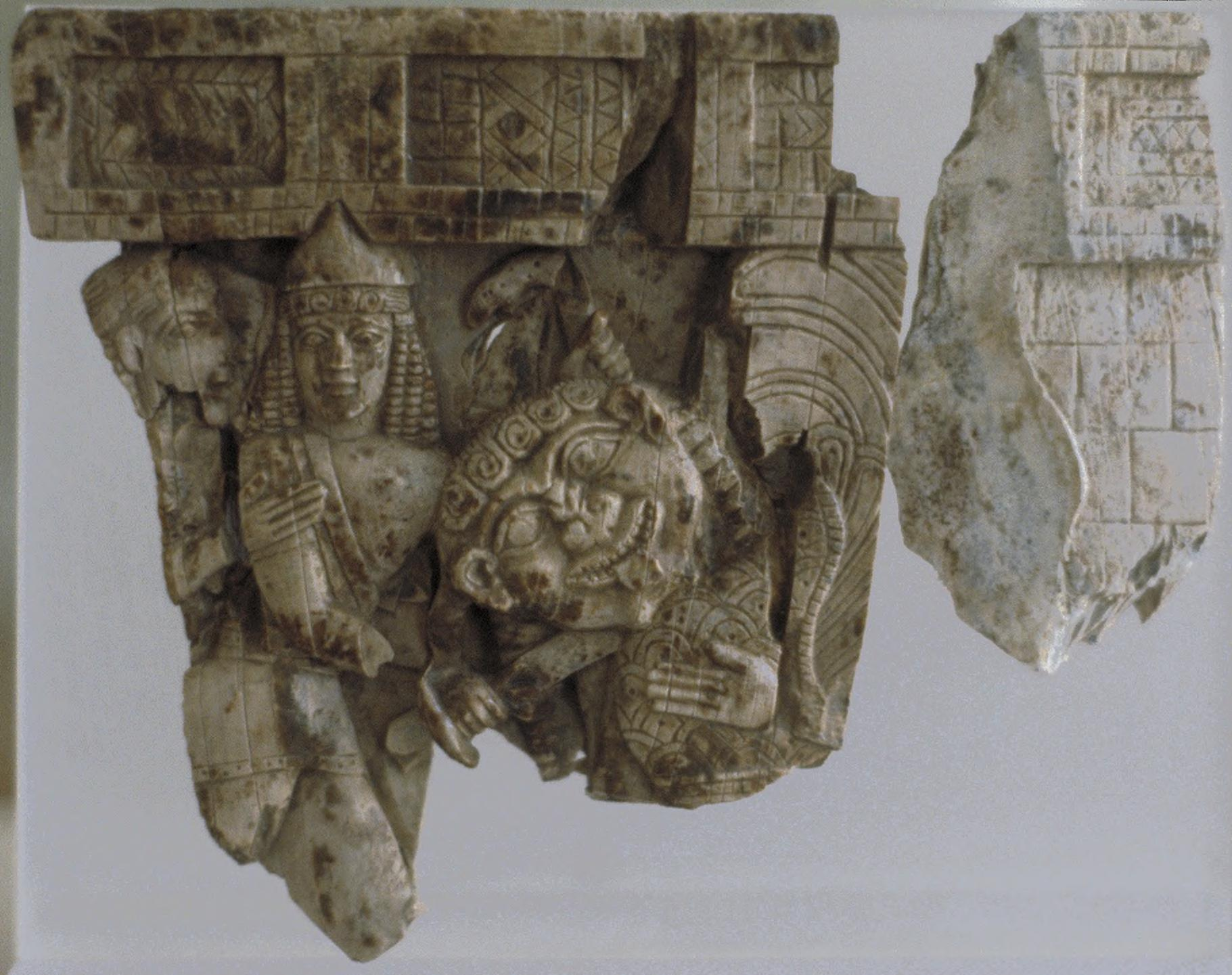
Fig. 8. Winged curl-haired Gorgon (Medusa) being decapitated by Perseus aided by Athena; fragment of ivory relief plaque from the Heraion of Samos Archaeological Museum of Samos E 1 (sixth century BC)

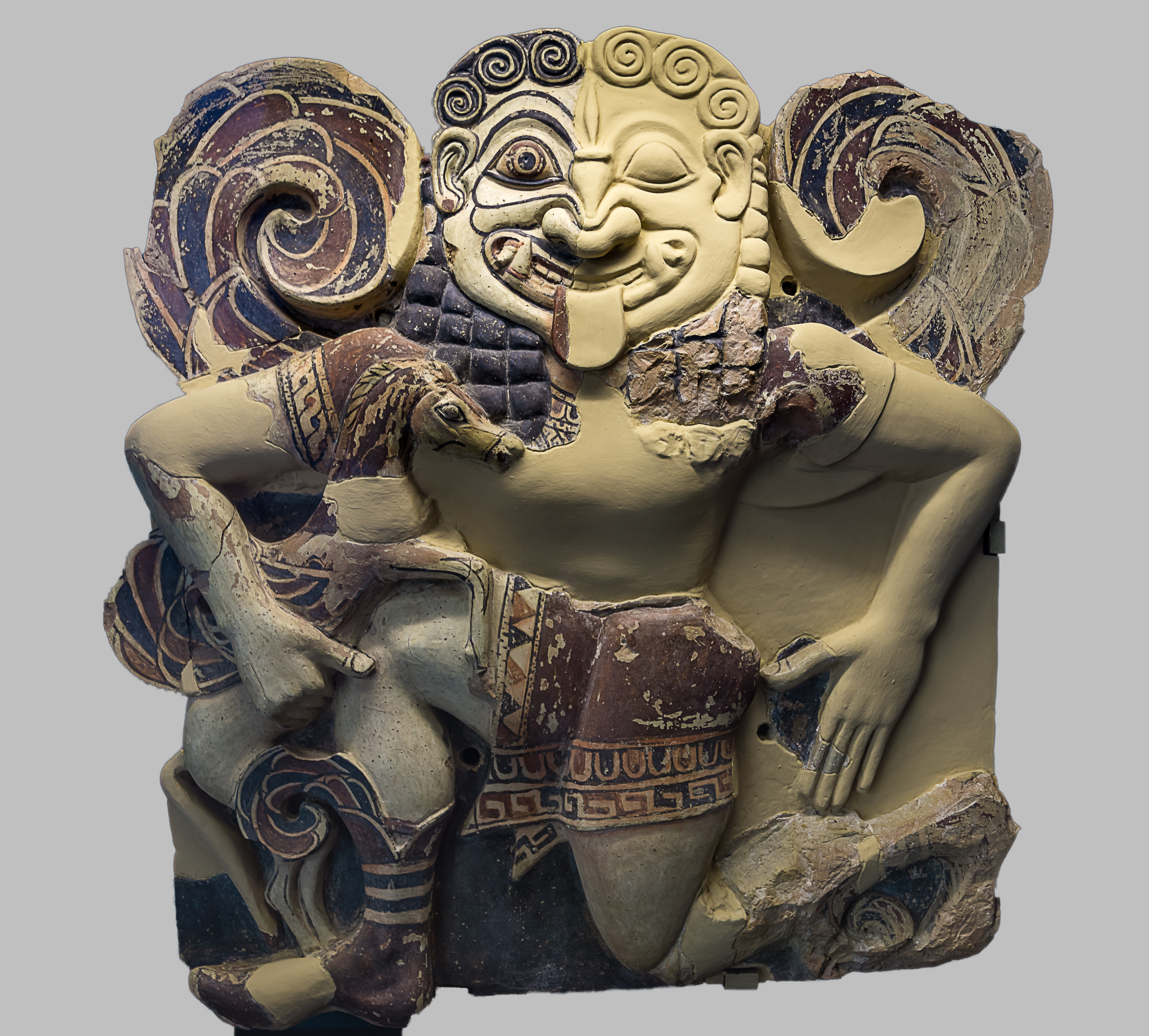
Fig. 9. Winged curl-haired Gorgon (Medusa) holding Pegasus; relief terracotta antefix, Temple of Athena at Syracuse, in the Museo Archeologico Regionale Paolo Orsi of Syracuse, Sicily (late sixth century BC)

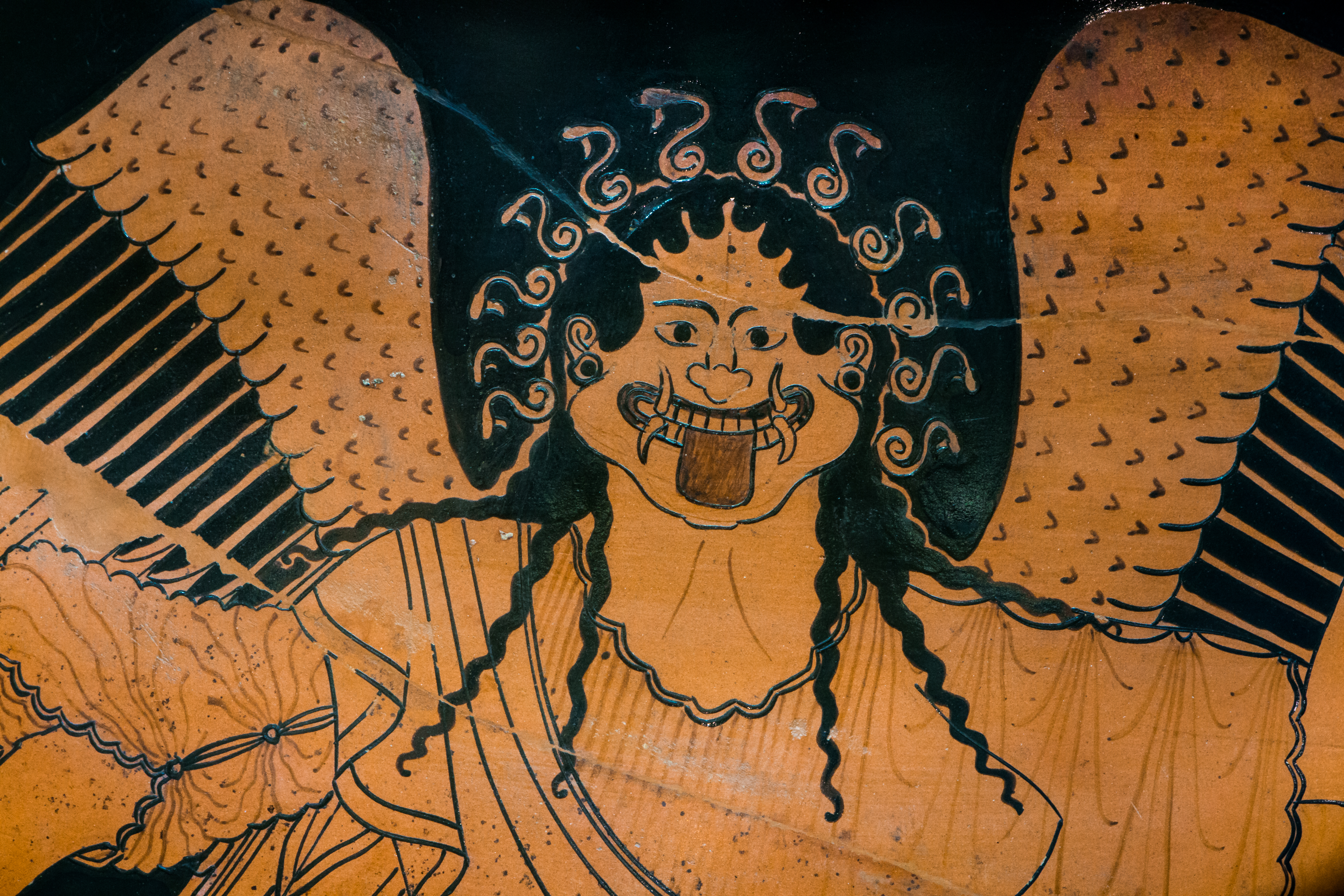
Fig. 10. Gorgon (detail); amphora, Munich, Staatliche Antikensammlungen 2312 (Early fifth century BC)

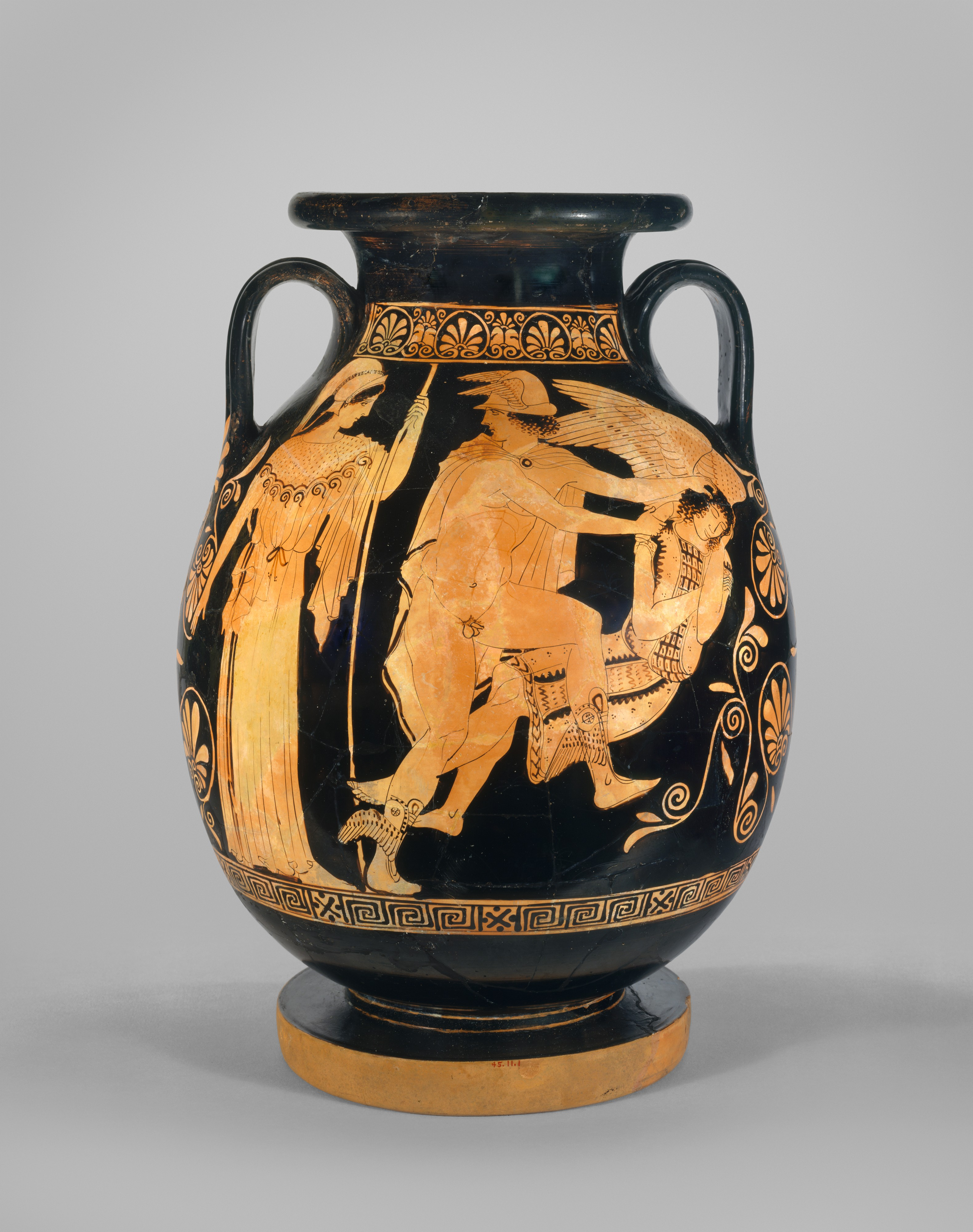
Fig. 11. Perseus about to behead a "beautiful" sleeping Medusa; Pelike, attributed to Polygnotos, Metropolitan Museum of Art 45.11.1 (mid-fifth century BC)

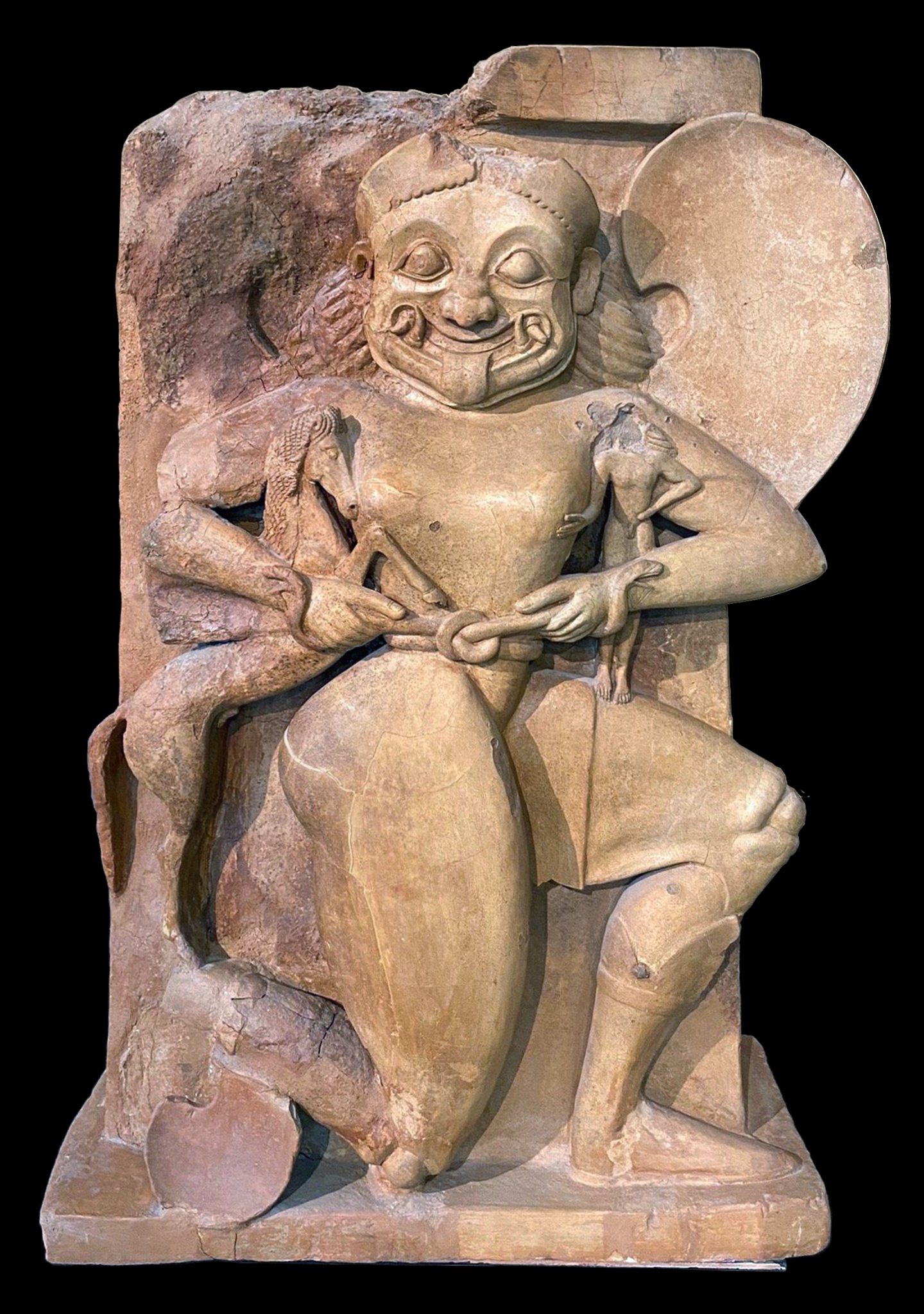
Fig. 12. Winged Gorgon (Medusa) holding Pegasus and Crysaor; terracotta altar from the archaic emporium at Gela, in the Museo Archeologico Regionale of Gela, Sicily (late fifth century BC)

=== Gorgoneia ===
Of the depictions of ancient Greek demons, the gorgoneion is, by far, the most frequently occurring. Thought to have had an apotropaic (protective) function, gorgoneia are often found on architectural elements such as temple pediments, and ornamental antefixes and acroteria, or decorating various round objects, such as shields, coins, and the bottoms of bowls and cups. As with full-bodied Gorgons the earliest representations are found from the mid-sixth century BC. The earliest example of a "beautiful" gorgoneion is the Medusa Rondanini (Fig. 21), which is thought to be a Roman copy of a Greek original dated to either the fifth-century BC or the Hellenistic period.

Athena's victory over the Giant Enceladus—with a gorgoneion on her shield—was apparently depicted on the Temple of Apollo at Delphi (latter part of the sixth century BC). In Euripides's Ion (c. 412–412 BC), the Chorus describes seeing, on the temple's stone walls, Athena "brandishing her gorgon shield" against Enceladus. Pausanias describes seeing a votive golden shield dedicated by the Spartans and their allies after the Battle of Tanagra (457 BC), with a gorgoneion (or possibly a full-bodied Gorgon) depicted in relief being displayed at the Temple of Zeus at Olympia.

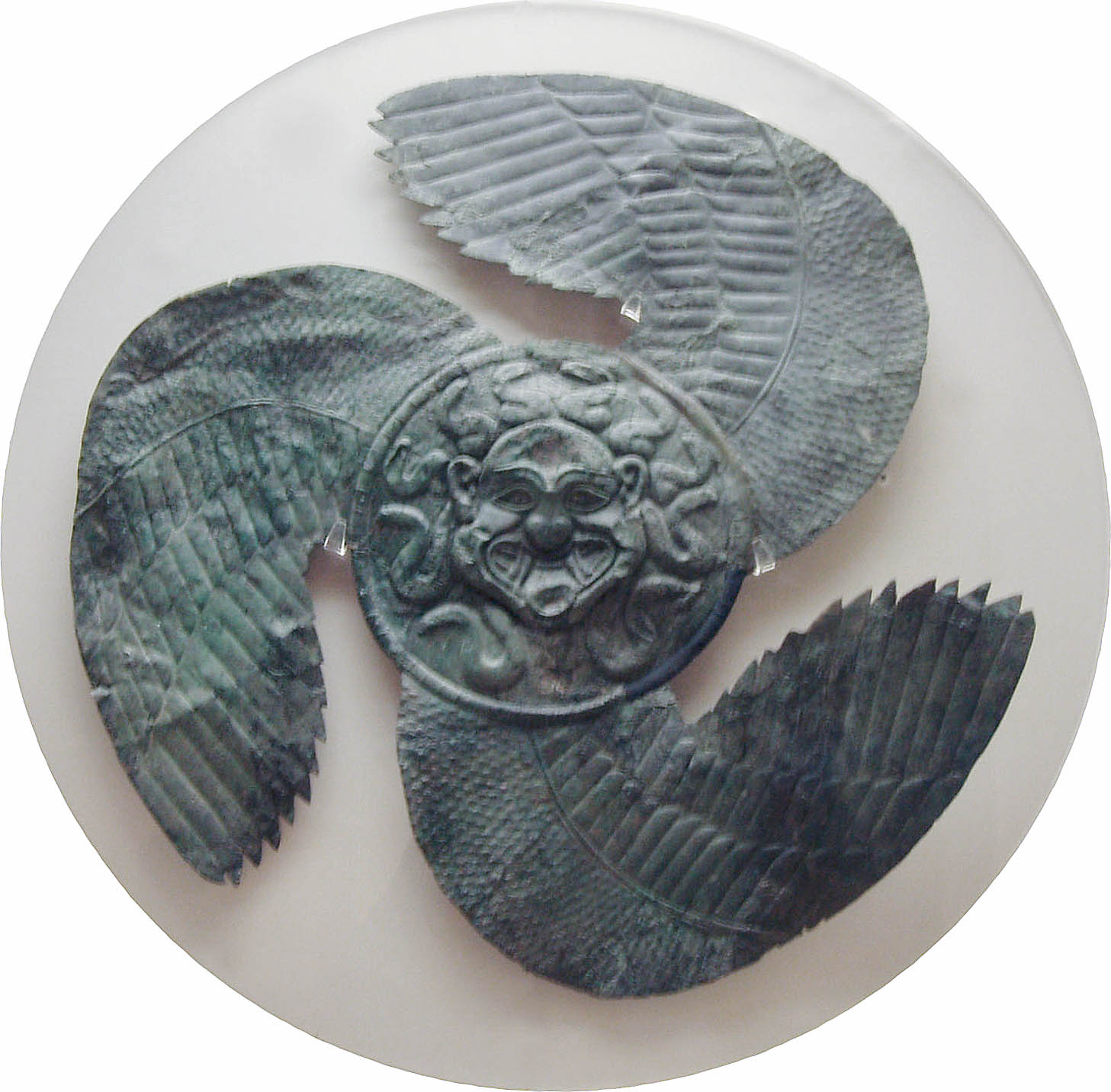
Fig. 13. Winged gorgoneion; bronze shield device from Olympia, Archaeological Museum B 110 (first half of the sixth century BC)

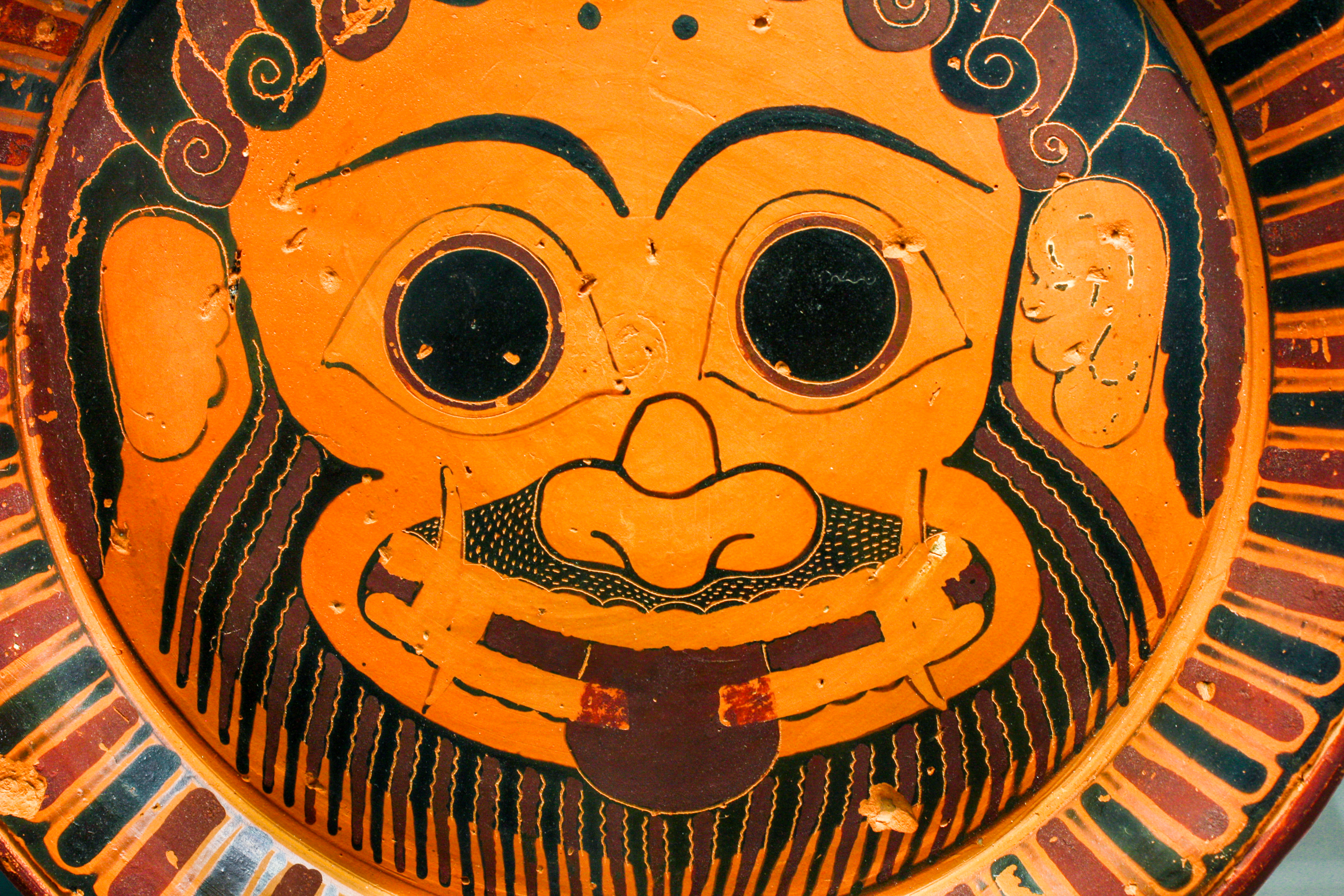
Fig. 14. Bearded gorgoneion; Attic plate by Lydos, Munich, Staatliche Antikensammlungen 8760 (mid-sixth century BC)

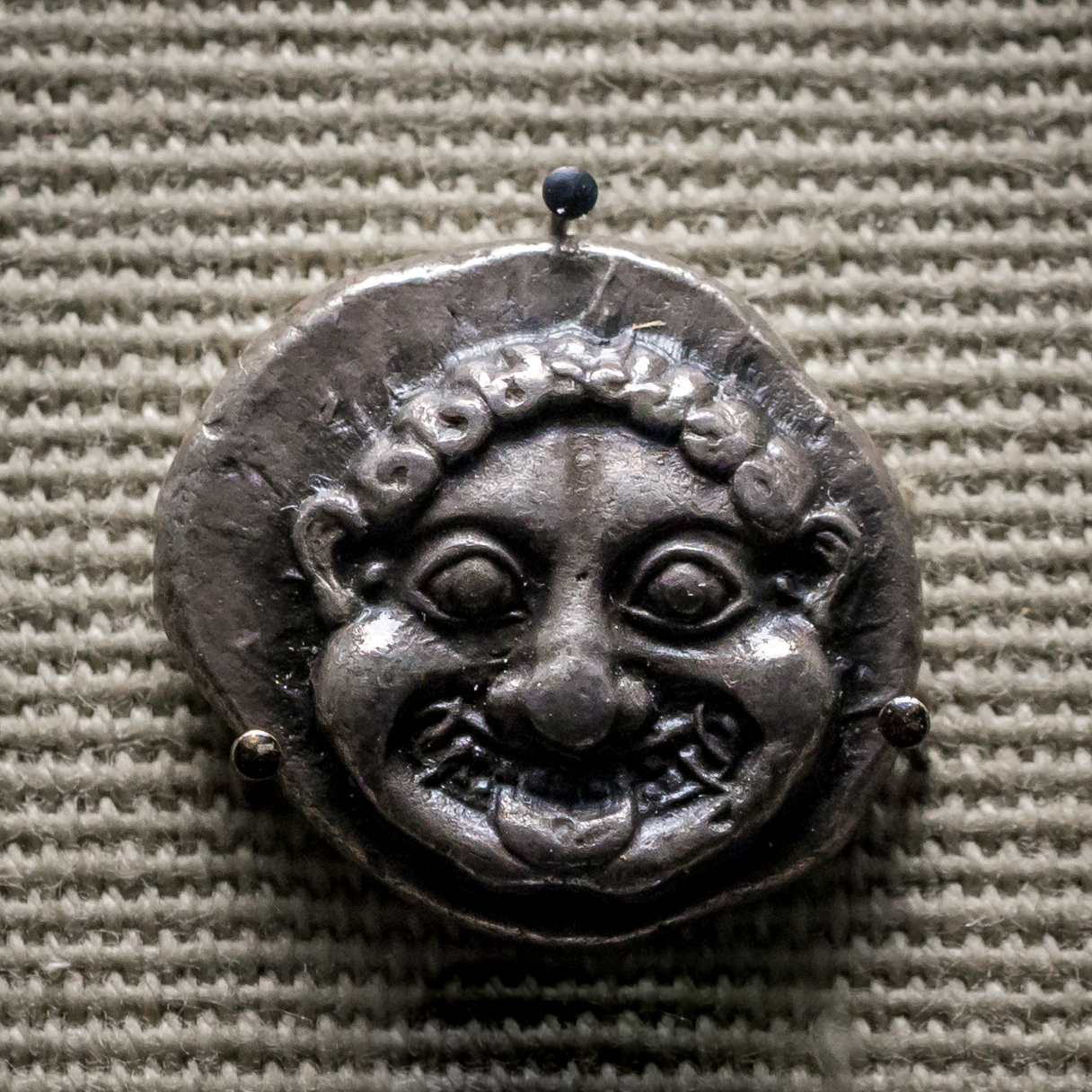
Fig. 15 Gorgoneion; silver didrachm issued by Athens (mid-late sixth century BC).

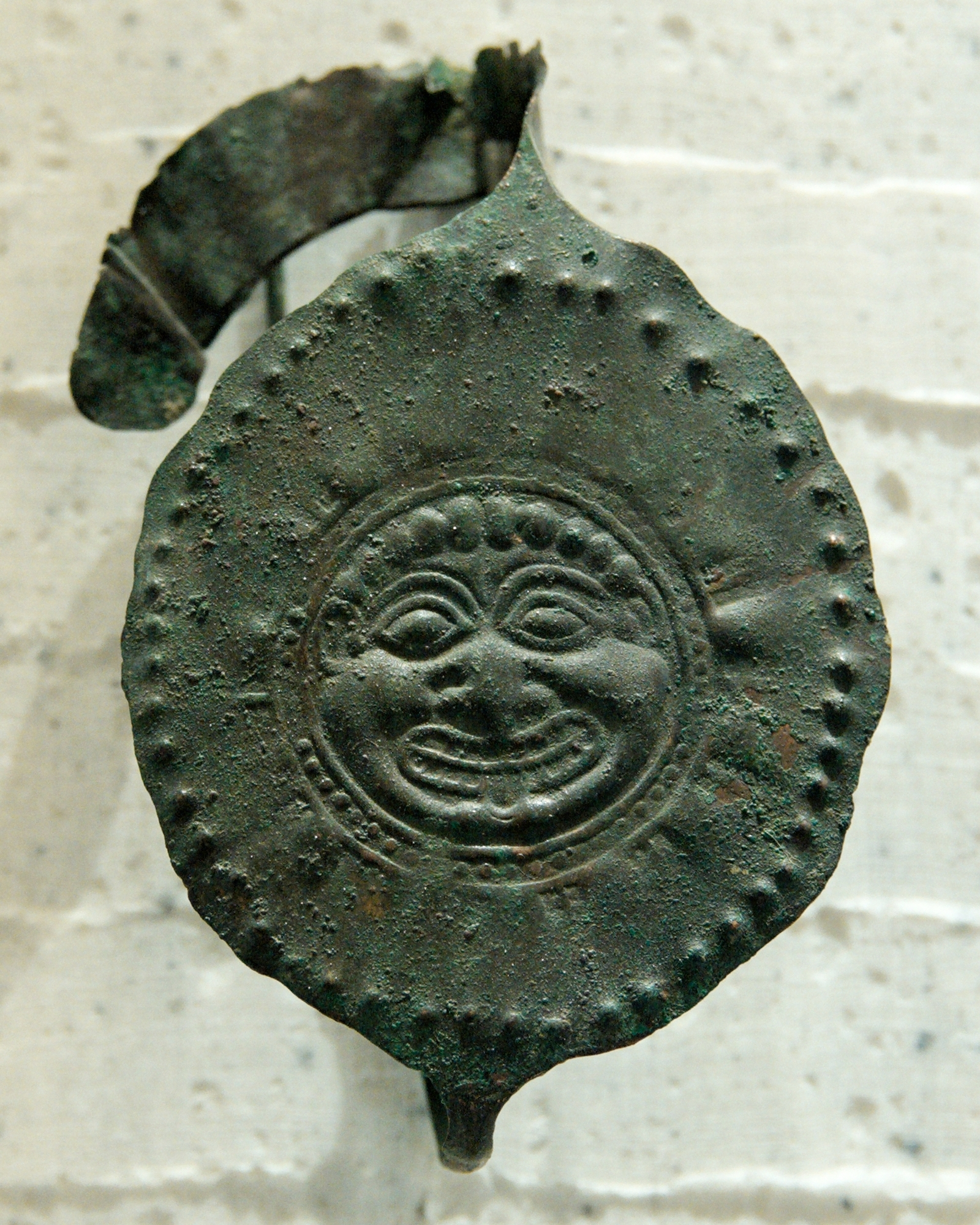
Fig. 16. Gorgoneion; Disk-fibula, Louvre BR 4306 (second half of the sixth century BC)

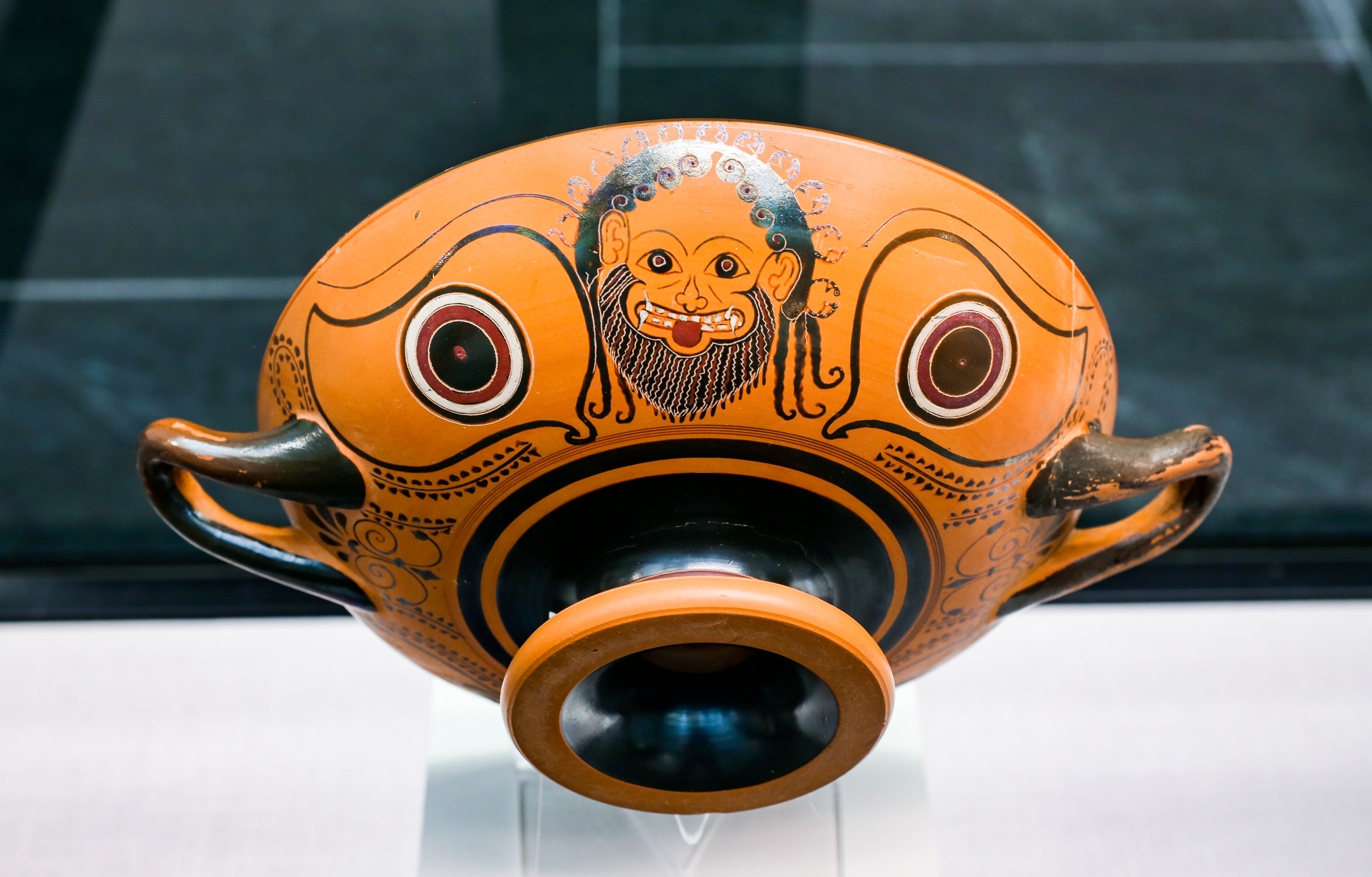
Fig. 17. Bearded snake-haired gorgoneion; kylix eye-cup, Munich, Staatliche Antikensammlungen 2027 (second half of the sixth century BC)

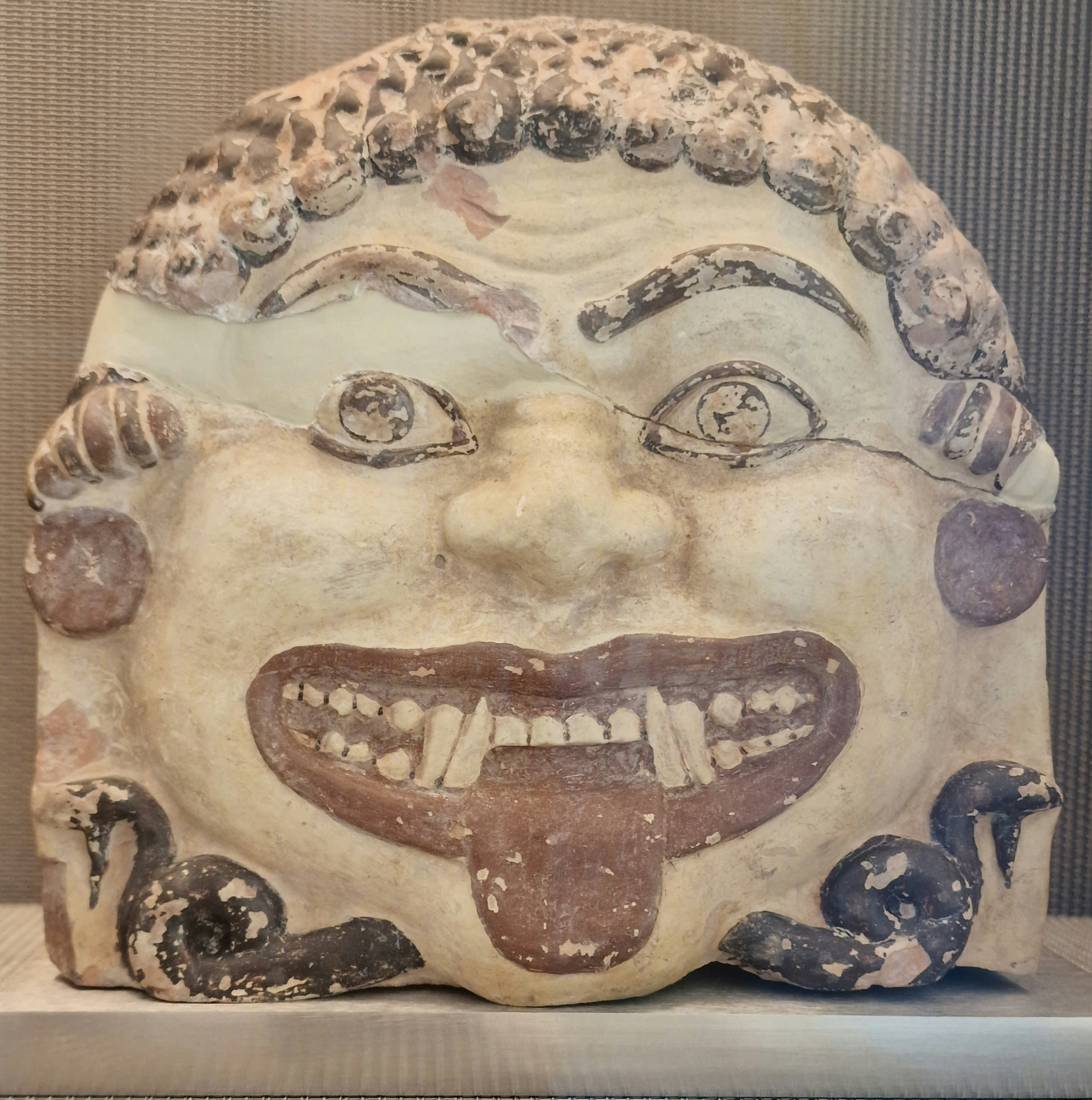
Fig. 18 Gorgoneion with earrings; terracotta antefix from the Acropolis of Athens, Acropolis Museum 78–87, K 292–29 (second half of the sixth century BC)

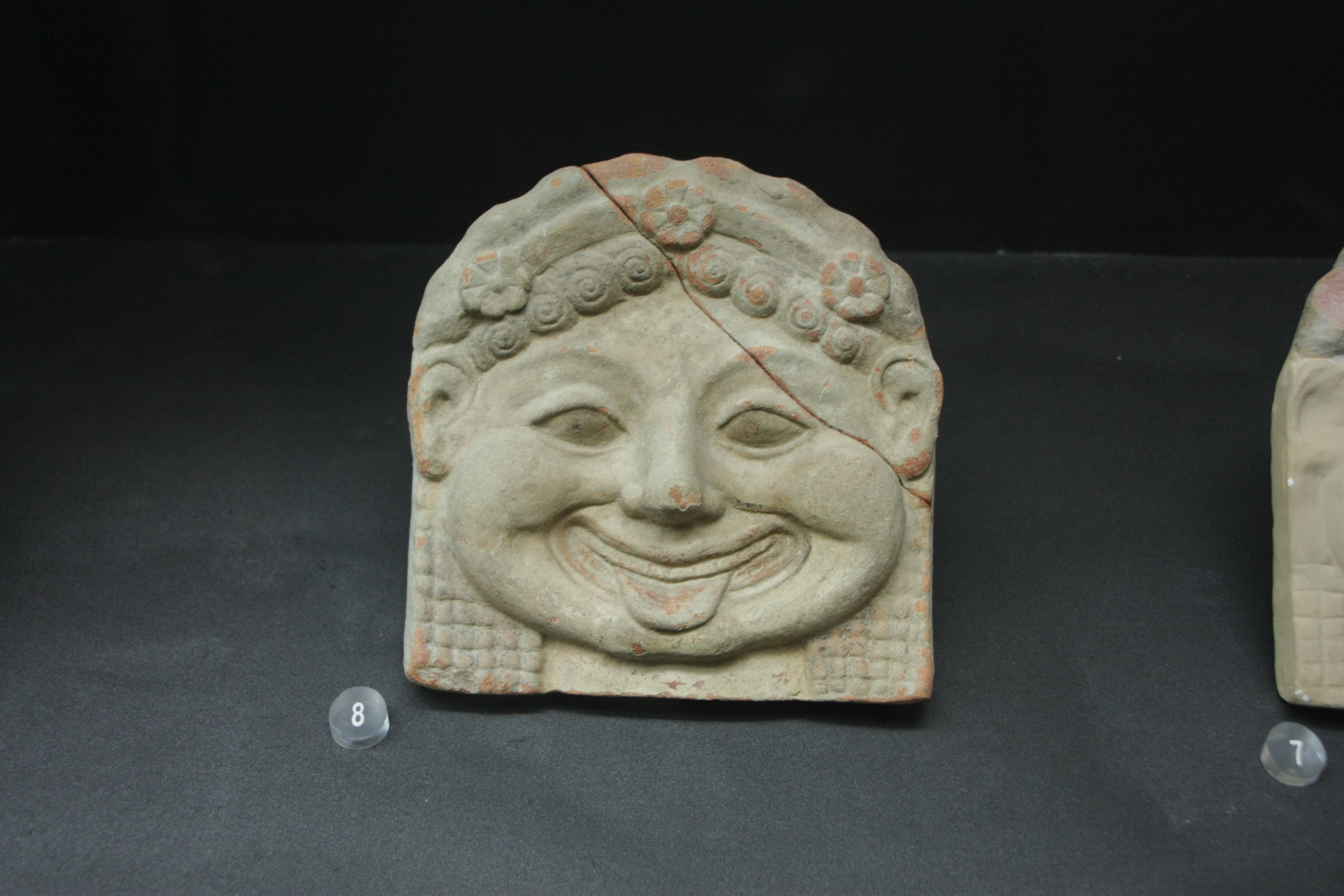
Fig. 19. Gorgoneion; terracotta antefix from the Acropolis of Gela, Museo Archeologico Regionale di Gela (sixth century BC)

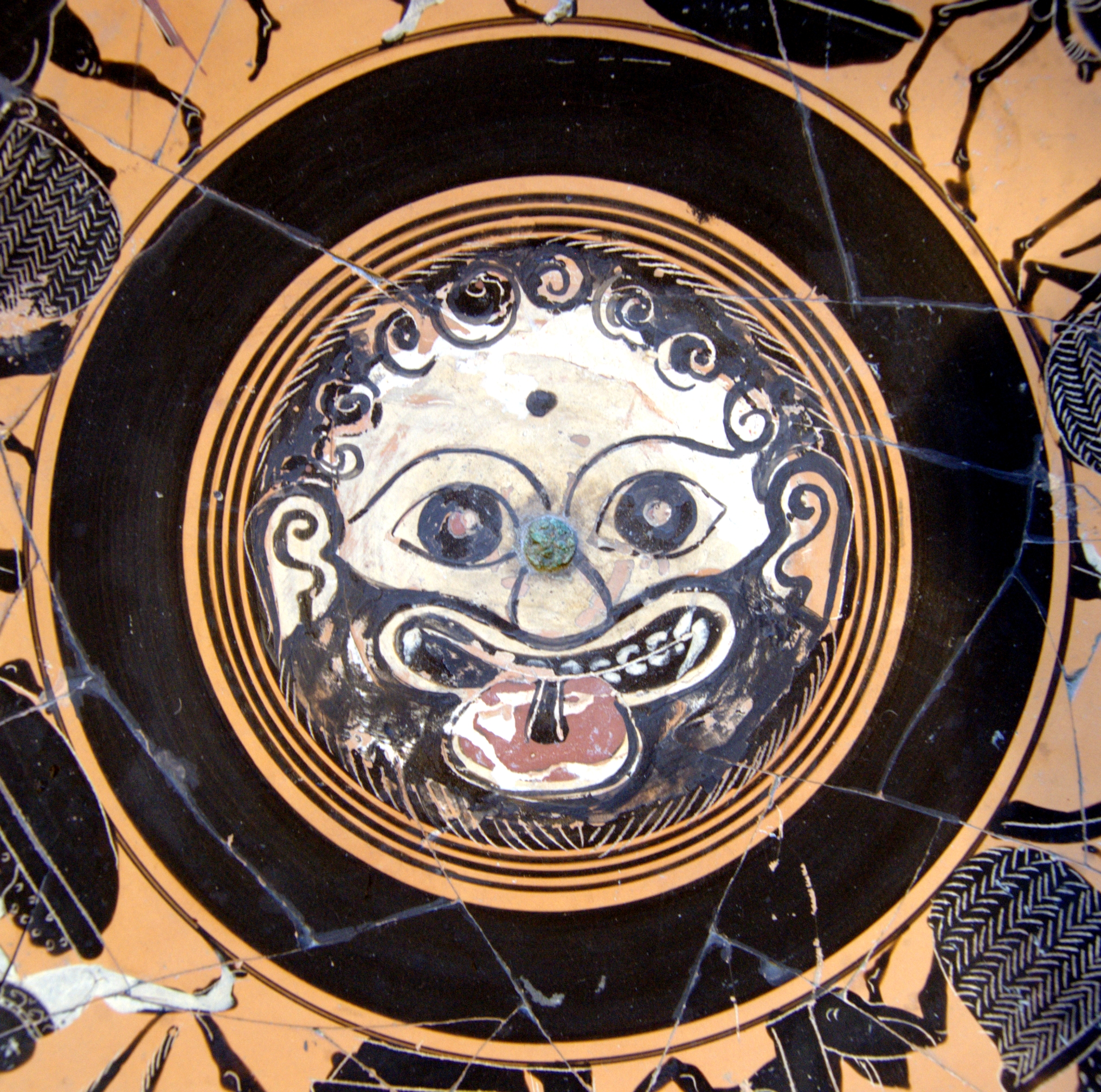
Fig. 20. Gorgoneion; Attic kylix cup, Paris, Cabinet des Medailles 320 (late sixth century BC)

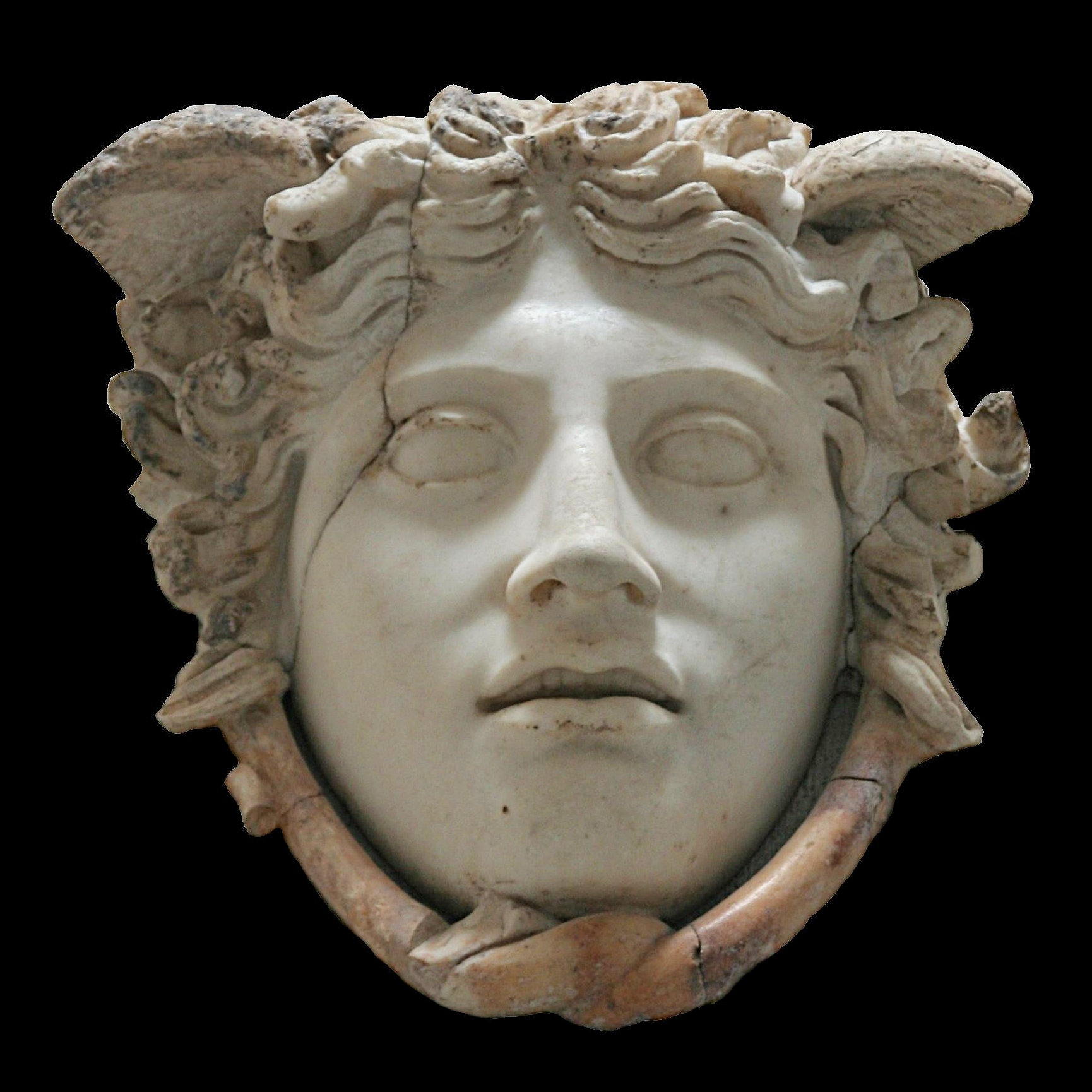
Fig. 21. "Beautiful" gorgoneion, with small head wings and two snakes twined under her chin; the Medusa Rondanini, Munich, Staatliche Antikensammlungen GL 252 (first-second century AD, Roman copy of a Greek original?)

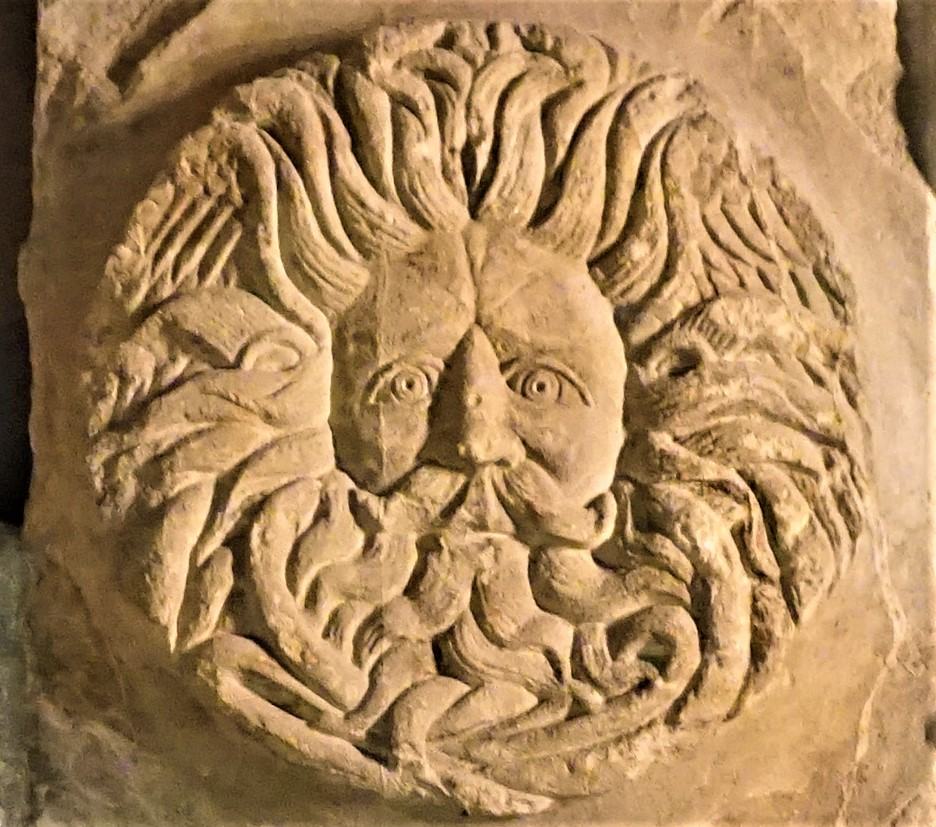
Fig. 22. first century Gorgon's Head of the Temple Sulis Minerva at Bath, considered a mix of Greek, Celtic and Roman iconography

== Possible origins ==
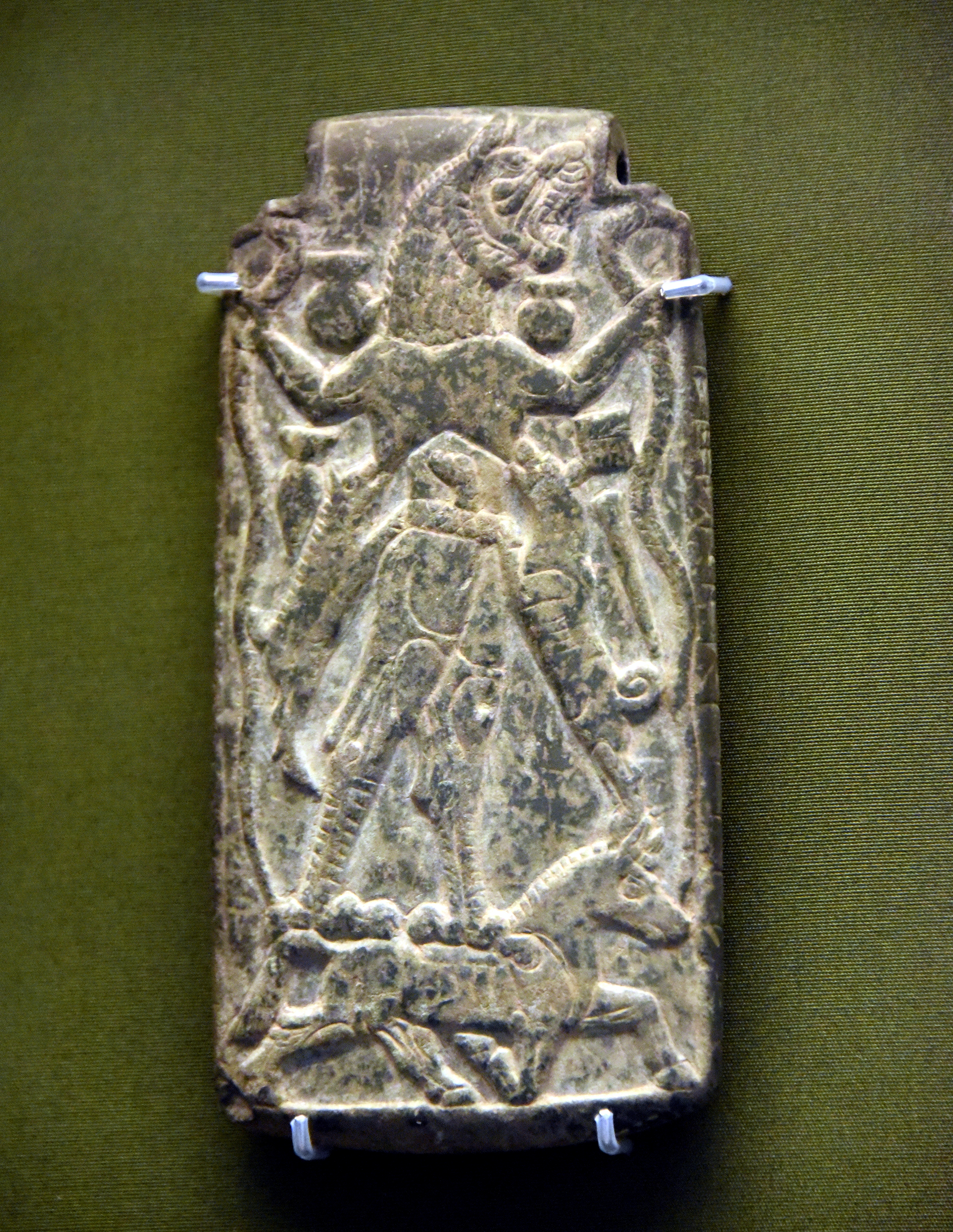
Lamashtu with lion's head, standing on a donkey, holding snakes, with a suckling pig and dog; bronze plate from Charchemish.

There has been considerable and wide-ranging speculation concerning the possible origins of the story of Perseus and the Gorgons, as well as gorgoneia, the representations of Gorgon faces. The origins of the Perseus-Gorgon story, and gorgoneia, even with respect to each other, are uncertain. The Perseus-Gorgon story might have come first inspiring the development of gorgoneia, or gorgoneia might have come first, in which case the Perseus story might have served an etiological function, as an origin myth, developed as a way to explain where gorgoneia had come from. It is also possible that the Perseus story and gorgoneia developed independently, but later converged. Since the earliest literary and iconographic evidence of both the Perseus story and gorgoneia are roughly contemporaneous, such evidence seems unable to definitively distinguish between any of these three scenarios. If the gorgoneia had a different origin separate from Medusa, then that initial context is lost and irrecoverable.

It is possible that the mythology and/or the iconography of Gorgons were subject to Near-Eastern influence. In particular elements of full-bodied Gorgon iconography seem to have been borrowed from that of the Mesopotamian Lamashtu. Mesopotamian depictions of Gilgamesh slaying Humbaba, may have influenced the Perseus-Gorgon story, while gorgoneia may be connected to images of Humbaba.

=== Perseus and the Gorgons ===
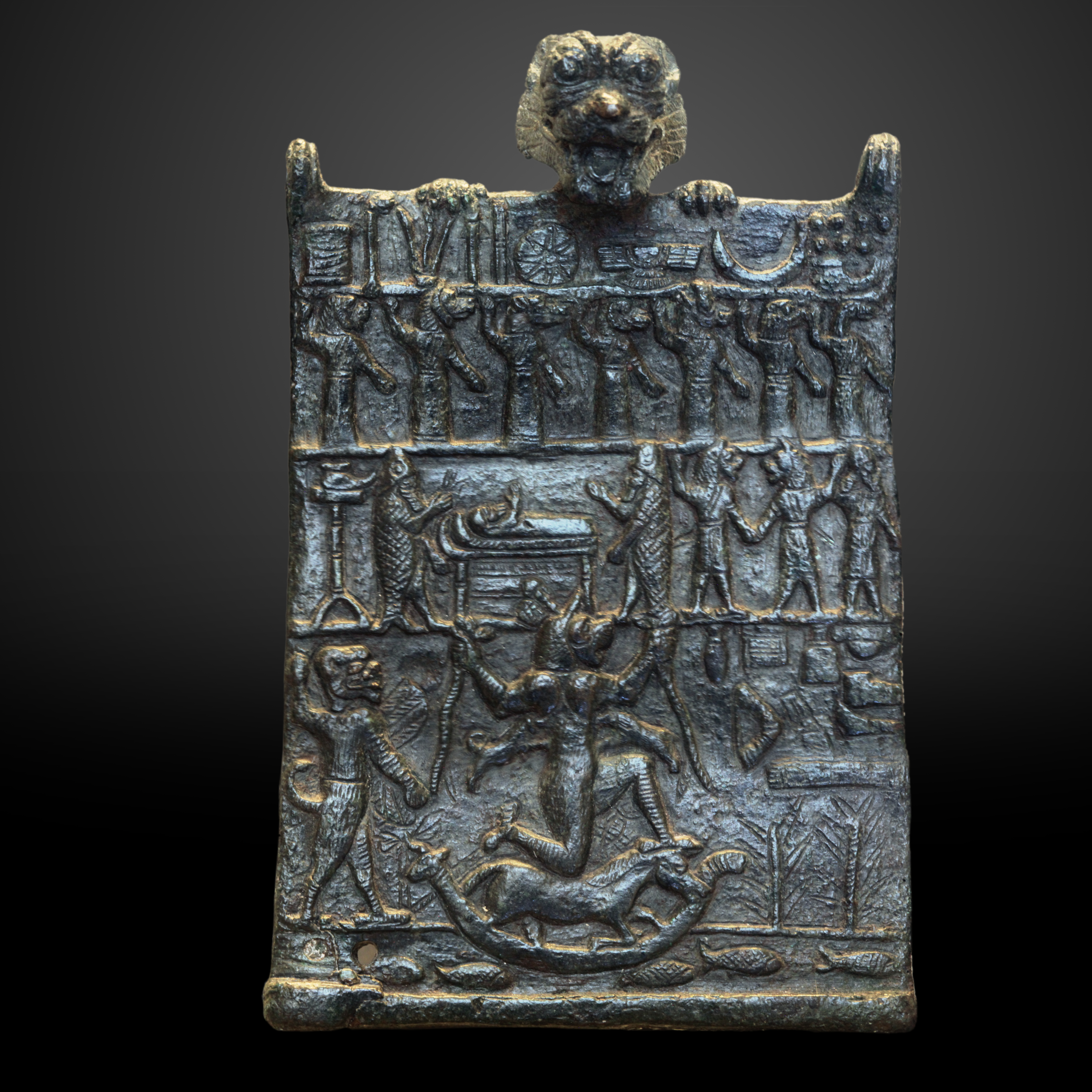
Lamashtu holding two snakes and suckling a dog (?) and pig, in Knielauf position, on a donkey; Louvre AO 22205

The Gorgon as Mistress of Animals, in the Medusa pediment from the temple of Artemis in Corfu (Fig. 6) shows affinities with images of Lamashtu. As Walter Burkert has noted, Lamashtu has several characteristic iconographic elements which include an animalistic head atop a humanoid body, often in the Knielauf (kneeling-running) position, with the presence of snakes, a horse or ass, animal offspring, and sometimes in the Mistress of Animals configuration. All of these elements are present, for example, in the Medusa pediment.

Images which show Perseus, with head turned away, decapitating Medusa (Figs. 1, 7, 11), resemble Mesopotamian depictions of Gilgamesh slaying the wild man Humbaba. Such depictions can show Gilgamesh with head turned away looking behind him for a goddess to pass him a weapon. In particular, a bronze shield strap from Olympia (mid-sixth century BC), which shows Perseus with his head turned away about to decapitate Medusa, assisted by Athena, bears a striking resemblance to a seal impression from Nuzi c. 1450 BC. This suggests the possibility that Greeks misinterpreted or reinterpreted these Mesopotamian images, giving rise, through a process that Burkert has described as a "creative misunderstanding", to the myth of the Gorgon's petrifying gaze.

=== The gorgoneion ===
The consensus among classical scholars seems to be that the function of a gorgoneion was apotropaic, as a device (an apotropaion) to ward away unwanted things, and which was in origin a dancer-worn mask. The classic formulation of this view is that of Jane Ellen Harrison, the gorgoneion as a "ritual mask misunderstood":

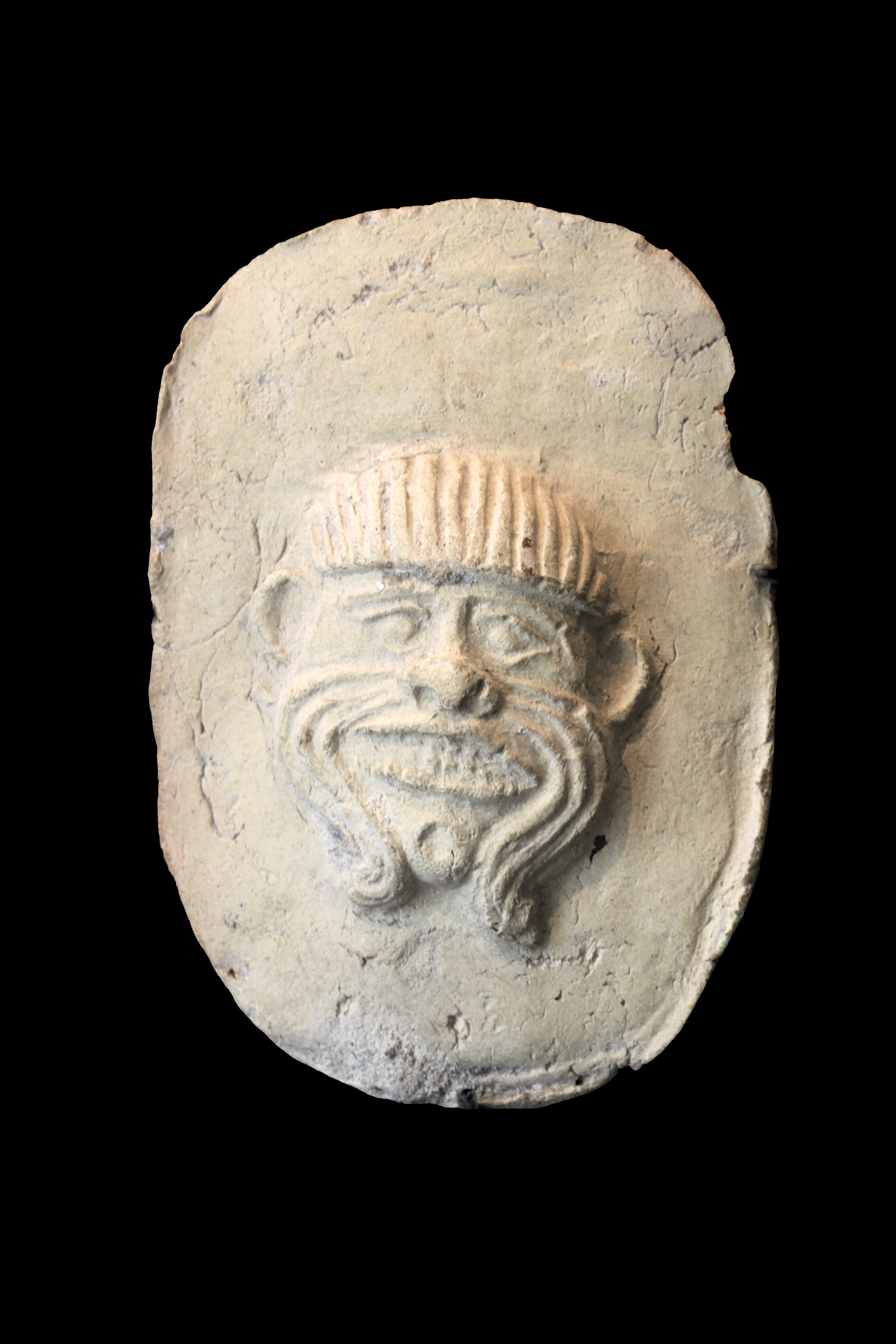
Humbaba with deep S-shaped furrows on either side of a wide-mouthed grimace; Mesopotamian terracotta mask, Louvre AO 12460 (early second millennium BC)

... in her essence Medusa is a head and nothing more; her potency only begins when her head is severed, and that potency resides in the head; she is in a word a mask with a body later appended. The primitive Greek knew that there was in his ritual a horrid thing called a Gorgoneion, a grinning mask with glaring eyes and protruding beast-like tusks and pendent tongue. How did this Gorgoneion come to be? A hero had slain a beast called the Gorgon, and this was its head. Though many other associations gathered round it, the basis of the Gorgoneion is a cultus object, a ritual mask misunderstood. The ritual object comes first; then the monster is begotten to account for it; then the hero is supplied to account for the slaying of the monster.

That gorgoneia were used as apotropaic shield devices, at least, seems evident from Agamemnon's gorgoneion-shield, which Homer describes in the Iliad as displaying "the Gorgon, grim of aspect, glaring terribly, and about her were Terror and Rout". Supporting the view that gorgoneia originated as masks, are two groups of seventh-century BC terracotta gorgonion-like masks: a group of wearable helmet masks from Tiryns, and another group of non-wearable votive masks from the Sanctuary of Orthia at Sparta, which share some features with the typical earliest representations of Gorgon faces. If such masks were in fact intended to represent the face of a Gorgon, then they would show that Gorgons or gorgoneia played a role in some kind of ritualistic or dramatic practice or performance.

The gorgonesque votive masks from Sparta have deep S-shaped furrows on either side of wide-mouthed grimaces. Such features resemble those on the much earlier terracotta plaques depicting Humbaba.

== In popular culture ==
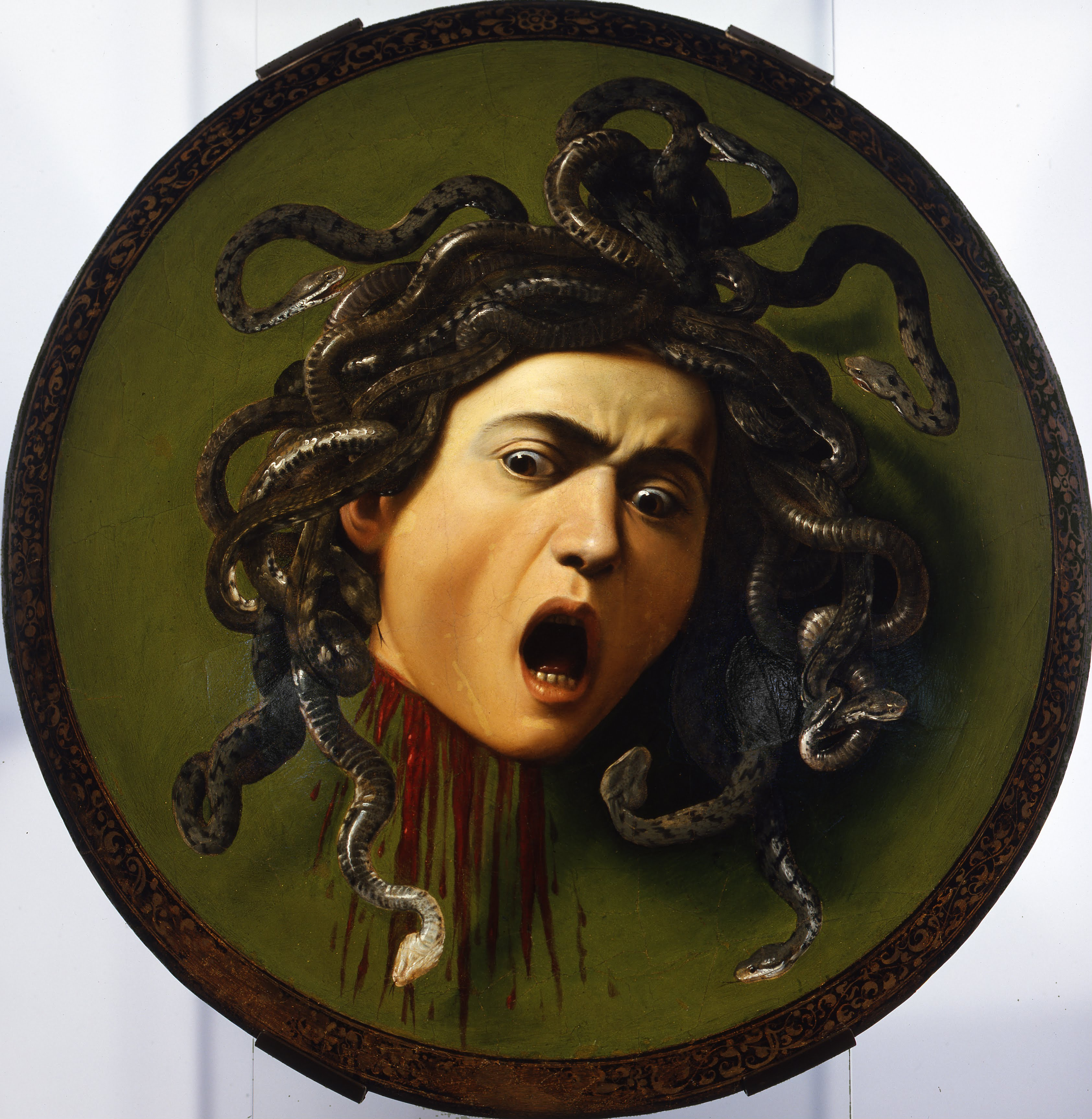
Medusa by Caravaggio; Ufizzi Gallery, Florence

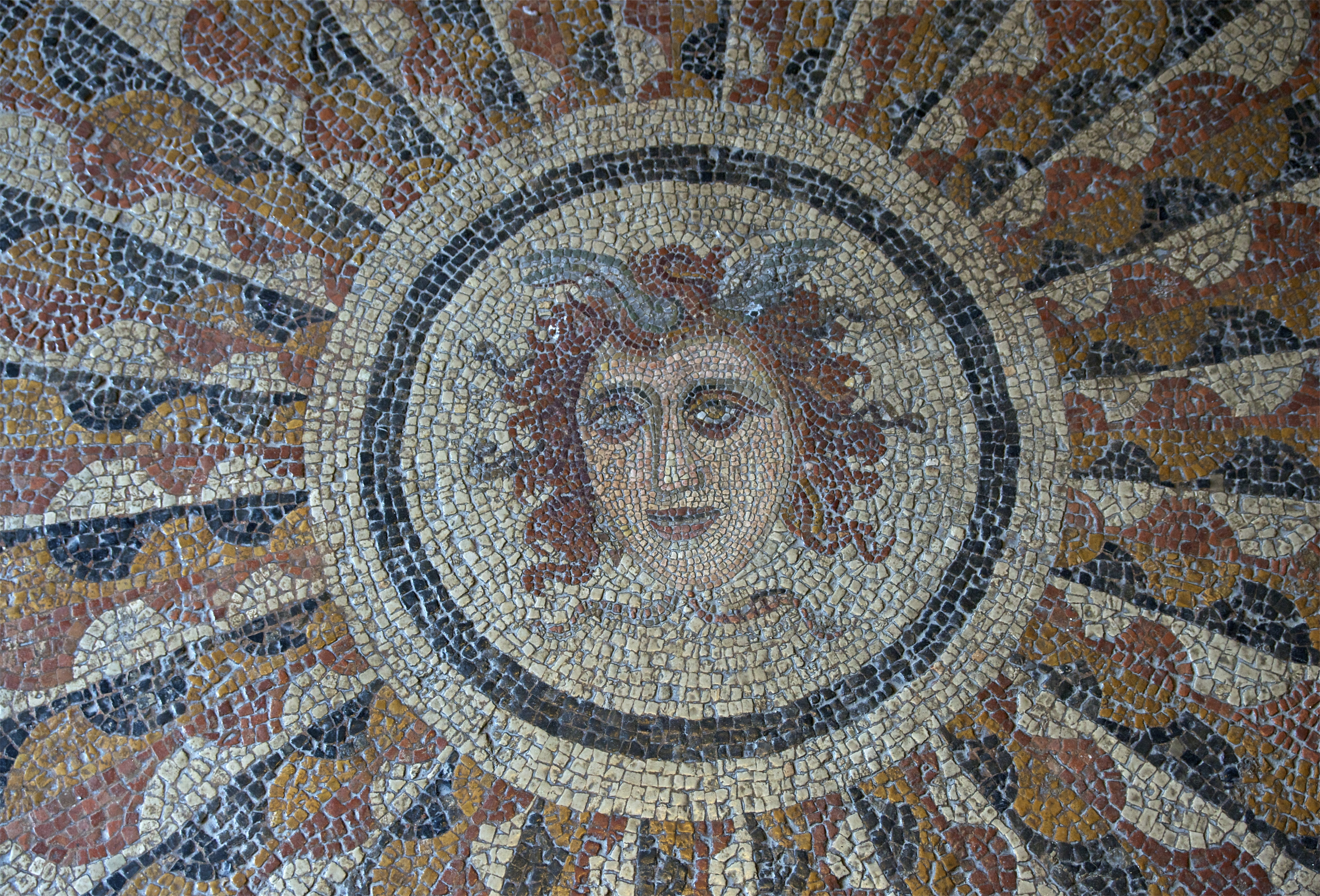
Central motive of the Medusa mosaic, 2nd century BCE, from Kos island, in the palace of the Grand Master of the Knights of Rhodes, in Rhodes city, island of Rhodes, Greece.

Medusa and the other Gorgon sisters, Stheno and Euryale, have been featured in art and culture spanning from the days of ancient Greece to present day. Medusa is the most well-known of the three mythological monsters, having been variously portrayed as a monster, a protective symbol, a rallying symbol for liberty, and a sympathetic victim of rape or a curse.

The Gorgons are best known by their hair of living venomous snakes and ability to turn living creatures to stone. Medusa herself is an ancient icon that remains one of the most popular and enduring figures of Greek mythology. She continues to be recreated in pop culture and art, surpassing the popularity of many other mythological characters. Her likeness has been immortalized by artists including Leonardo da Vinci, Peter Paul Rubens, Caravaggio, Pablo Picasso, Auguste Rodin, and Benvenuto Cellini.
