= Kylix depicting Pentathletes =

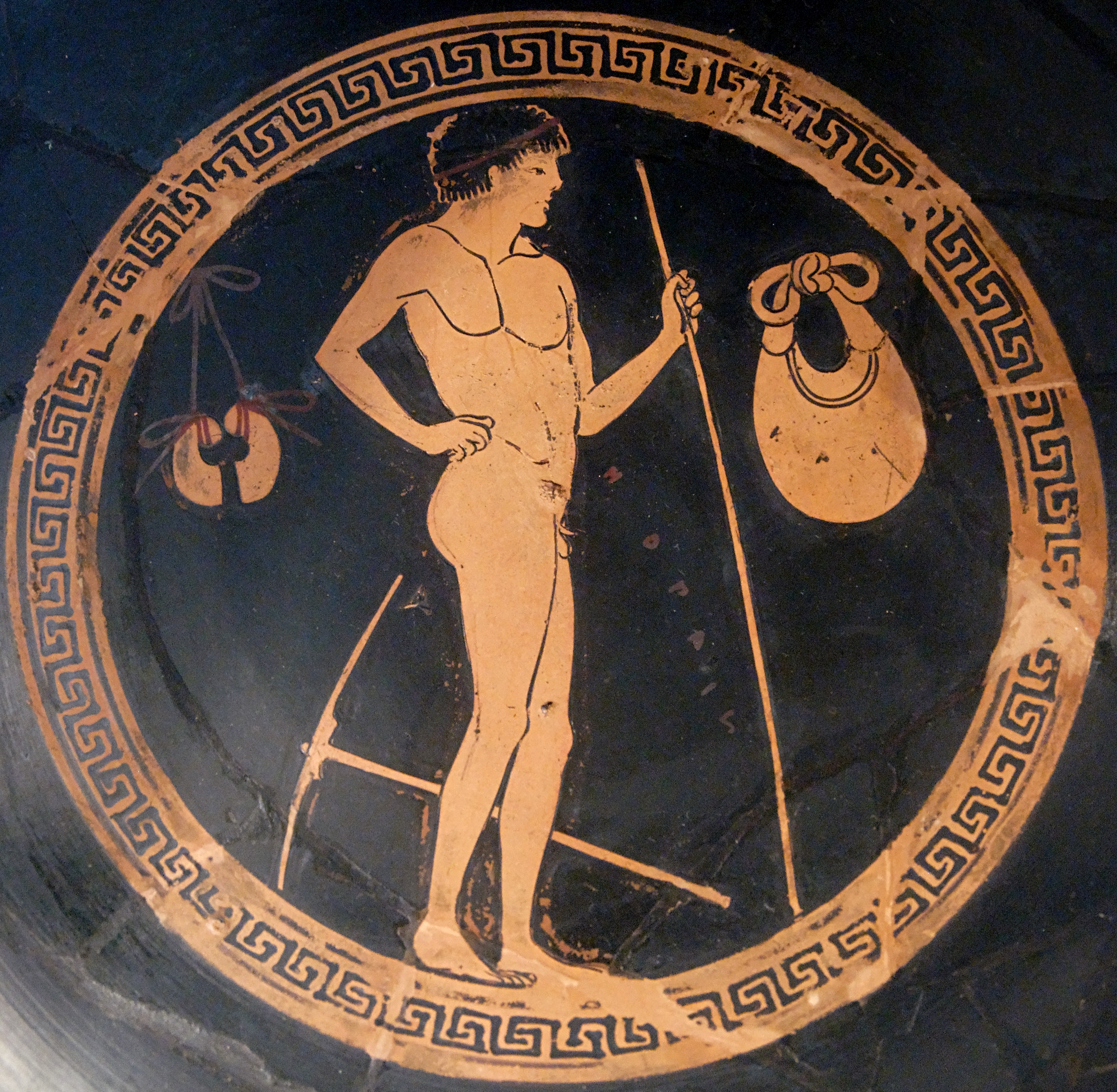
This image depicts an athlete holding a javelin. There is also a pick for loosening dirt in the background as well as two jumping weights hanging up. While this is not the kylix described, the basic elements of the iconography and decorations are similar.

The kylix depicting pentathletes is an example of pottery and decoration from the late Archaic period. This piece is decorated both around the outside of the vessel and on the tondo inside with images of different events from the pentathlon. The drinking kylix is decorated in the red-figure style and is credited to the Proto-Panaitian group. It is currently at the Boston Museum for Fine Arts as part of their Ancient Greek collection.

== Description of kylix ==
This drinking kylix depicting pentathletes is from Attica around 510–500 BC. The vessel itself is 7.6 x 29.8 cm and decorated with red-figure painting. This kylix is believed to have been made by the Proto-Panaitian Group. The Pioneer Group was the predecessor of this new group of red-figure artists who are said to have focused on "more elaborate features and anatomy" in their images. The group as a whole focused more on the depiction of male athletes as the focus of their decoration. The characteristics of this kylix support this theme.

This kylix has a lot of decoration. The tondo inside shows an image of a young, male athlete holding jumping weights. He is in a running pose much like the Knielauf used in many other art forms to display movement. His body is twisted in preparation but since he is looking back it is unclear if he is preparing to jump. Behind him there are two javelins, presumably leaning against a wall. There is not much detail in the athletes features but the simplicity keeps the images clean and easy to see. In addition, there is an inscription around the youth reading "Athenodotos is handsome". The athlete now has a name and the inscription emphasizes the high regard the Ancient Greeks held their athletes.

The sides of the kylix also show images from the pentathlon including javelin throwing and long jump. On Side A there are three figures shown. From left to right there is an athlete picking up a javelin, and other athlete holding two javelins, and a third figure holding a pick. Picks were used to loosen the dirt so that when a javelin landed it would go into the ground. The images on this side do not show the movement of throwing the javelin, but instead show all the parts in preparation for the event.

On Side B there are three other athletes as well as an inscription. Again, from left to right there are two athletes each holding two javelins moving to the right while a third athlete has a jumping weight in his left hand and he seems to be making a hand motion at the others. In the background there is another pick. There is also an inscription that reads "The boy is handsome". It is unclear if this is referencing one athlete or describing all figures in the images. However, either way it is clear the artist wants the athletes to be praised.

== Discovery ==
This vessel was said to be found in a tomb in Ancient Capua. This tomb was in southern Italy and could be evidence of trade or of the Greek colonization in southern Italy. It had a series of owners after its discovery but was eventually bought by the Museum for Fine Art in 1898 after its last owner passed away.

== History of the Pentathlon ==
The pentathlon is a series of five athletic events where the victor is decided by the highest overall performance. The five events were discus-throwing, javelin, long jump, running, and wrestling. The pentathlon itself was introduced to the games at Olympia in 708 BC which was also the first year wrestling was a part of the Olympic games. Pentathletes were admired by the ancient Greek society because they had to possess speed, strength, and power in order to win. All the events were held on the same day and while the order of the events is unclear, it is known that wrestling was held last.

The scoring of the Pentathlon is also still under discussion. There is not written evidence on how each event was ranked or how athletes were judged in their performance like there is for the athletic pentathlon now. While this is slightly problematic, scholars have determined some models that could potentially reflect what was used. These models are not perfect but they display a certain record each athlete must achieve in order to be the victor. Athletics was an important part of Greek culture because it highlighted power and beauty in youths. The spectrum of athletic events included in the pentathlon led people to consider those who participated to be some of the best ever. The respect and praise pentathletes received was enough that their images were used as decorations for pottery vessels many times over; their depiction and ever present image of the perfect human form.

== Respect for Pentathetes ==
It is known that athletes in Ancient Greece were highly praised but pentathletes specifically were highly regarded. In Aristotle's Rhetoric he writes two times why pentathletes are the most handsome and best athletes culminating it with "he who excels in all [is] for the pentathlon". These athletes had to be very versatile and flexible in their abilities in order to win the event overall and that is what made them so special. Since the five events required different muscles and strength to succeed, someone that could master all of them to a point of victory was impressive and therefore deserved respect. In addition, the victors of athletic events gained elite status and were sometimes invited to engage in special activity like sitting in the front row or prohedria of a theatrical production. These added benefits along with the frequent depiction of athletes in Greek art shows the high regard the society held for athletes.
