= Bouleuterion of Ancient Olympia =

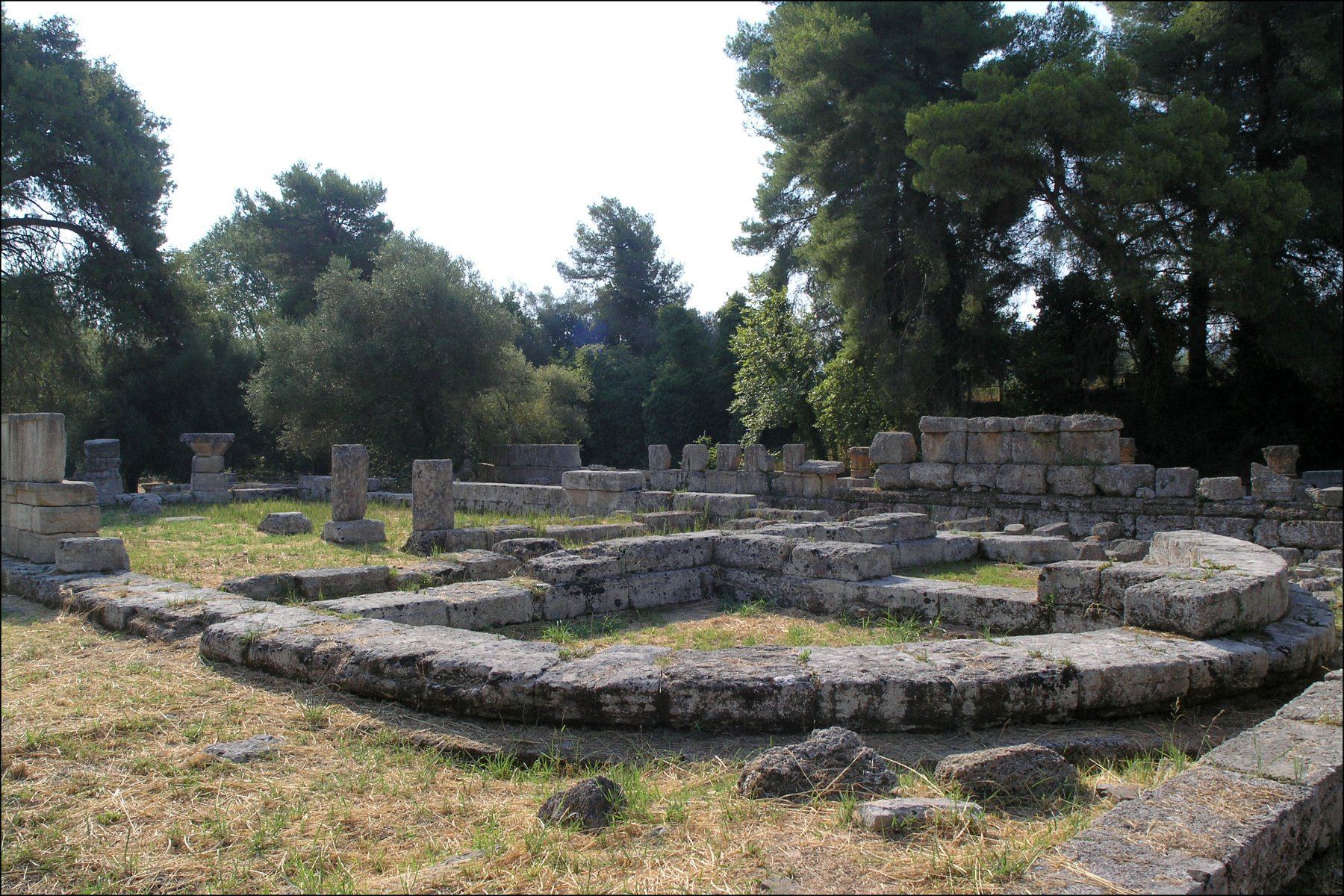
Bouleuterion of Olympia

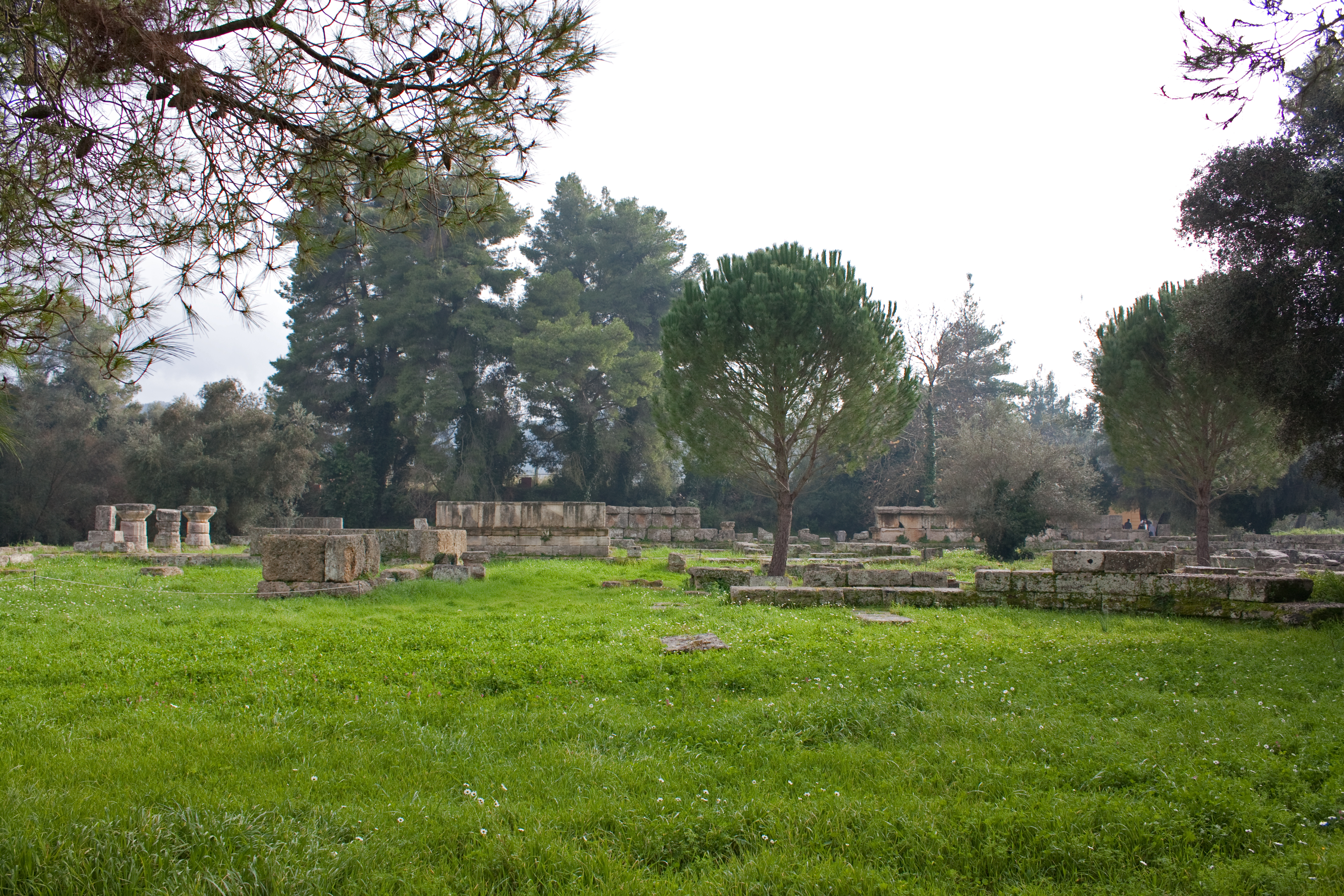
Bouleuterion area in Olympia

The Bouleuterion (Council House) of Ancient Olympia was a building inside the archaeological site of Olympia. A bouleuterion was an assembly house for local legislatures and other meetings.

Building complex comprising two main buildings, a square room, and a stoa. The edifices were erected south of the Temple of Zeus and date back to the 6th - 4th Century BC.

== Description ==
The Bouleuterion is situated inside the sacred enclosure of the Altis, south of the temple of Zeus. The Bouleuterion consisted of two apsidal buildings on its west side, which were connected to a square hall and an Ionic portico on the east side. Construction began in the sixth century BC and was completed in the fourth century BC. However, minor additions and changes were made during the Roman period.

The Bouleuterion was the seat of the Elean Senate. Since the Elean Senate was responsible for the organization of the ancient Olympic Games, the site of the Bouleuterion played a major role in their administration. This is where the participation of an athlete was decided, the athletes registered and drew lots, penalties for offenses were given, etc. Inside the Bouleuterion were the altar and the statue of Zeus Horkeios, where athletes gave their oath before the start of the Olympic Games.
