= Halteres (ancient Greece) =

Weights used in Ancient Greek athletics

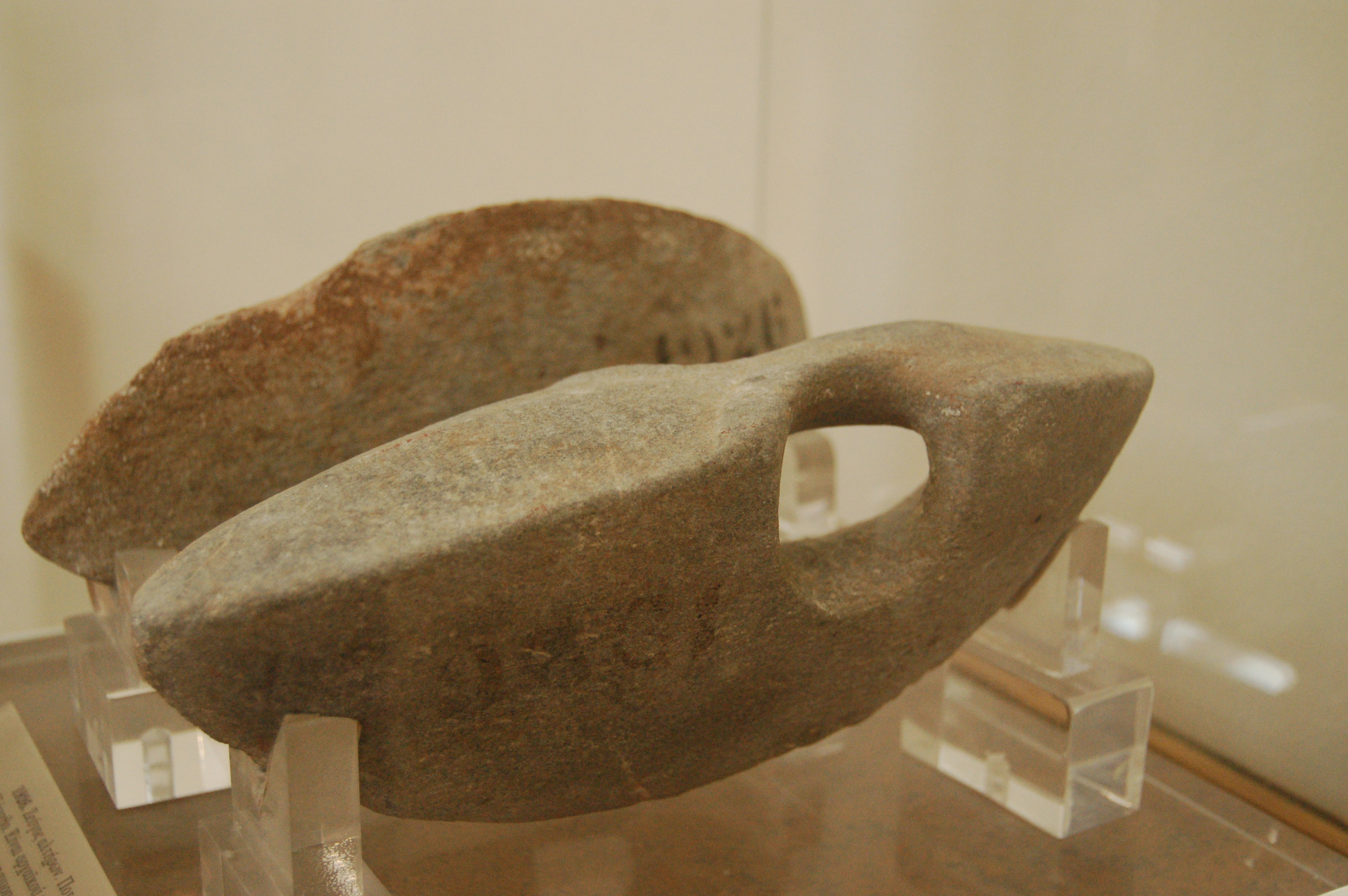
Halteres used in athletic games in ancient Greece, National Archaeological Museum, Athens.

Halteres (/hælˈtəriːz/; Greek: ἁλτῆρες, from "ἅλλομαι" - hallomai, "leap, spring"; cf. "ἅλμα" - halma, "leaping") were a type of dumbbell used in ancient Greece. In ancient Greek sports, halteres were used as lifting weights, and also as weights in their version of the long jump. Halteres were held in both hands to allow an athlete to jump a greater distance; they may have been dropped after the first or second jump.

The athlete would swing the weights backwards and forwards just before take-off, thrust them forwards during take-off, and swing them backwards just before releasing them and landing. Halteres were made of stone or metal and weighed between 2 and 9 kg (4 and 20 lb). They added about 17 cm (7 in) to a 3 m (10 ft) long jump.

== History ==
Recognized as the Greek equivalent of modern-day dumbbells, the halteres served multiple uses from training to competition. Ancient Greek records show evidence of the halteres dating to as far back as 700 BC. In ancient Greece, exercise and training was highly valued. By the 5th century BC, halteres were of common use in ancient Greek training regimes. Popularity of the halteres grew globally as by the 2nd century BC, famous Greek physician, Galen, came up with a variety of exercises that required the use of halteres. Galen insisted halteres as a necessity for physical fitness as it trained the body for war.

The Romans, who also had a strong concern on physical fitness as a civic virtue, adopted the use of halteres in their exercises as a means to strengthen their armies. In his book Description of Greece, Greek geographer Pausanias defined halteres as “half of a circle, but elliptical and made so that the fingers pass through as they do through the handle of a shield.”

Regarding the Greeks, specifically Greek pentathletes, halteres were most popularly used to train for specific sporting events in the ancient Olympic Games, most notably the long jumping events. The use of halteres built strength and allowed for stronger athletic performances from ancient Greek athletes.

== As exercise equipment ==
According to Greek surgeon Antyllus, the use of halteres in workouts consisted of three main exercises:

- Curls – similar to modern bicep curls, halteres were curled up from the waist to the shoulders with the forearm held straight.
- Lunges – whereas modern day lunges are mainly focused to train the lower body, the ancient Greeks used halteres in lunging form to train the shoulders. While lunging, halteres were held out front with both arms stretched at full length. (Modern lunges are performed with the dumbbells hanging at the side of the body.)
- Deadlifts – similar to modern deadlifts, though instead of a using a bar, users picked up each haltere with the respective hand while bending the lower back and then straightening it. Bending and straightening was repeated while lifting the halteres.

== Use in long-jumping ==
To gain maximum distance in jumping, ancient Greek athletes held the halteres in both hands, swinging them outward during takeoff and then behind during landing. According to physiologists, the halteres distributed a shift in the body's center of gravity, thus increasing a jumper's arc by at least a few centimeters during an event.

== Gallery ==
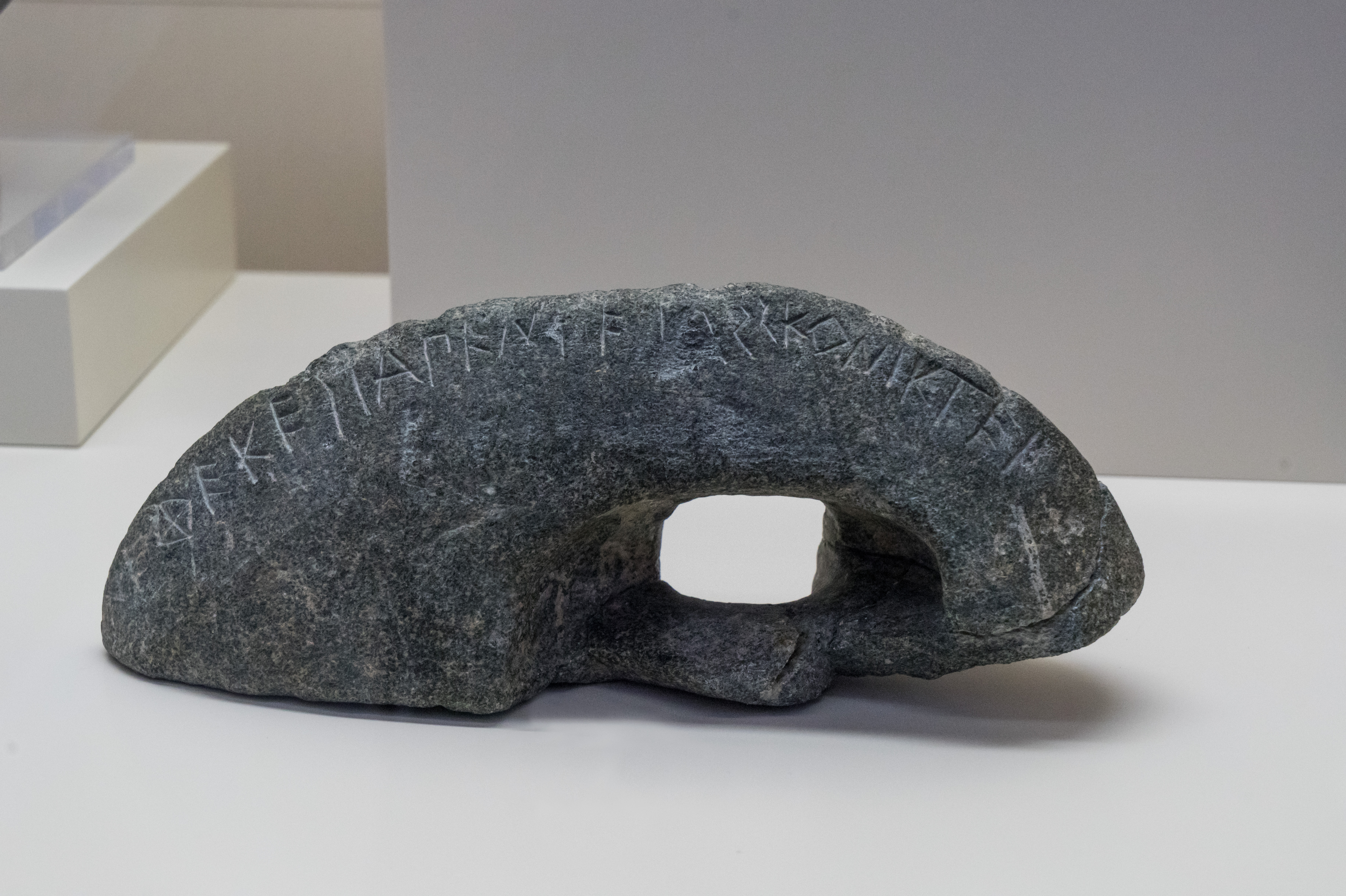
A haltere belonged to Spartan athlete, Akmatidas, the winner of a pentathlon competition in the ancient Olympic Games. Museum of the History of the Olympic Games of antiquity in Olympia, Greece

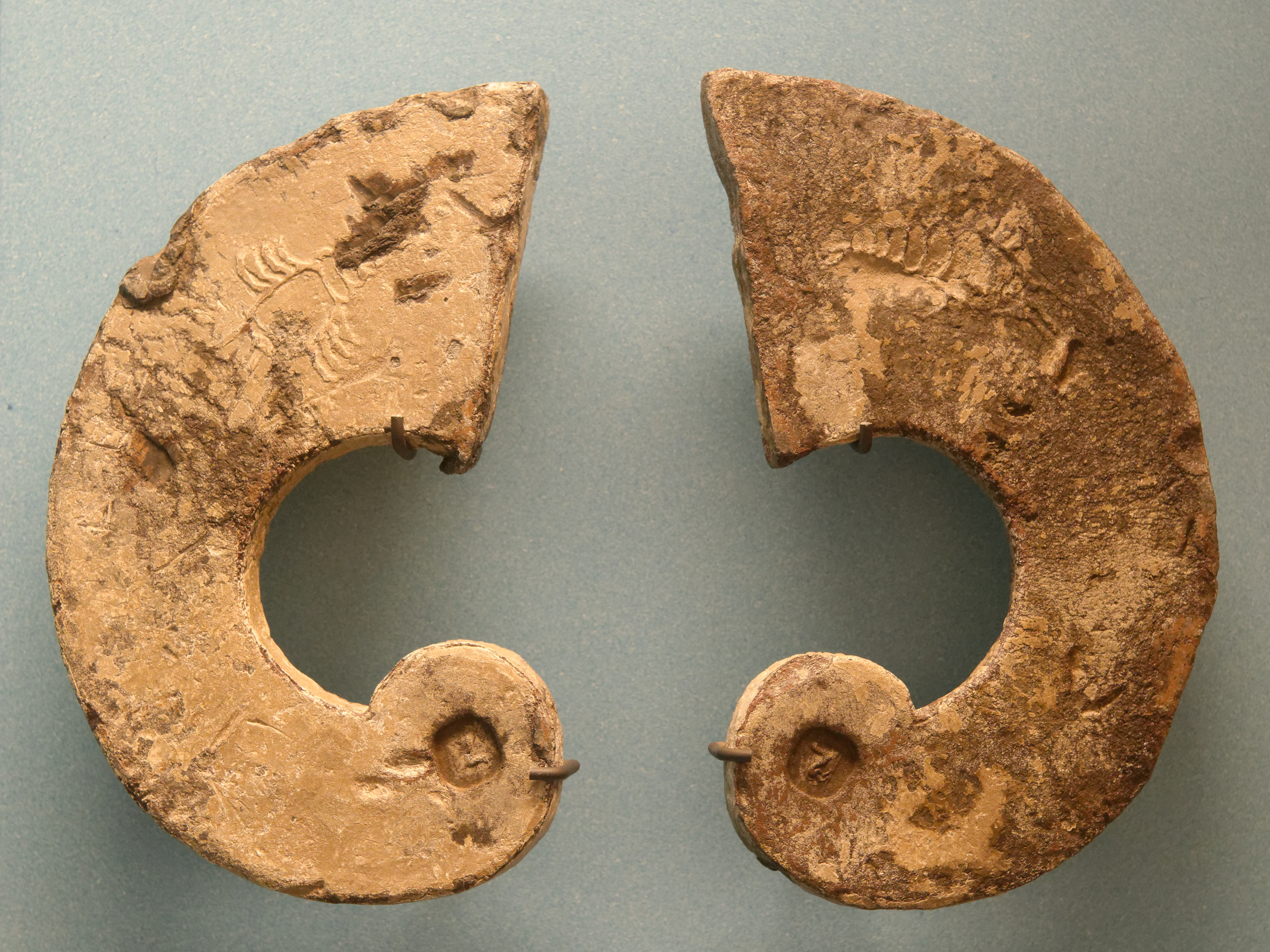
Ancient Greek jumping weights

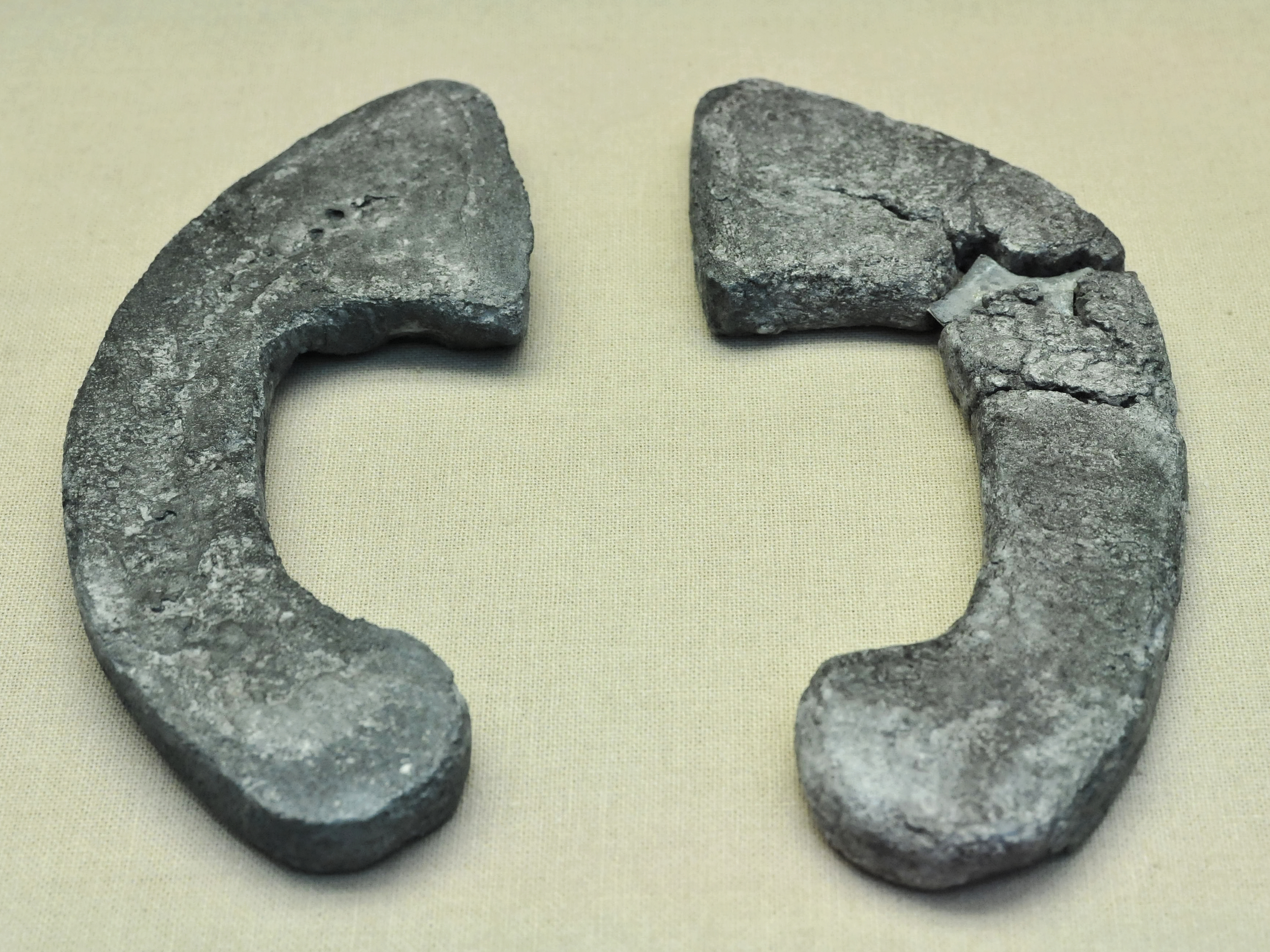
A different design of the weights

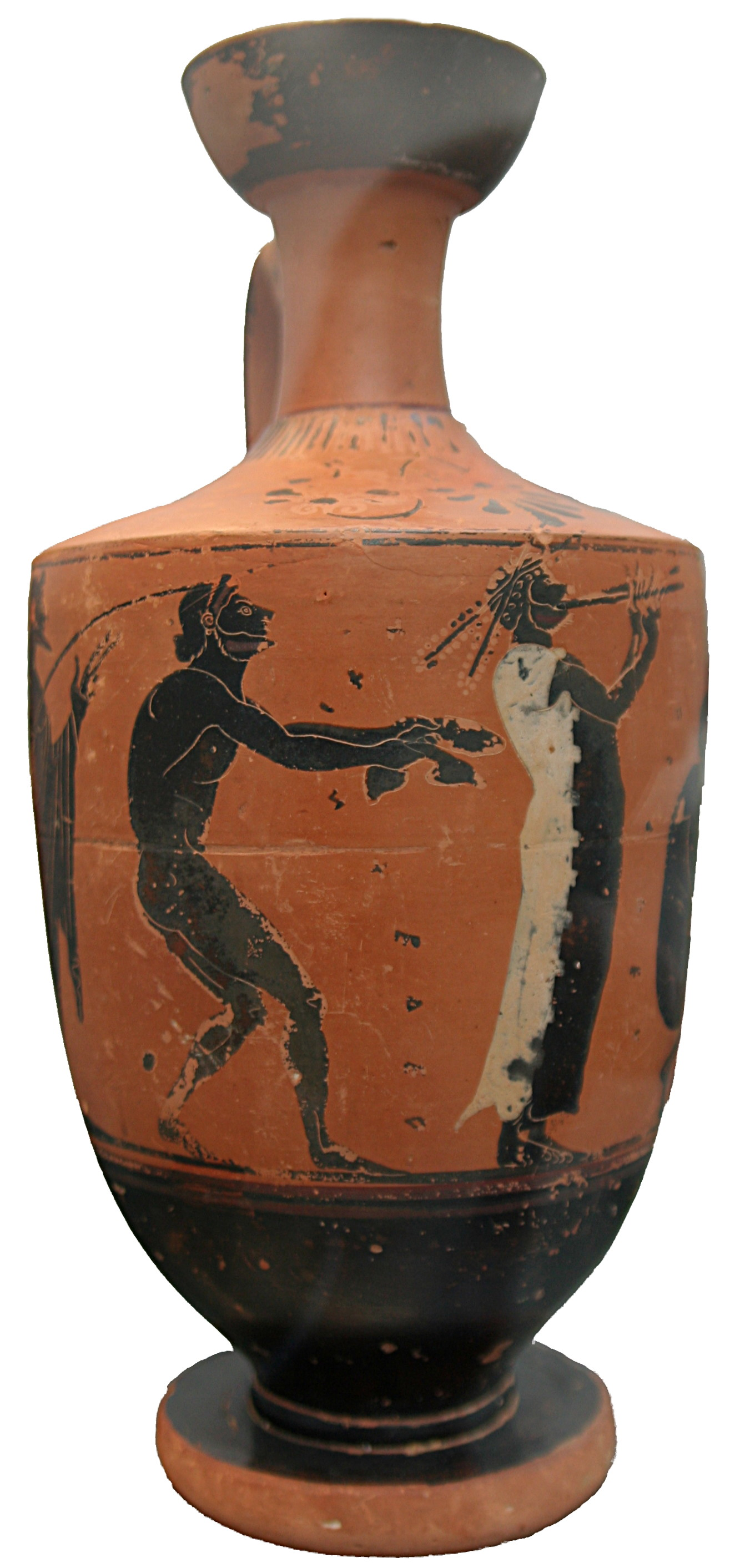
Athlete holding halteres. Ancient Greek Attic black-figure lekythos, 525–500 BC, from Sicily. Staatliche Antikensammlungen, Munich.

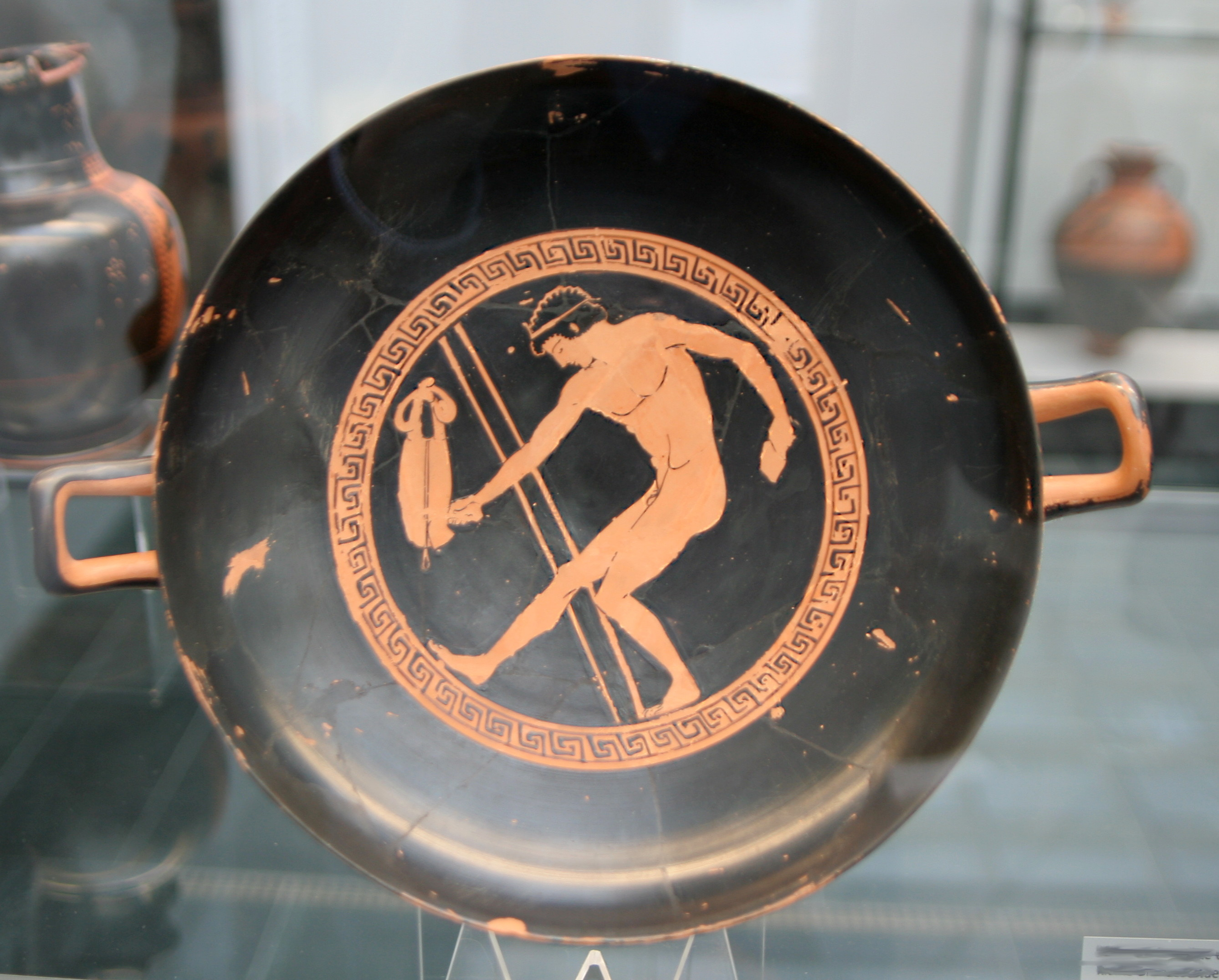
Young athlete with jumping weights, used to maintain equilibrium during the jump

== See also ==
- Vertical jump
- History of physical training and fitness
