= Megarian Treasury =

Megarian Treasury may refer to the following ancient Greek buildings:

- Megarian Treasury (Olympia)
- Megarian Treasury (Delphi)
