= Winged Gorgoneion =

6th century BC Greek shield decoration

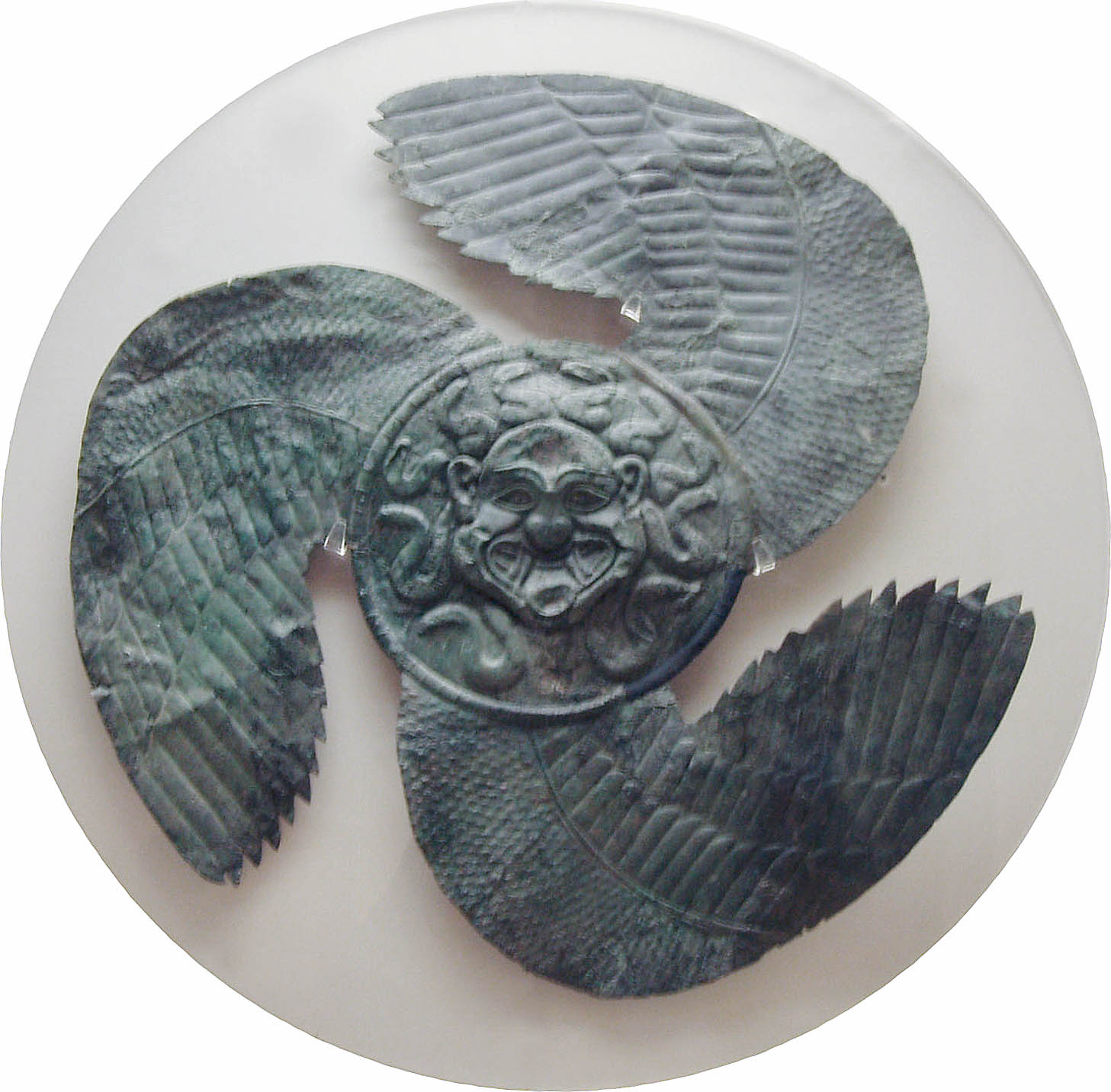
Winged Gorgoneion

The Winged Gorgoneion is a bronze shield decoration from the first half of the 6th century BC, which served as an apotropaion on a shield. It was found during the excavations at Olympia and is now in the Archaeological Museum of Olympia (inventory number B 110).

== Description ==
The gorgoneion was found by the north wall of the stadion. The diameter of the central hub with the head of Medusa on it measures 34 cm, while the total diameter is 81.5 cm. The central hub is entirely taken up by the head of the gorgon and her hair of snakes. The eyes were probably inset with bone and were probably ringed by marked eyelids. The open mouth is clearly marked off from the chin and jowls by a pair of bulging lips. Under the chin there are traces which probably mark the remains of a soldered beard. The Gorgon's bared teeth, tusks and tongue hanging from her mouth would be intended to increase the deterrent effect of the symbol. The hub is surrounded by three sickle-shaped wings, one of which did not survive and has been restored with a modern replica.

The location of the gorgoneion's creation is unclear.

== Context ==
Shield decorations with various images, including animal heads, plants, ornaments or later gorgoneia, are known from the 8th century BC from battle scenes on Late Geometric Attic vases and literary descriptions. Actual shield decorations of the Archaic period have been found most notably at Olympia; these are bronze sheets into which designs have been hammered or engraved. With the development of Greek religion from the 6th century BC, the belief in the power of apotropaia dwindled and as a result shield decorations cease to be attested from the fifth century BC.

== Sources ==
- Hanna Koenigs-Philipp. "Geflügeltes Gorgoneion" in Alfred Mallwitz, Hans-Volkmar Herrmann (ed.). Die Funde aus Olympia. Deutsches Archäologisches Institut, Athens 1980, p. 108.
