= Sculpture of a horse (Olympia B 1741) =

Archaic bronze sculpture

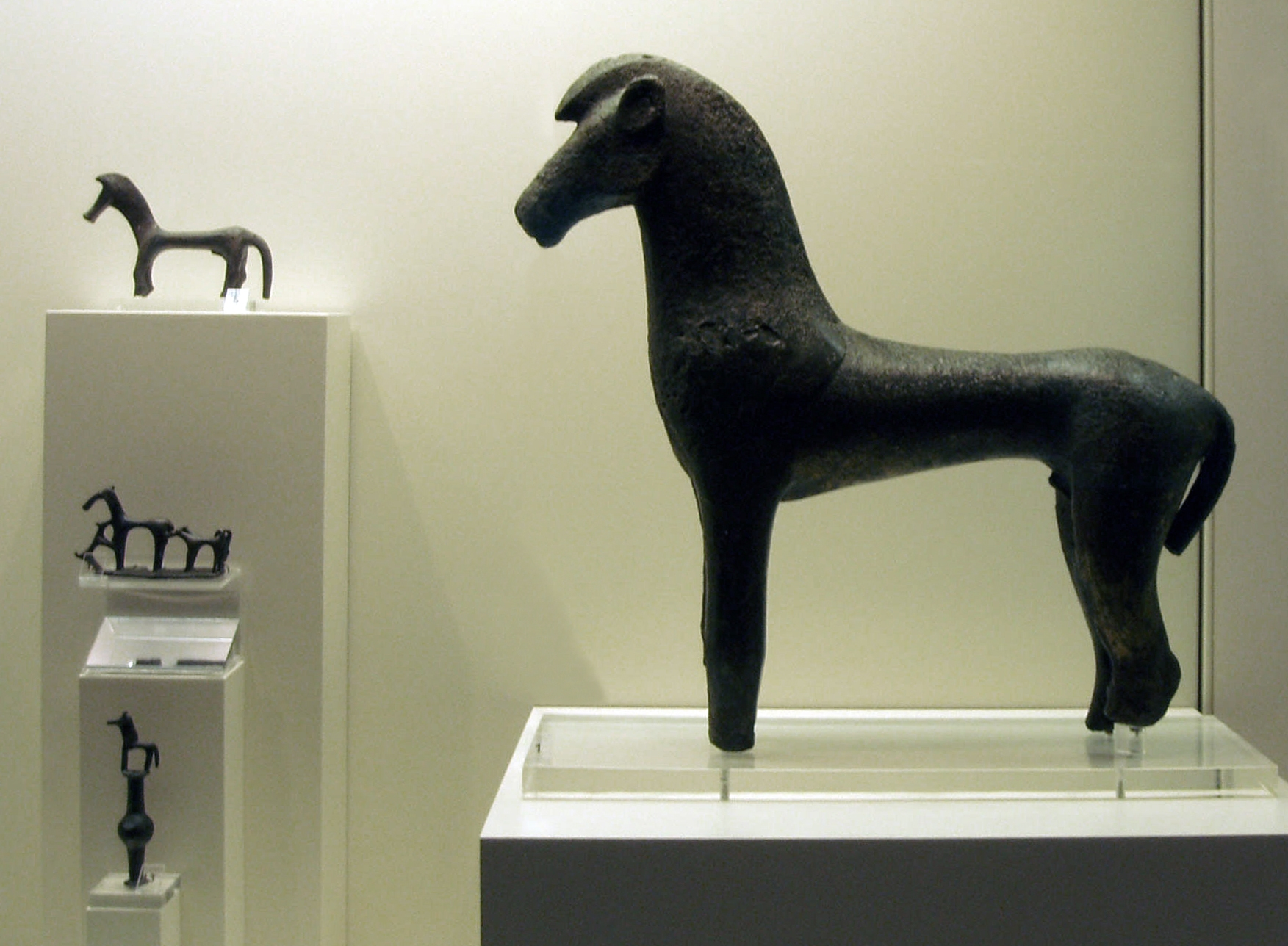
In the foreground, at right, the sculpture of a horse; in the background, various small archaic sculptures

The Sculpture of a Horse is an Archaic bronze sculpture. It was discovered at Olympia during excavations in 1939 and is now displayed in the Archaeological Museum of Olympia. The sculpture's creation is dated to the early 7th century BC.

The sculpture is 45.5 cm high and 47 cm long. It was discovered in an archaic fountain under the mosaic floor of the House of Nero. It is heavily dented, but almost entirely intact; only the ends of the legs and the tail have been broken off. The curved tail had been snapped off, but it has been reattached to the sculpture. Originally, the sculpture would have been about half a metre tall.

The horse is artistically and stylistically modest, and its execution is not outstanding, but it is of great art historical interest. It represents a unique transitional piece, between the small scale of the Geometric style and the larger scale of the Archaic period, in which it was attempted to expand a smaller figure using traditional techniques. The sculpture was made from two pieces which were cast separately as solid blocks and then connected to each other. The casting technique was not suitable for sculptures of this size and the attempt to connect the two pieces without visible seam failed. The two pieces both show casting defects as well. Unsuccessful attempts to transfer Geometric small scale sculpture to a larger scale, like this, probably resulted in the development of hollow casting in the course of the 7th century BC. As the sole surviving work of this kind, the sculpture of a horse is of great significance for understanding the history of metal casting. Probably, the sculpture was intended to be a monument commemorating a victorious horse in the ancient Olympic Games.

== Bibliography ==
- Hans-Volkmar Herrmann: "Pferd." In Alfred Mallwitz, Hans-Volkmar Herrmann (ed.): Die Funde aus Olympia. Deutsches Archäologisches Institut, Athen 1980, pp. 125–126.
- Wolf-Dieter Heilmeyer: Frühe olympische Bronzefiguren. Die Tiervotive (=Olympische Forschungen, Vol. 12). De Gruyter, Berlin 1979, ISBN 3-11-007208-4, pp. 167–170.
