= Echo Stoa =

Olympian stoa

Coordinates: 37.6384°N 21.6317°E

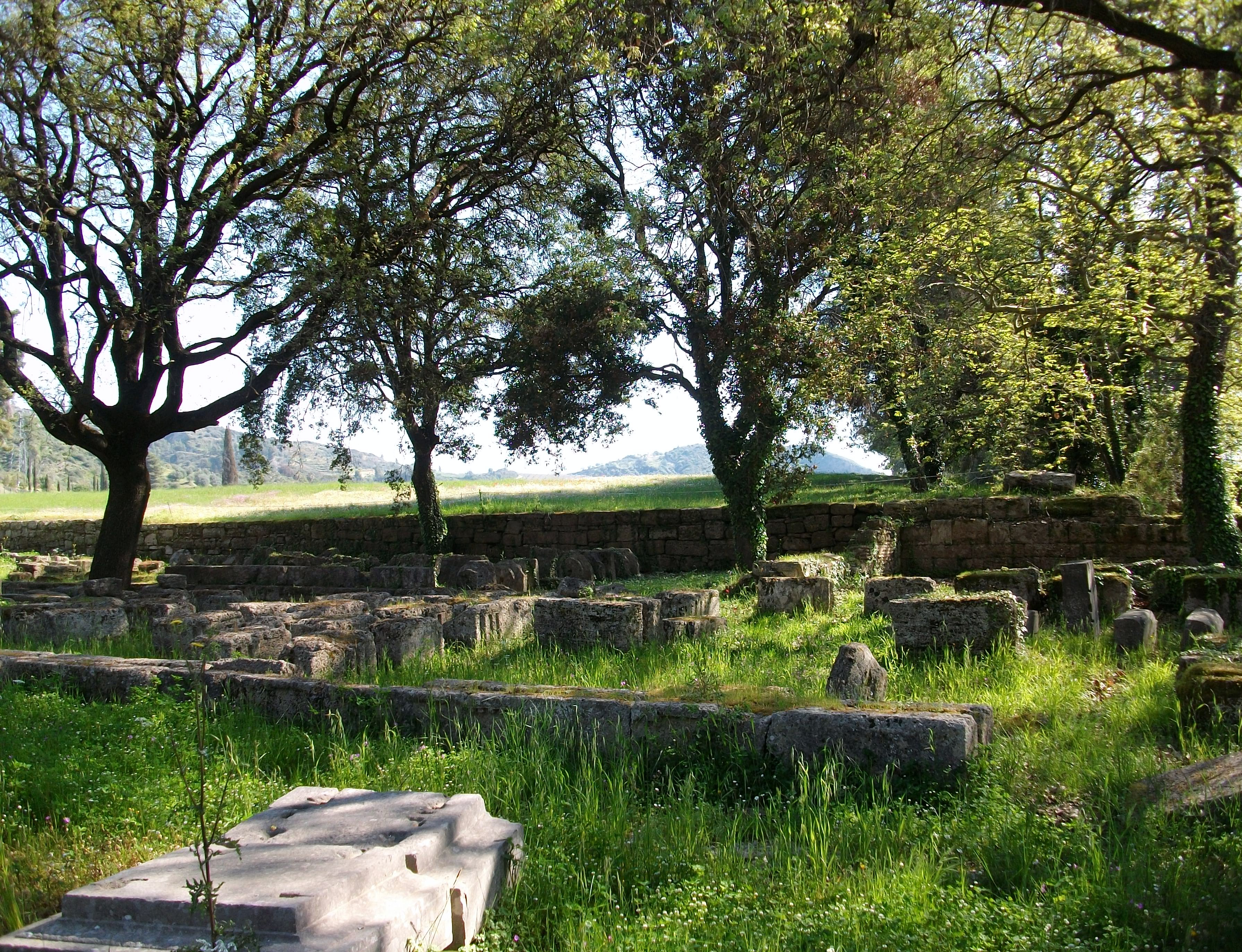
Remains of the stoa

The Echo Stoa is located within the sanctuary of Zeus in Olympia, Greece. It is part of an ancient archaeological site excavated and preserved by the German Archaeological Institute at Athens. A stoa is a covered walkway or portico, typically colonnaded and open to the public. In ancient Greece, a stoa could be used for a variety of reasons including the selling and display of goods, and religious or public meetings.

Otherwise known as the Stoa Poikile (meaning painted stoa) because of the paintings that once lined the hall, the stoa later became known as the Echo Stoa due to the acoustics of its design. It is said one word uttered, would echo seven times. "Almost 100 meters long, it was probably begun after the mid-fourth century, but not completed for a long time thereafter…" It was lined with inner and outer Doric style columns. The stadium was moved eastwards and a stoa was built to separate it from the sanctuary. "The intention is clear: it was to provide a colonnaded boundary to the sanctuary along the east side." Before the Echo Stoa, the finish line of the stadium was in full view of the temple. The structure also provided a backdrop for the penultimate stages of procession, however, this was less prominent than with the south stoa. During Hellenistic times this type of architectural layout, based heavily on view towards and from important buildings, especially with stoas became more common. "It was one of the most prominent features of the site at the time of Pausanias’ visit."

== See also ==
- Stoa Poikile

== Sources ==
1. Boardman, J. (1994). The Cambridge Ancient History (Vols. 5-6). Cambridge University Press.
2. Encyclopædia Britannica
3. Koeings, W. (1985). Die Echohalle. American Journal of Archaeology, 89(4), 708-709
4. Kunze, E. (1957). V. Bericht über die Ausgrabungen in Olympia. The Journal of Hellenic Studies, 77, 362.
5. Winter, F. E. (2006). Studies in Hellenistic Architecture. University of Toronto Press.
