= Archaeological Museum of Olympia =

Archeological museum in Greece

Coordinates: 37°38′36.30″N 21°37′45.80″E

- Αρχαιολογικό Μουσείο Ολυμπίας
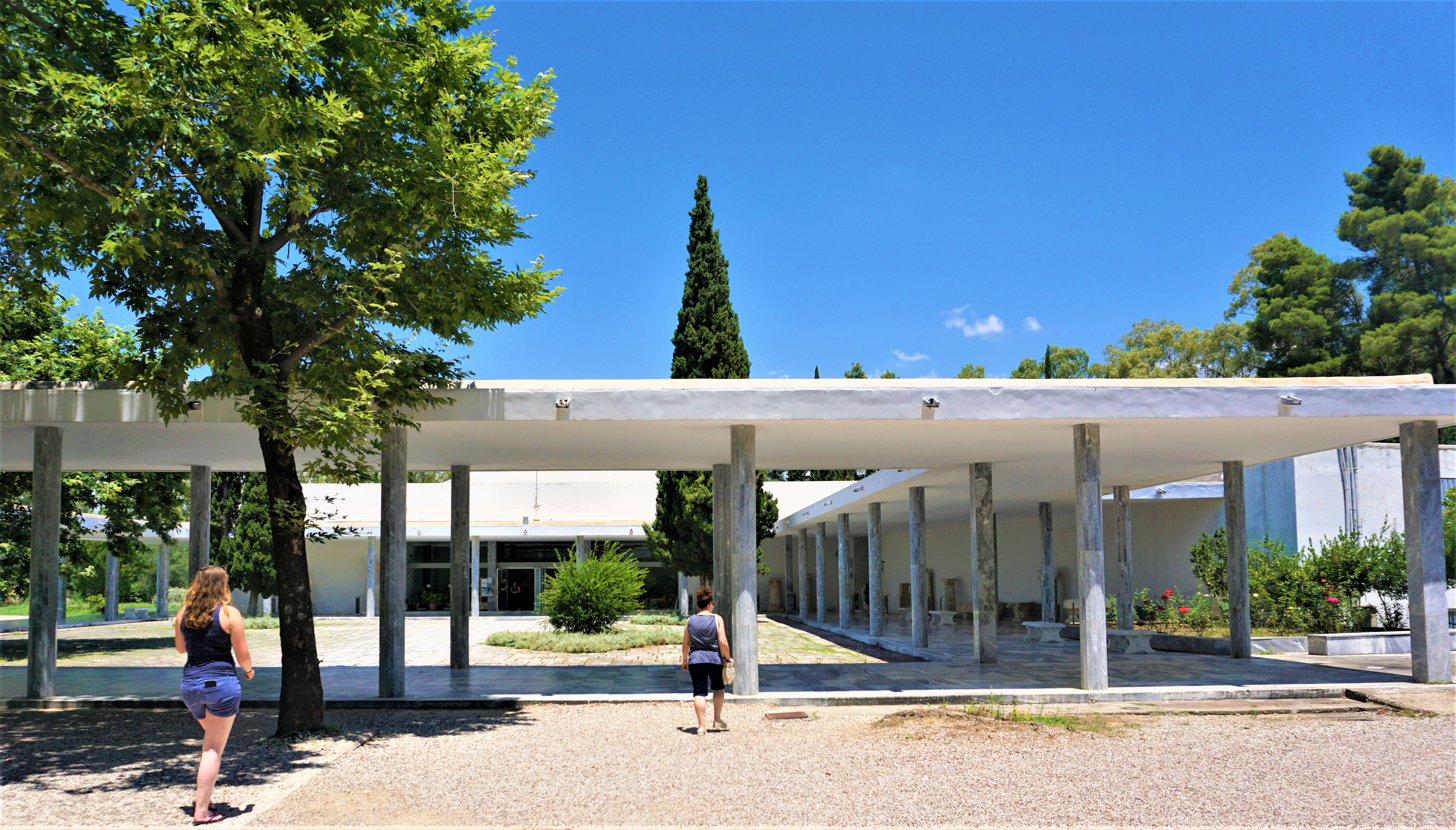
- Established: 1982 (New museum)
- Location: Ancient Olympia, Elis, Greece
- Type: Archaeological museum
- Website: ancientolympiamuseum.com

The Archaeological Museum of Olympia (Greek: Αρχαιολογικό Μουσείο Ολυμπίας) is one of the principal museums of Greece, located in Olympia. It is overseen by the Ministry of Culture and Sports, and, as of 2009, is directed by Georgia Xatzi. When the original building was completed and opened in 1888, it was the first museum in Greece outside of Athens.

The museum houses discoveries from the surrounding area, including the site of the Ancient Olympic Games. The collection includes objects produced and used in the area from prehistory to its time under Roman rule. The principal pieces in the museum are Hermes and the Infant Dionysus (attributed to Praxiteles), some objects from the Temple of Zeus, the Nike of Paionios, as well as an oenochoe that belonged to Phidias. The extent of its bronze collection makes it one of the most important in the world.

Today, the museum is housed in two buildings: the principal building with twelve rooms for exhibitions, organized both around themes and ages of the objects. The other building is dedicated to the museum store, and is separate from the main structure, located on the path to the archaeological site.

== History of the museum ==
Excavation work at Altis in the 19th century quickly necessitated the construction of a building to display unearthed objects and works of art. The banker Andreas Syggros spent 220,000 drachmas to fund the building and entrusted design and construction to two German architects and archaeologists who had begun excavating the site. Wilhelm Dorpfeld and Friedrich Adler, the architects, oversaw construction of a neo-classical building which was erected on the hill of Drouva near the road from Olympia to the sanctuary. Completed in 1888, it was the first Greek museum built outside of Athens. It was damaged in 1954 by an earthquake, and later proved too small to house and display the museum's expanding collections. Plans to build a new museum were approved in the 1970s. Although it was unused for some time, the original building was re-purposed; since 2004, it has been a museum about the history of the original Olympic games.

Some time between 1930 and 1936 a cast bronze griffin's head was taken from the museum. After passing through a number of hands it ended up in the Metropolitan Museum of Art which agreed to return it in 2025.

The Olympic flame lighting ceremony for the 2026 Winter Olympics torch relay took place on 26 November inside the museum, as weather forecasts predicted poor weather in the week of the ceremony, which was originally planned to take place at Ancient Olympia Stadium. To retain the tradition, the lighting of the flame via the sun's rays was recorded during rehearsals and was then transferred to the museum in a safety lamp, where it burned until the ceremony took place. Petros Gkaidatzis was the first torchbearer.

== Collections ==
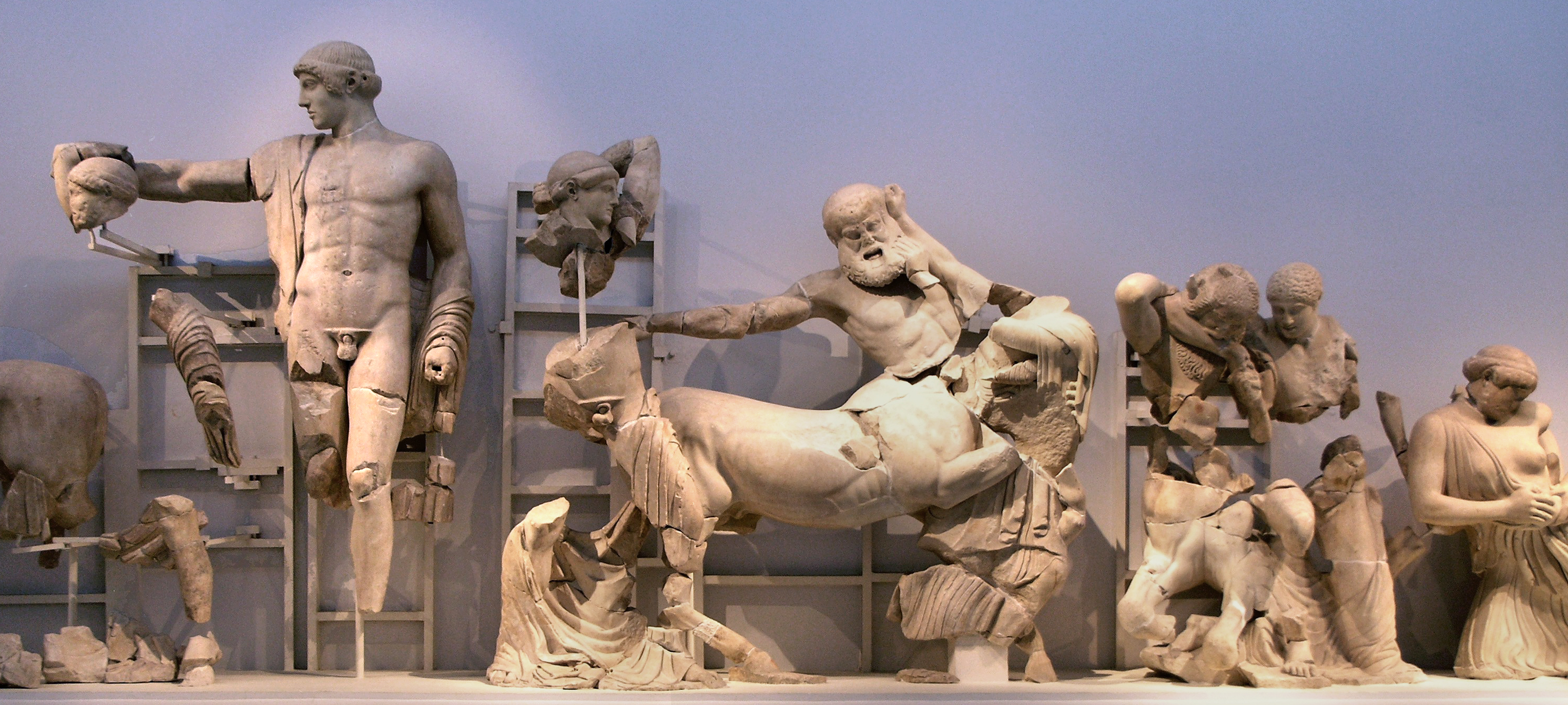
Pediment of the Temple of Zeus.

- Collection of terracottas (prehistoric, Archaic and Classical periods).
- Collection of bronzes.
- Collection of sculptures (Archaic up to the Roman periods).
- Collection from the Olympic Games.

== Notable holdings and exhibits ==
- The Hermes and the Infant Dionysus by Praxiteles (possibly)
- The Nike of Paionios by Paionios
- The Winged Gorgoneion
- Zeus carrying Ganymedes
- Pediments of the Temple of Zeus
- The helmet of Miltiades
- Miniature bronze statue of a horse
- IvO 240/241, a bronze dicus awarded to an Olympian in 241

The statue of Apollo from the west pediment of the Temple of Zeus was depicted on the obverse of the Greek 1000 drachmas banknote of 1987–2001.

== Gallery ==
Museum plan

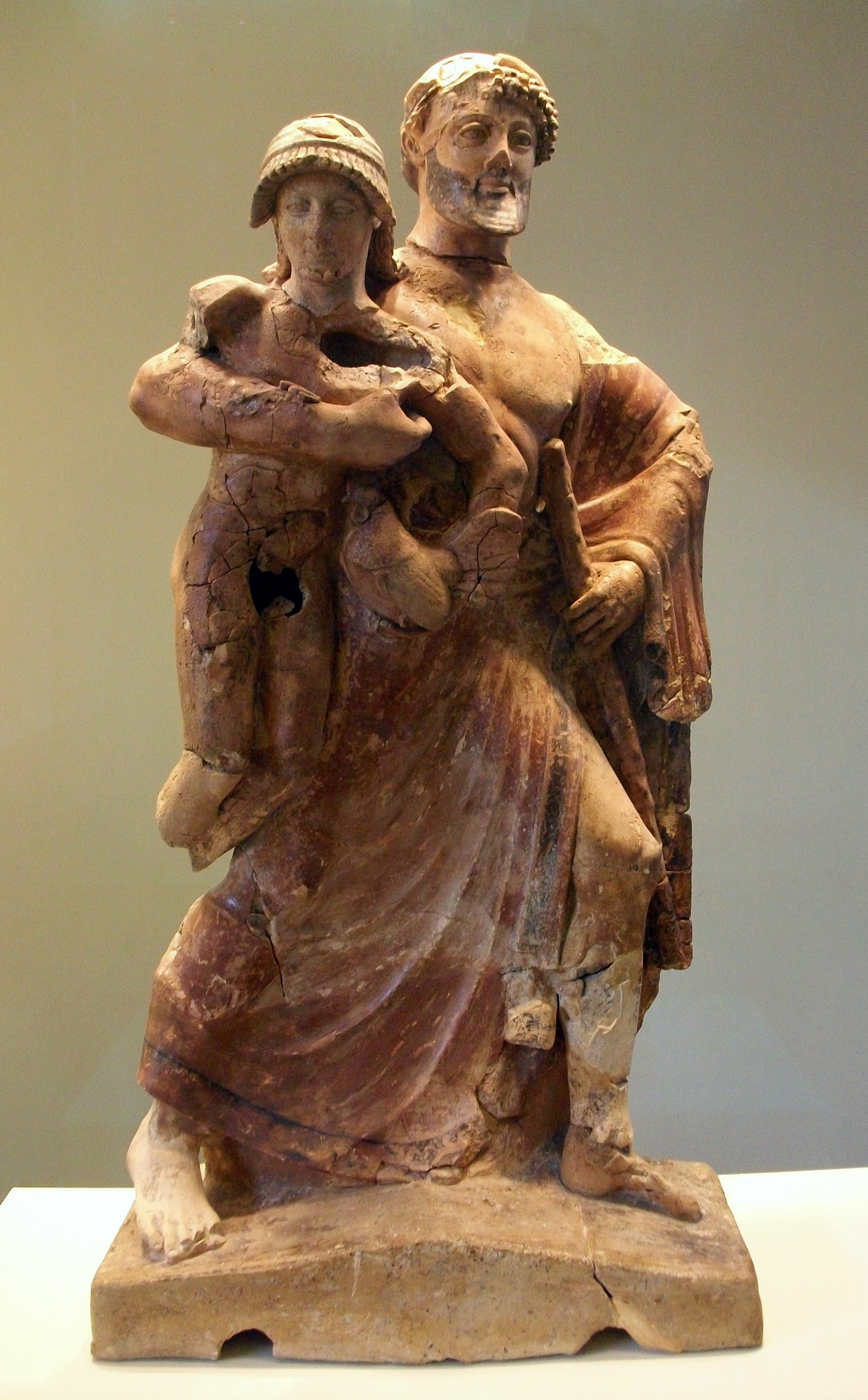
Late archaic terracotta statue of Zeus and Ganymede

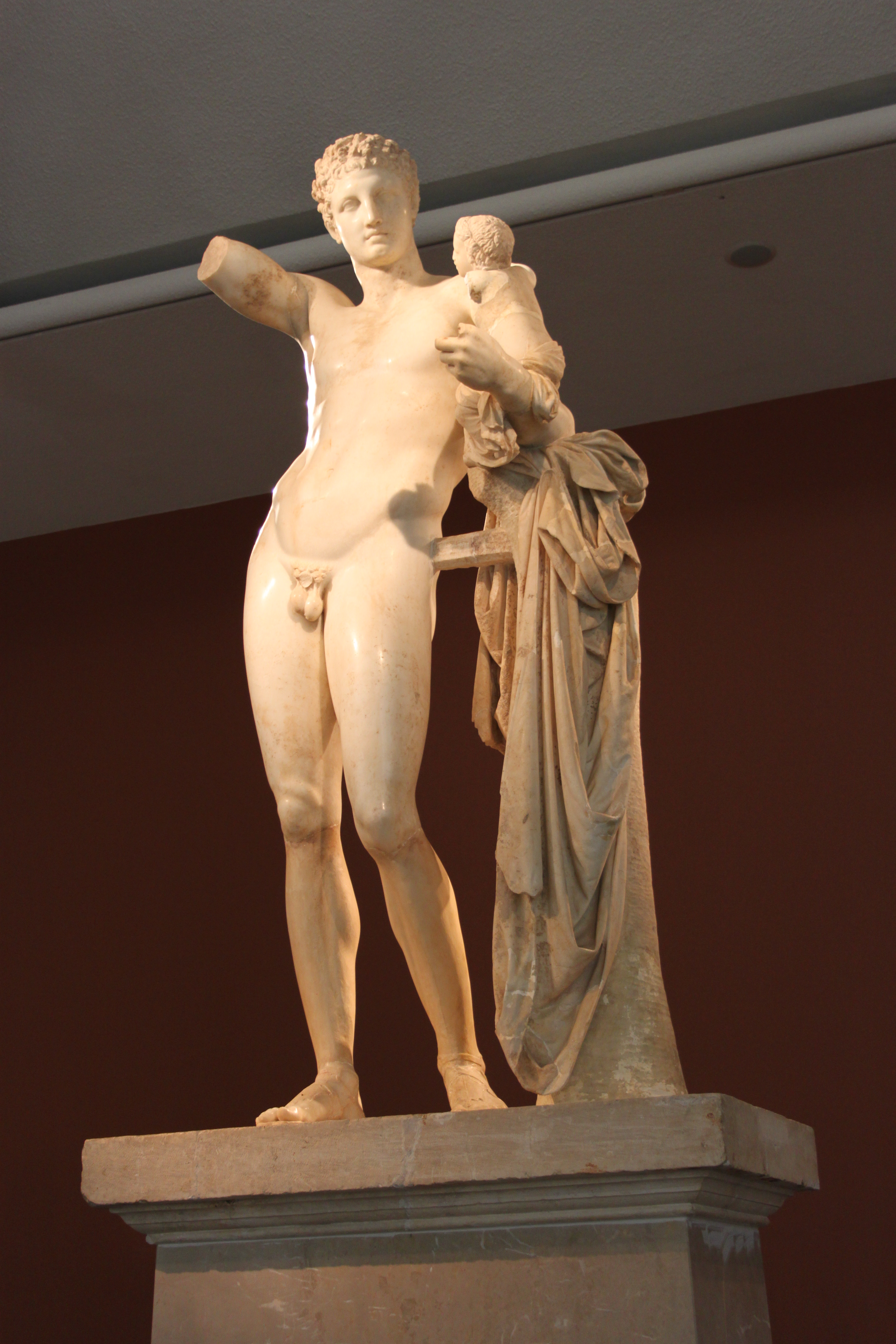
Hermes and the Infant Dionysus

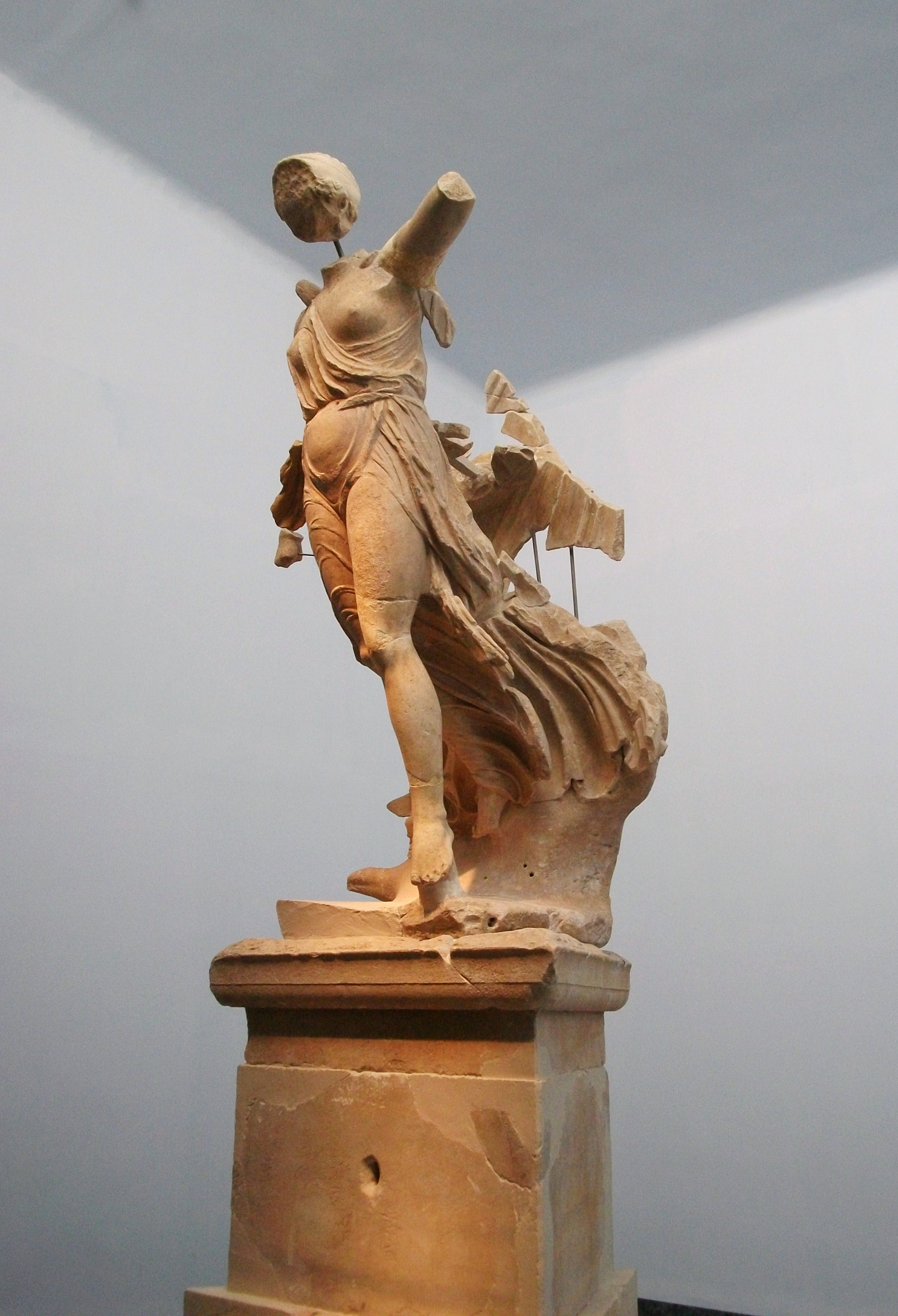
Nike of Paionios

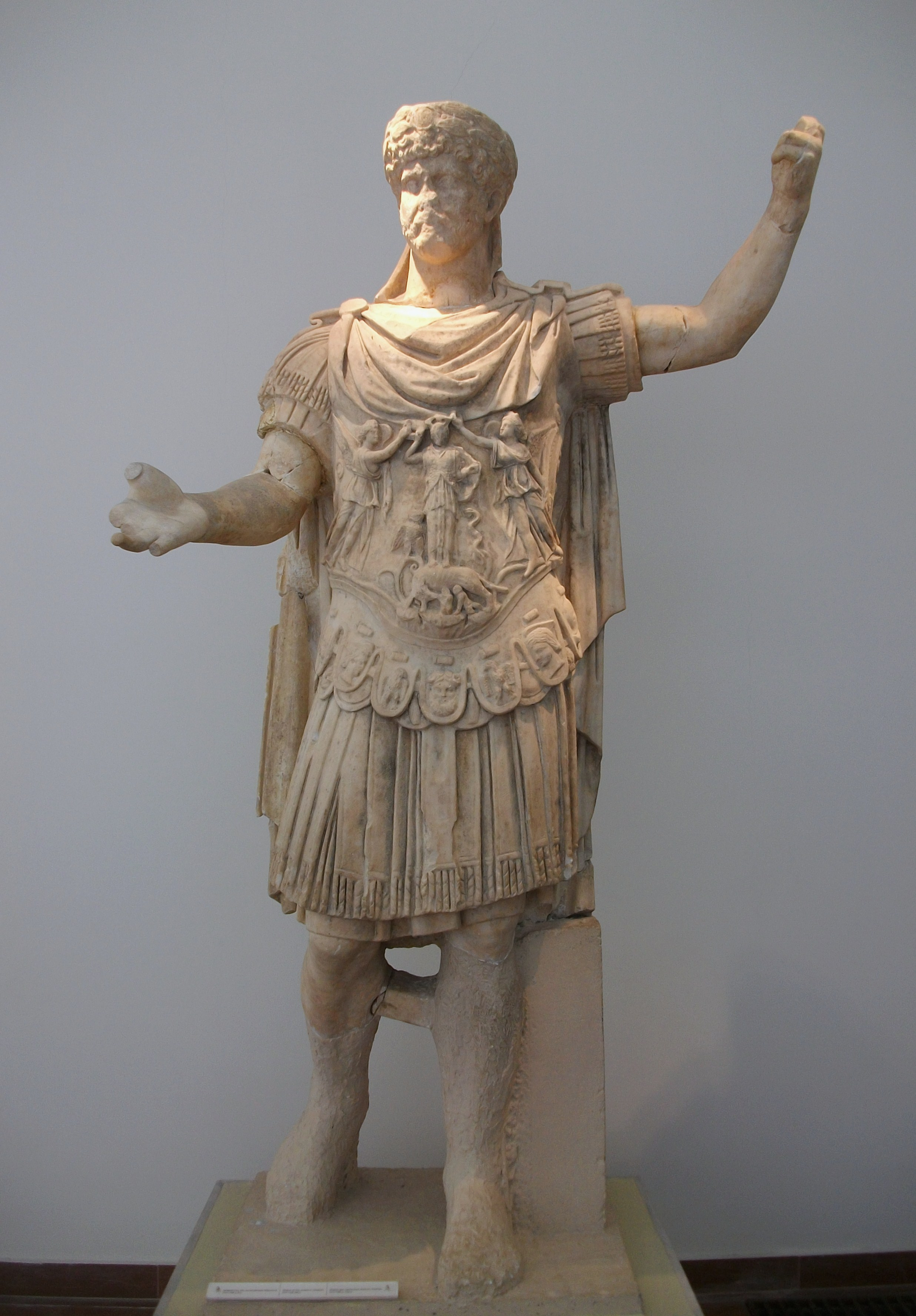
Statue of Hadrian

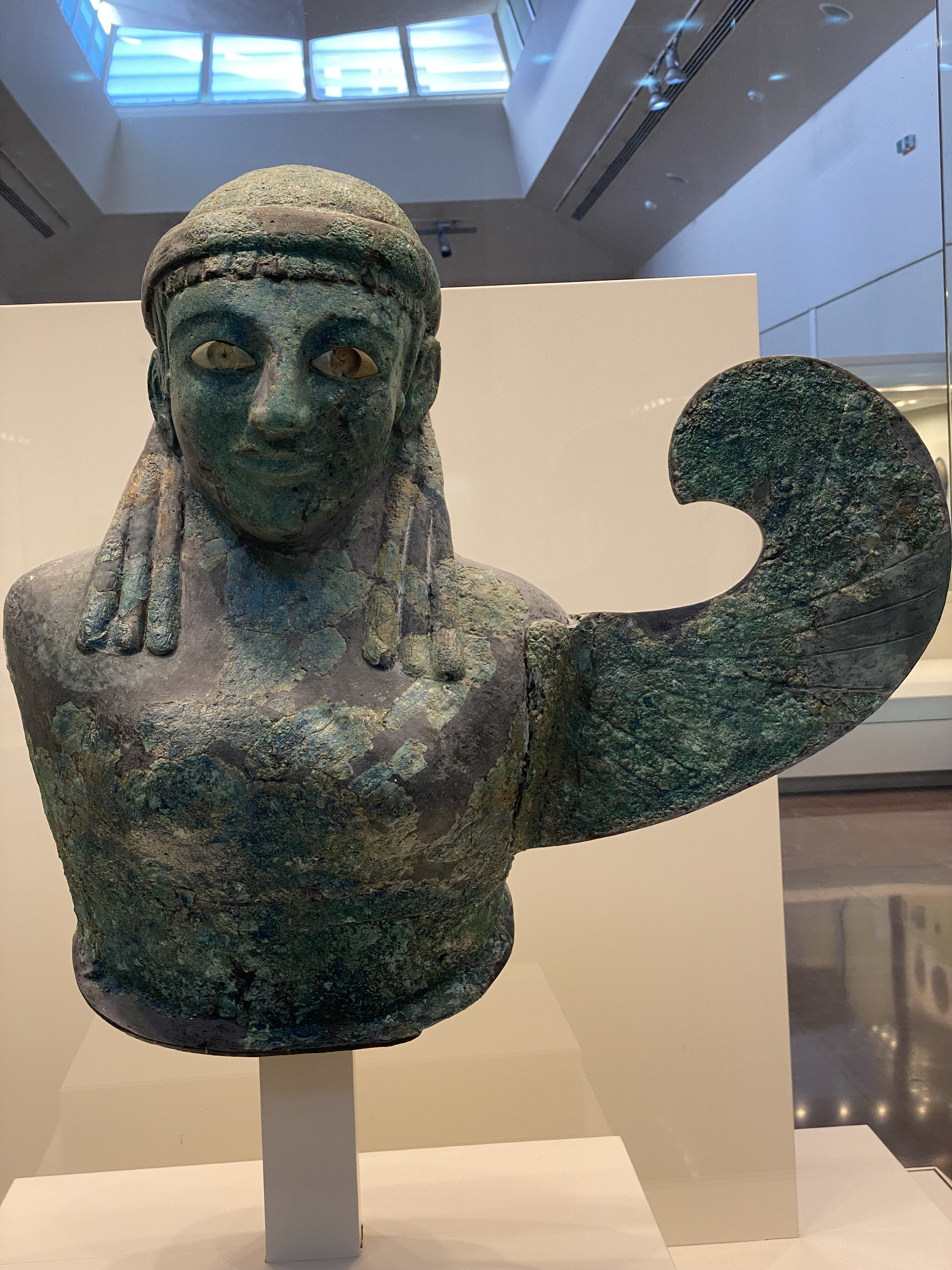
Bronze female winged figure, 590-580 BC. A rare surviving example of hammered bronze sculpture, may be Artemis, Nike or a Sphinx.

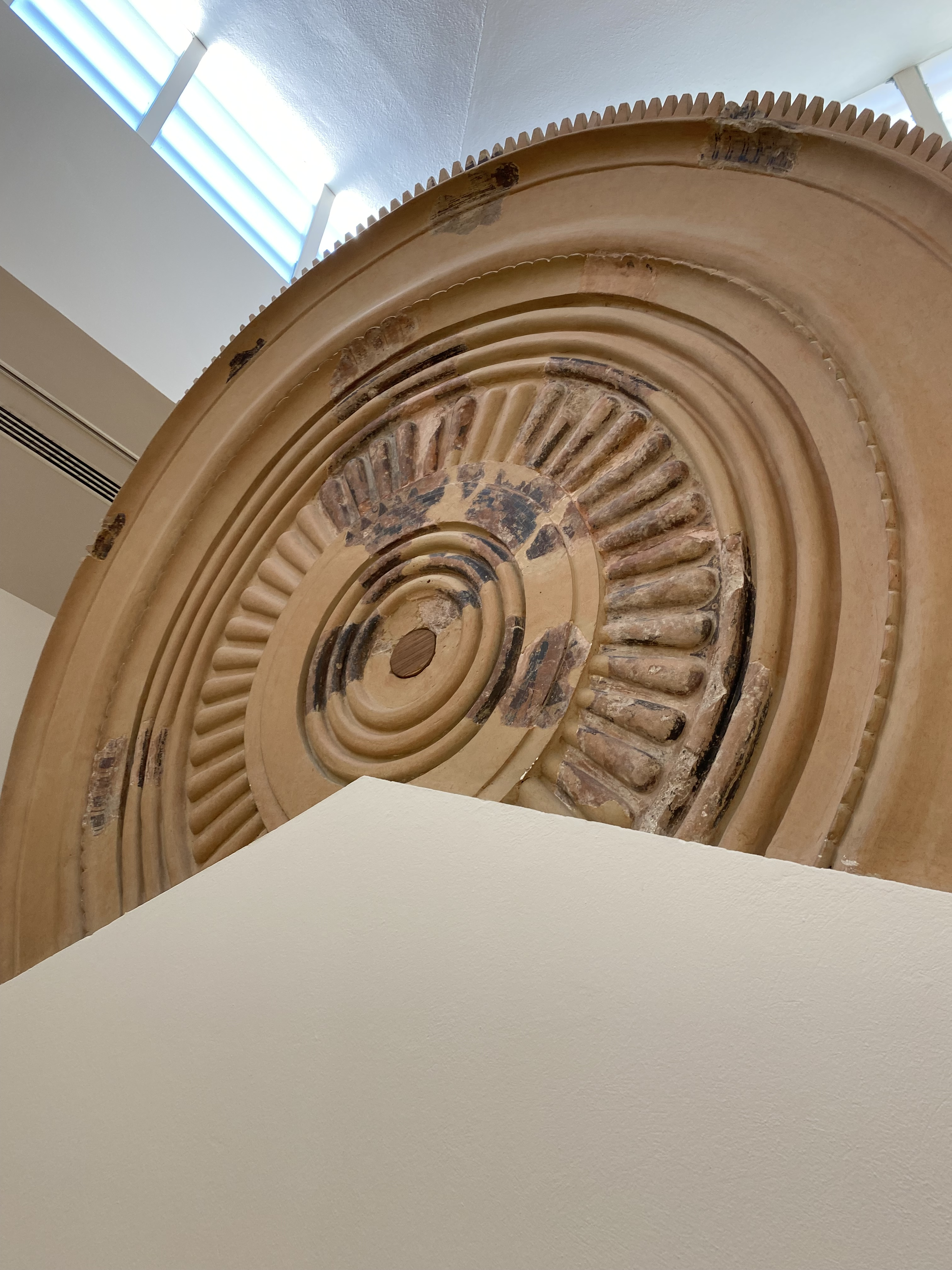
A terracotta disc which once stood at the apex of the Temple of Hera, Olympia, possibly symbolising the sun.

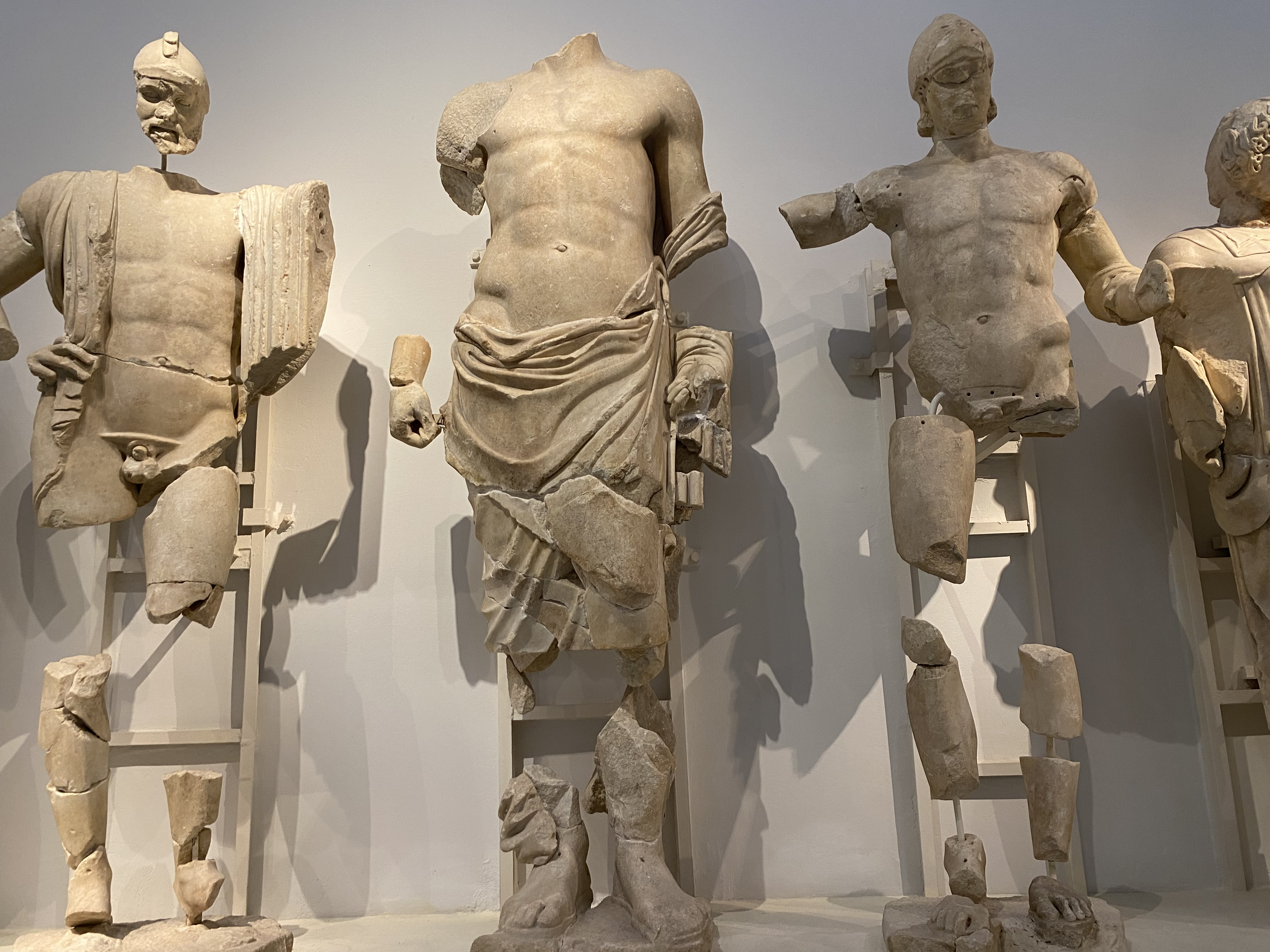
The central figures of the east Pediment of the Temple of Zeus at Olympia. The main figure is Zeus, to his left is Pelops and to his right is Oinomaus in a chariot race.

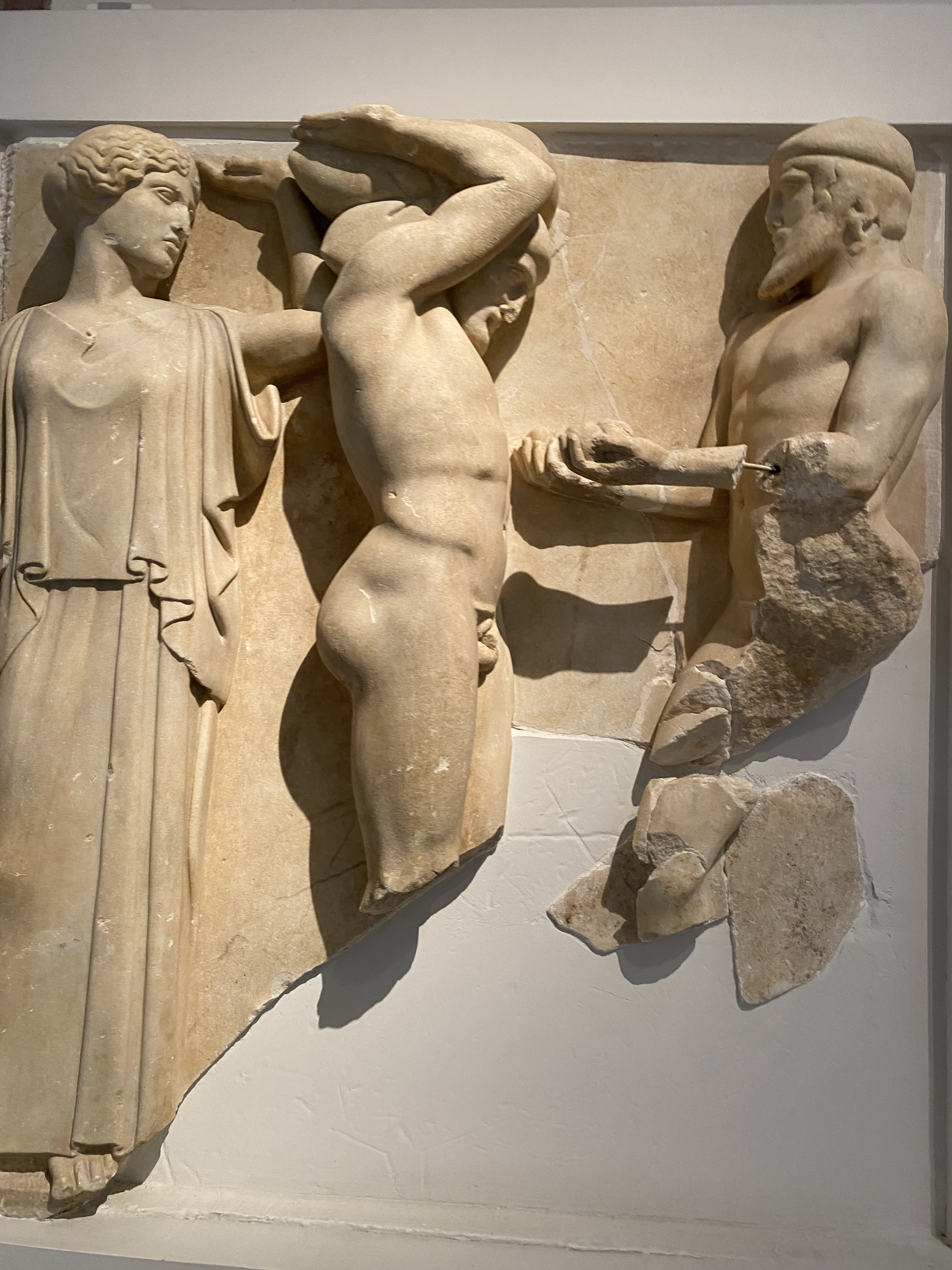
Metope from the Temple of Zeus, depicting the 11th labour of Hercules. In front of Hercules is Atlas and behind is Athena.

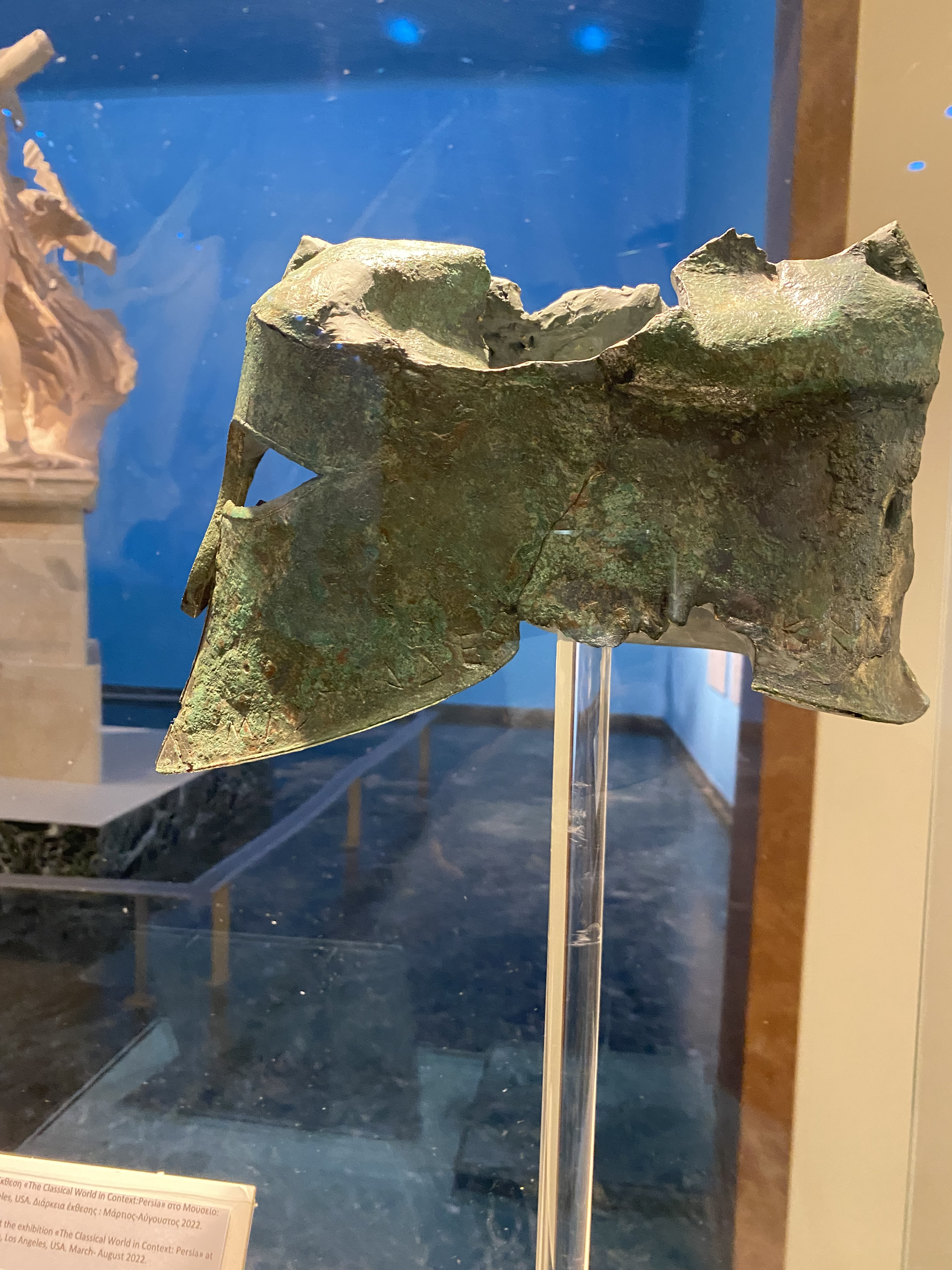
Helmet of Miltiades, 490 BC.

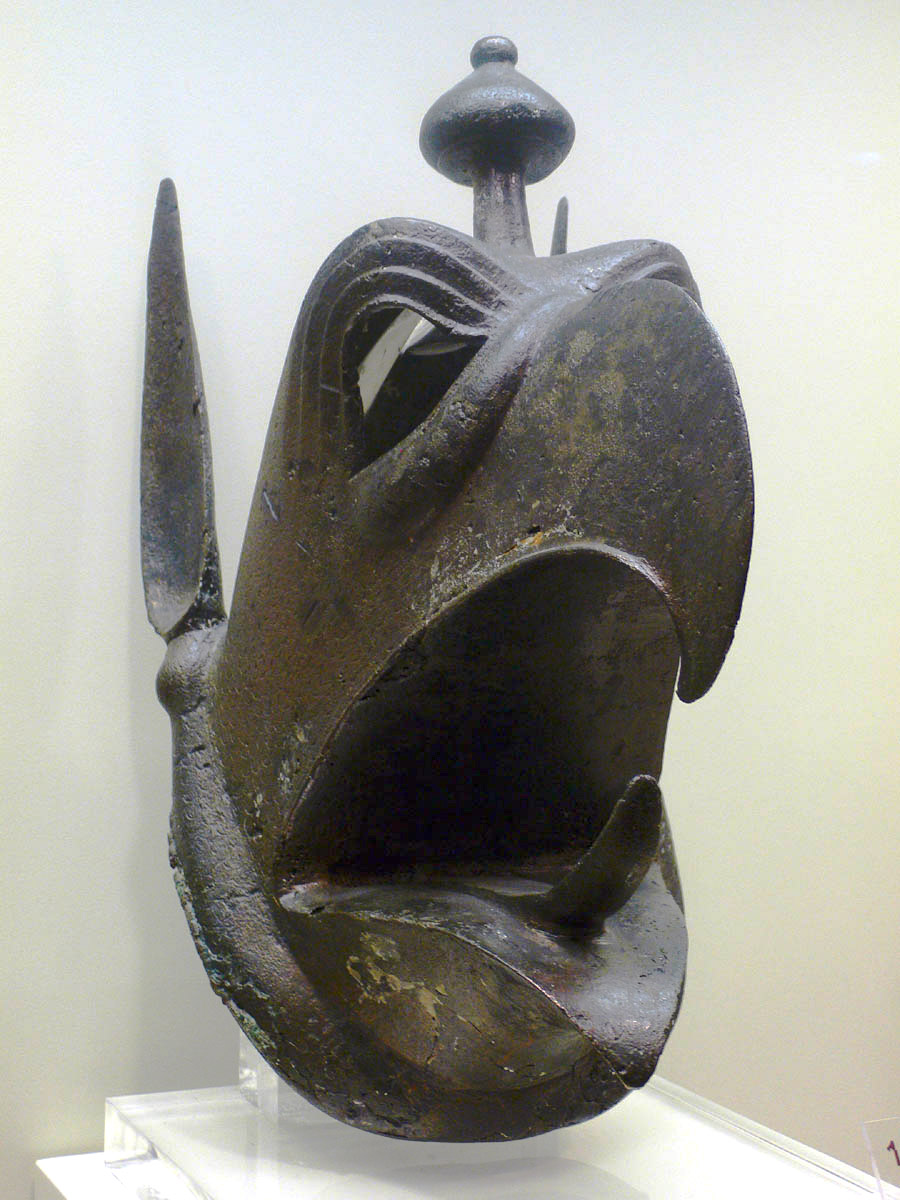
Bronze griffin head, 7th century BC.

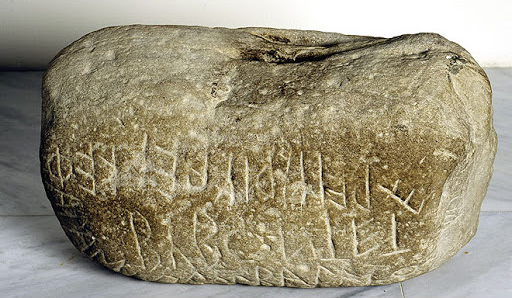
The Bybon sandstone, early 6th century BC

== See also ==
- Ancient Olympia
- Ancient Olympic Games
- List of museums in Greece
- Praxiteles
- Statue of Zeus at Olympia
