= Treasuries at Olympia =

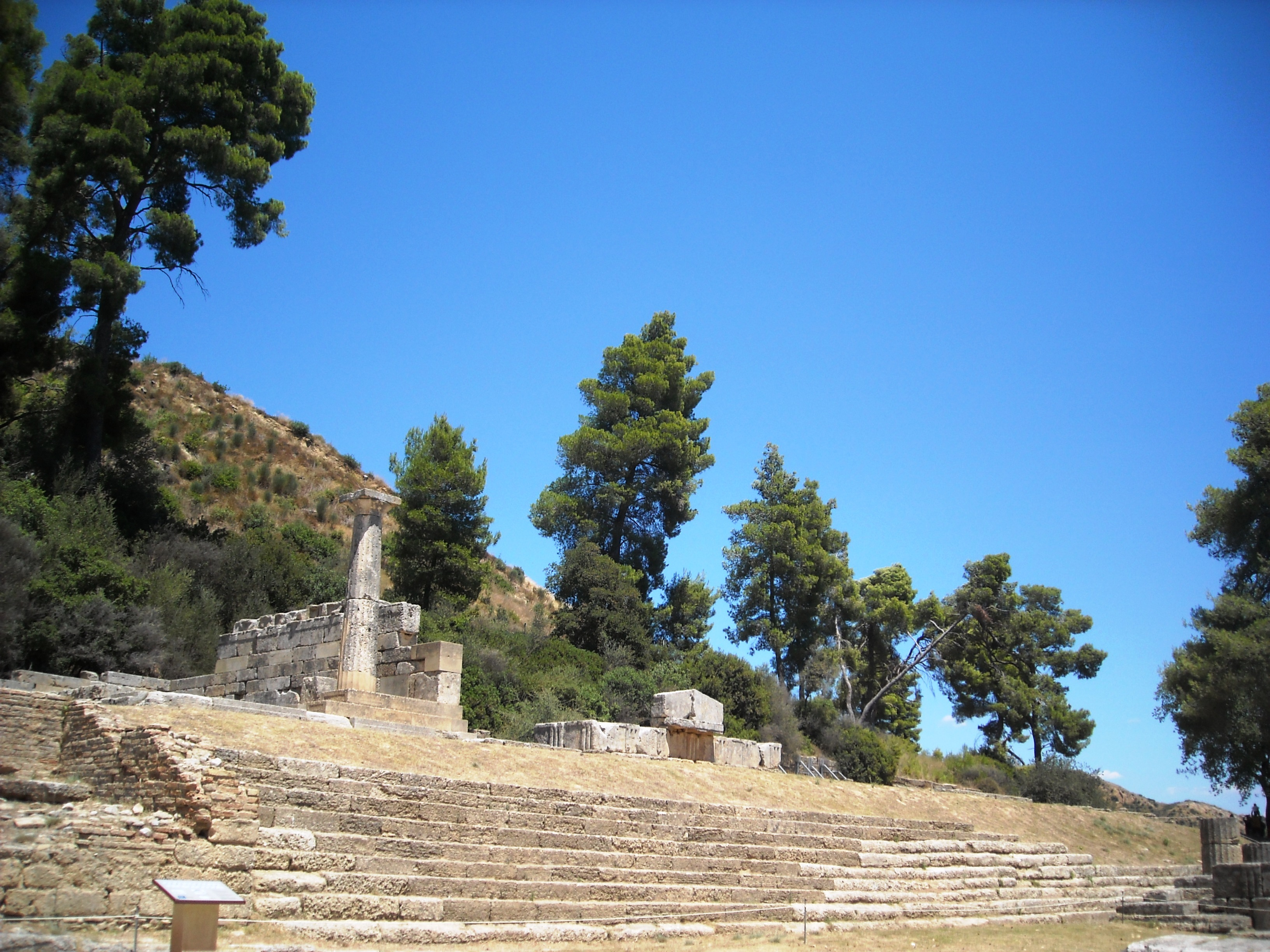
Treasuries at Olympia

The Treasuries at Olympia were a series of small temple-shaped buildings located to the north side of the Altis or sanctuary at the site of Olympia in Greece. All but two were erected by Greek colonies to store valuable votive offerings.

The Treasuries were built on a natural terrace at the foot of the Hill of Cronus. The best preserved and earliest treasury is that dedicated by Sicyon. The most recent treasury discovered is that of Syracuse. It was built to celebrate the victory over Carthage in 480 BC.

West to east the treasuries were dedicated by: Sicyon, Syracuse, Byzantion, Sybaris, Cyrene, Selinus, Metapontium, Megara and Gela.

The miniature buildings consist of a single room preceded by a small entrance-hall with two columns, like a small temple. It was holding valuable offerings, including items won in war.

== See also ==
- Megarian Treasury (Olympia)
- Treasuries at Delphi
