= Pelopion =

Shrine of Pelops at Olympia, Greece

Coordinates: 37.6386°N 21.6297°E

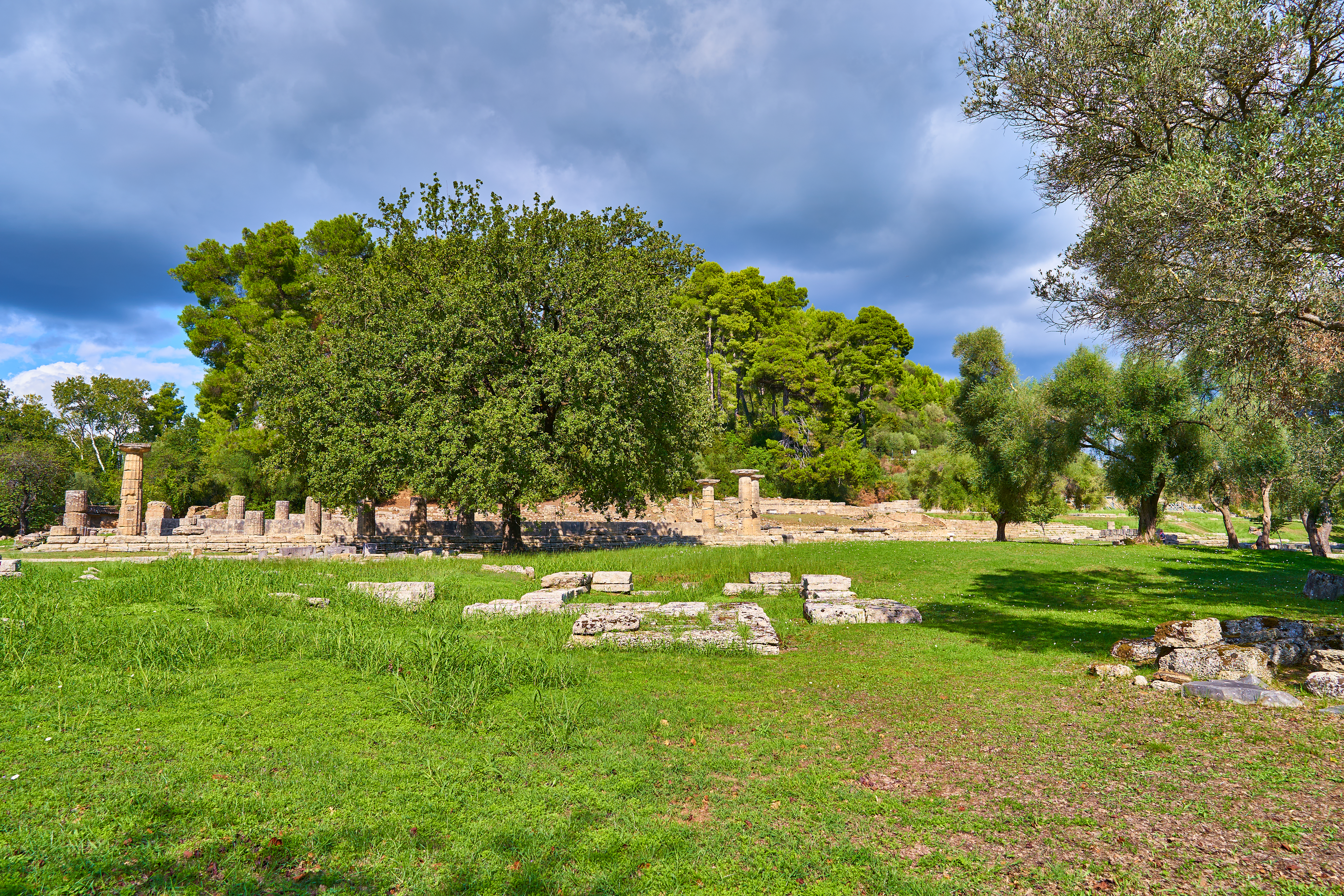
Remains of the Pelopion in Olympia

The Pelopion was a structure at the ancient site of Olympia, Greece. It was the alleged tomb of Pelops, a figure in Greek mythology. It was a monument surrounded by a pentagonal structure. The tomb became an altar for animal sacrifices in Archaic Greece and continued to serve as an altar into the Roman era, until it fell into disuse with the advent of Christianity. It consisted of a mound of ashes and compacted earth, at the peak of which the sacrifice would take place – a black ram was sacrificed here every year in honor of Pelops. In order to get to the top of the altar, priests would carve steps into the mound. This packed earth form of altar was a particularly ancient one, quite unlike the more modern stone altars such as those evidenced at Delphi and the Acropolis of Athens.
