= Leonidaion =

Coordinates: 37.6369°N 21.6292°E

Leionidaion at southwest corner of Olympia sanctuary

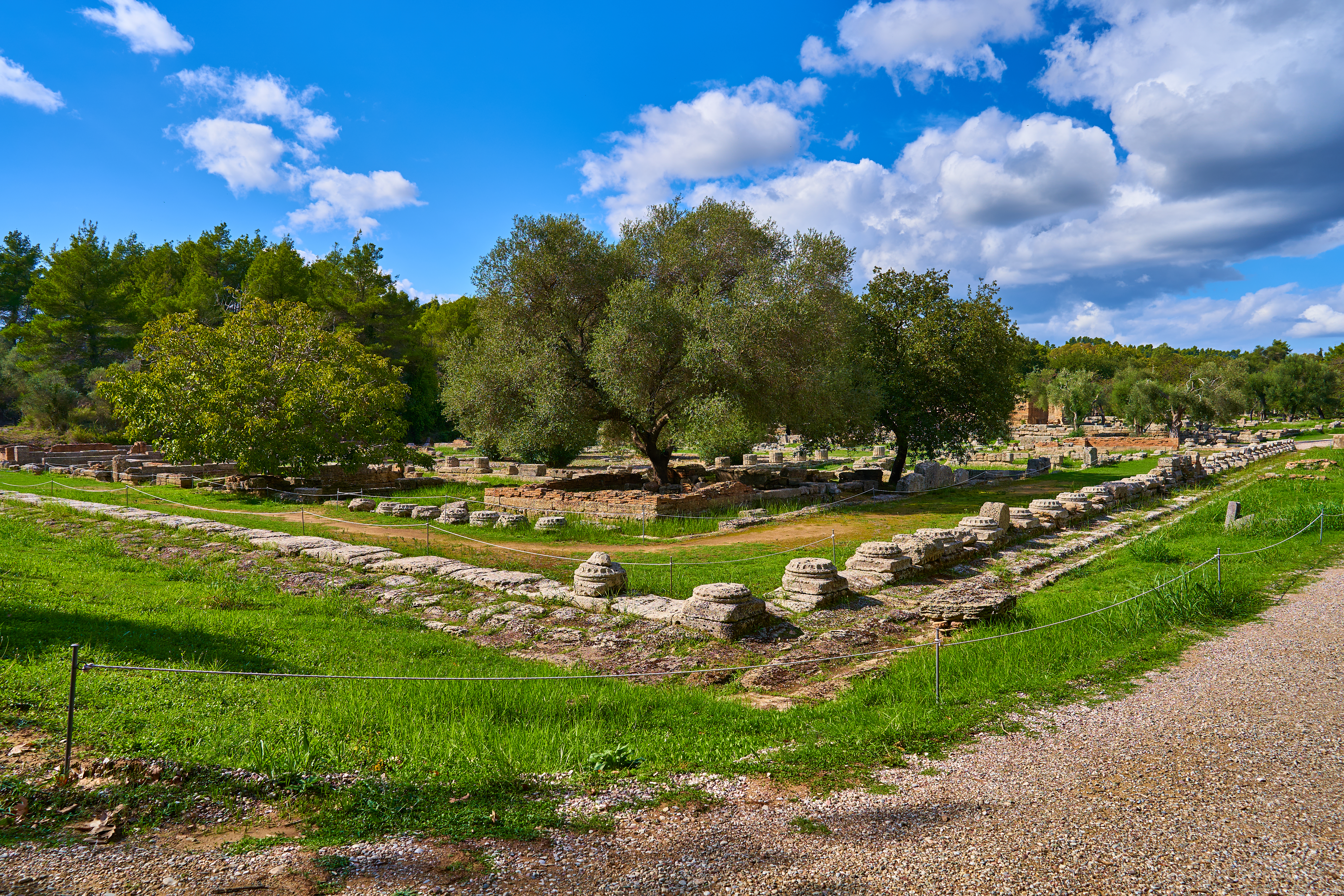
The remains of the Leonidaion (2020)

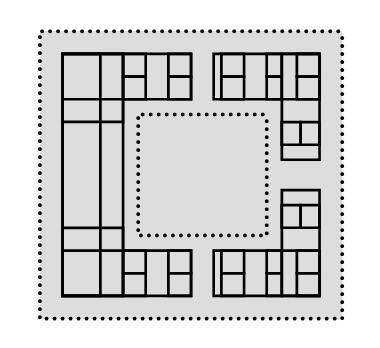
Floor plan of the Leonidaion

The Leonidaion (Λεωνιδαίο) was the lodging place for athletes taking part in the Olympic Games at Olympia. It was built around 330 BCE at the southwest edge of the sanctuary, and was the largest building on the site. It was funded, designed by, and named after architect Leonidas of Naxos.

The building consisted of four Ionian colonnades with 138 decorated columns. The exterior formed a roughly square of 37 by 34 columns approximately 80 metres to a side. In its interior there was a central Doric peristyle with 44 columns, 12 to a side.

In the late third century AD the still utilised Leonidaion was destroyed in an earthquake and its wreckage used in the construction of the Late Antique wall built to protect the site from the Herules.
