= Megarian Treasury (Delphi) =

Ancient building at Delphi

The Megarian Treasury was a building situated within the sanctuary of Apollo in Delphi, to the north of the Siphnian Treasury along the Sacred Way. On its façade have been inscribed 26 inscriptions referring to the citizens of Megara, a fact which led to the secure identification of the monument.

== Description ==
Within the archaeological site of Delphi, in the sanctuary of Apollo, along the Sacred Way and to the north of the Siphnian Treasury are preserved architectural remains of a building which has been identified as the treasury of the Megarians. The building consists of two parts. The earlier phase dates to the end of the 6th or the beginning of the 5th century BC. It was a building of the Doric order, made of porous stone, possibly distyle in antis. The building had a vestibule 2 meters long and a cella of 5 meters. Parts of the foundation were maintained, but at a later stage, possibly in the 5th or in the beginning of the 4th century BC, there was erected a second building of a trapezoid plan. Its façade was made of dark limestone. Inscriptions were carved on it, mostly honorary, of which the majority (26 in number) refer to the city and the citizens of Megara. In 1975–76 the Wall of the Megarians and part of the building was restored at the expense of the Municipality of Megara.

== See also ==
- Megarian Treasury (Olympia)

== Bibliography ==
- Bommelaer, J.-F., Laroche, D. (1991). Guide de Delphes: Le Site. Paris, pp.126–127.
