= Megarian Treasury (Olympia) =

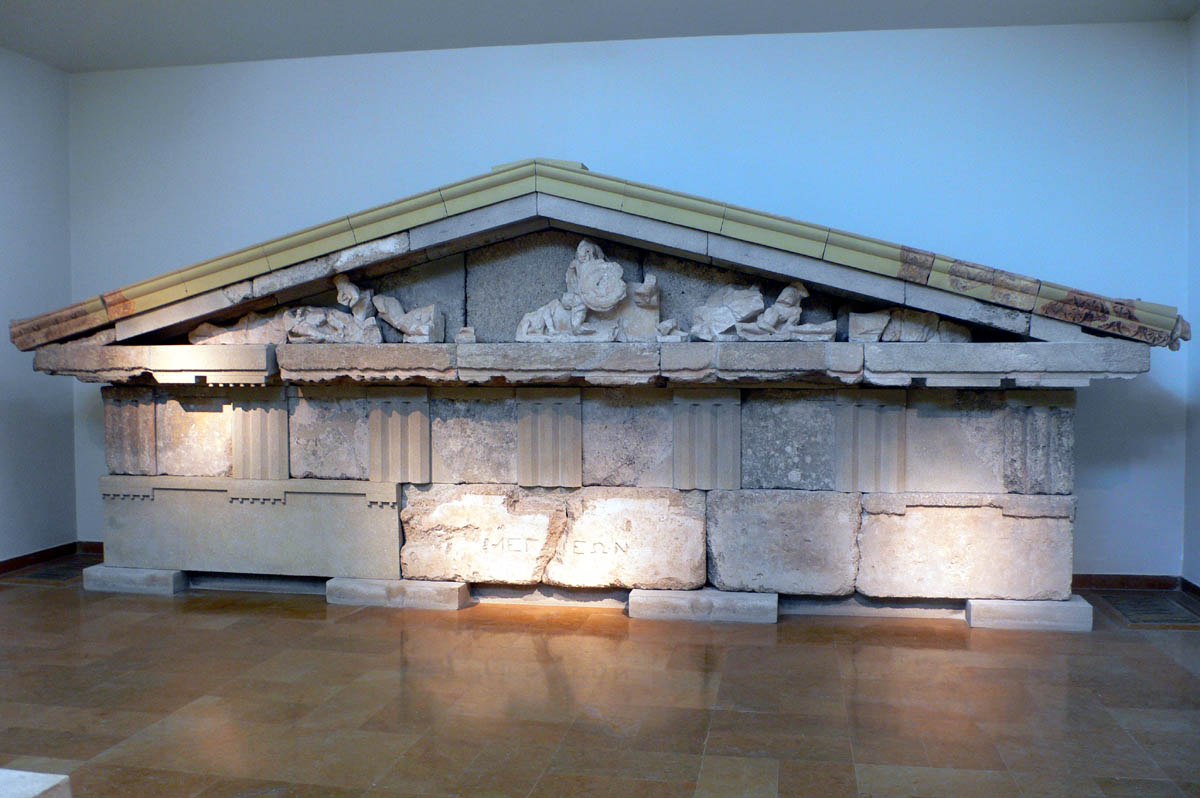
Pediment of the Megarian Treasury, 520 BC. Archaeological Museum of Olympia

The Megarian Treasury at Olympia, was an ancient Greek building, located in the sanctuary of Olympia, which held votive offerings of the Greek city-state of Megara.

== Architecture ==
The Megarian Treasury was mainly built from limestone, with the roof made of terracotta tiles. The building was adorned with several statues, including limestone reliefs and carvings in cedarwood. Due to its architectural styling, both the statues and the building itself are believed by archaeologists to originate from the 500s BCE.

== See also ==
- Treasuries at Olympia
- Megarian Treasury (Delphi)
