= Alfred Mallwitz =

German architect (1919–1986)

Alfred Mallwitz (2 October 1919, Berlin – 17 March 1986, Vaterstetten) was a German architect. From 1953 he was architect to the German Archaeological Institute excavations at Olympia, leading them from 1972 to 1984. From 1978 to 1980 he also led major excavations south-east of Olympia.
