= Comparative navy officer ranks of the European Union =

Rank comparison chart of all navies of the European Union member states.

== Officers (OF 1–10) ==
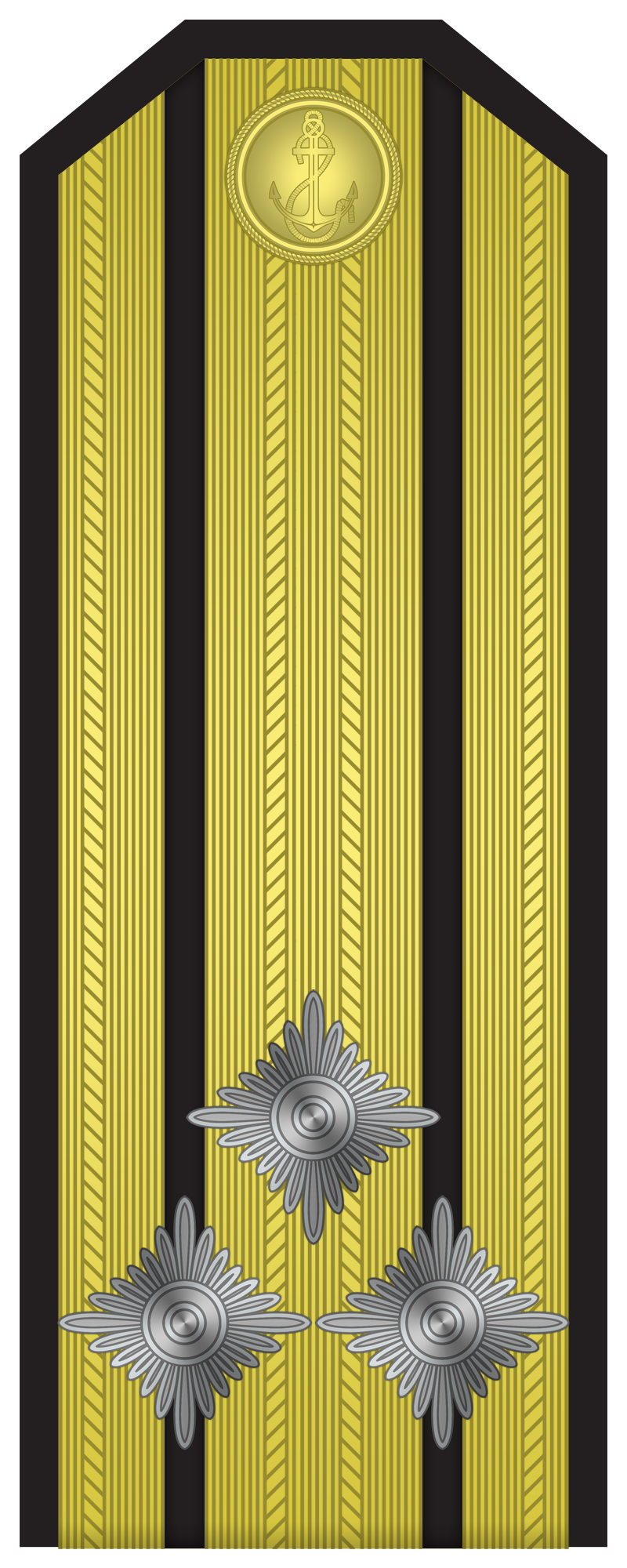
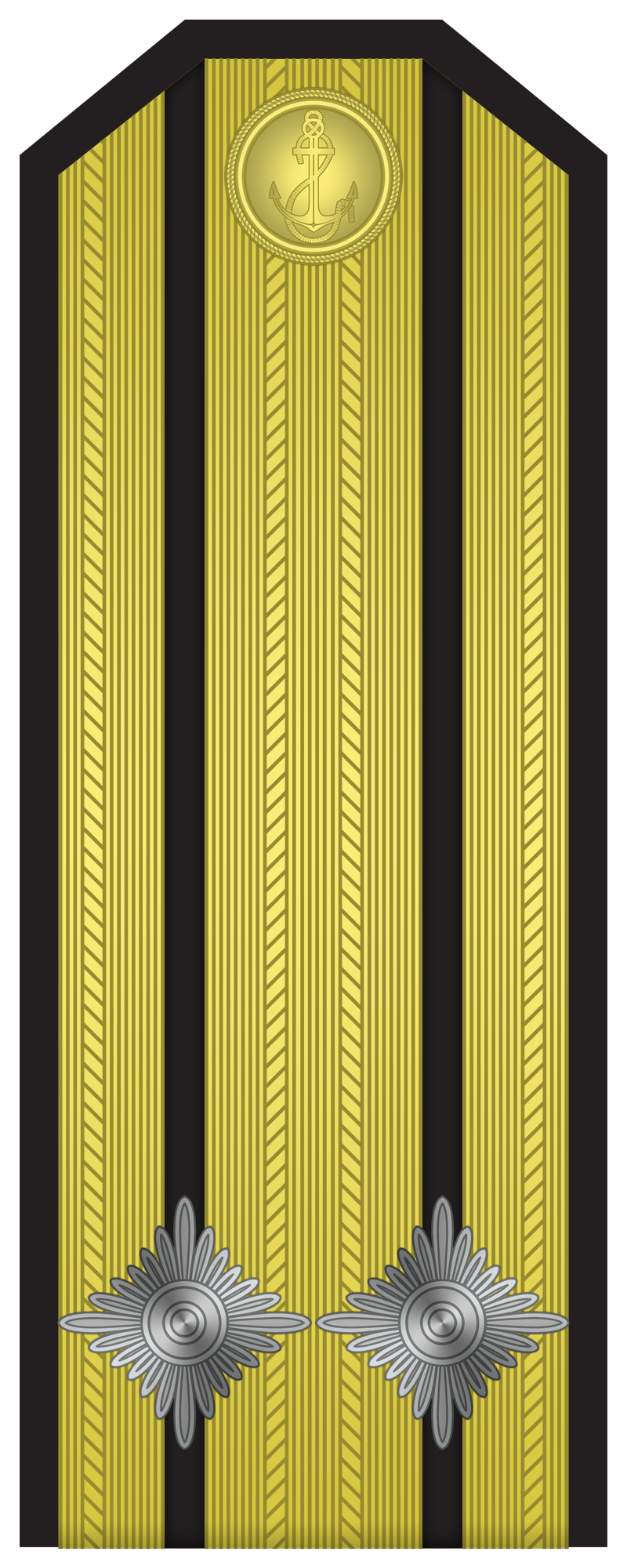
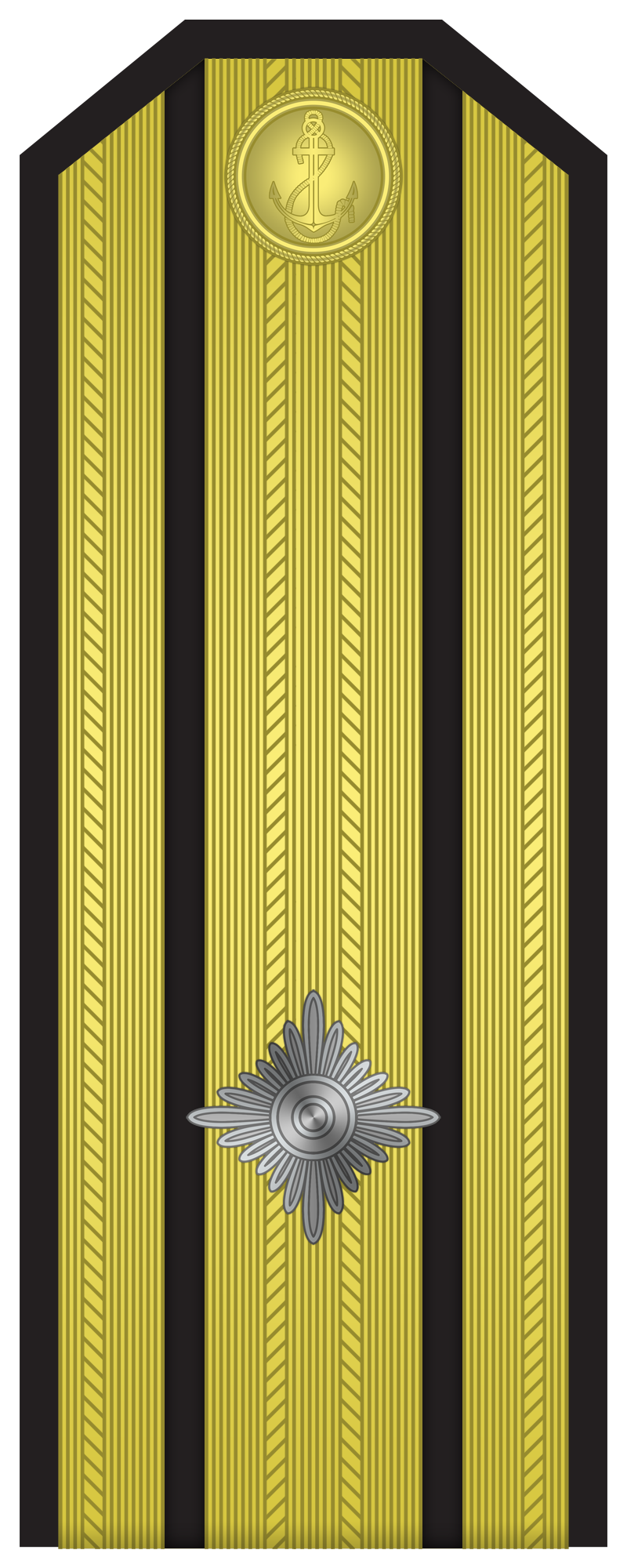
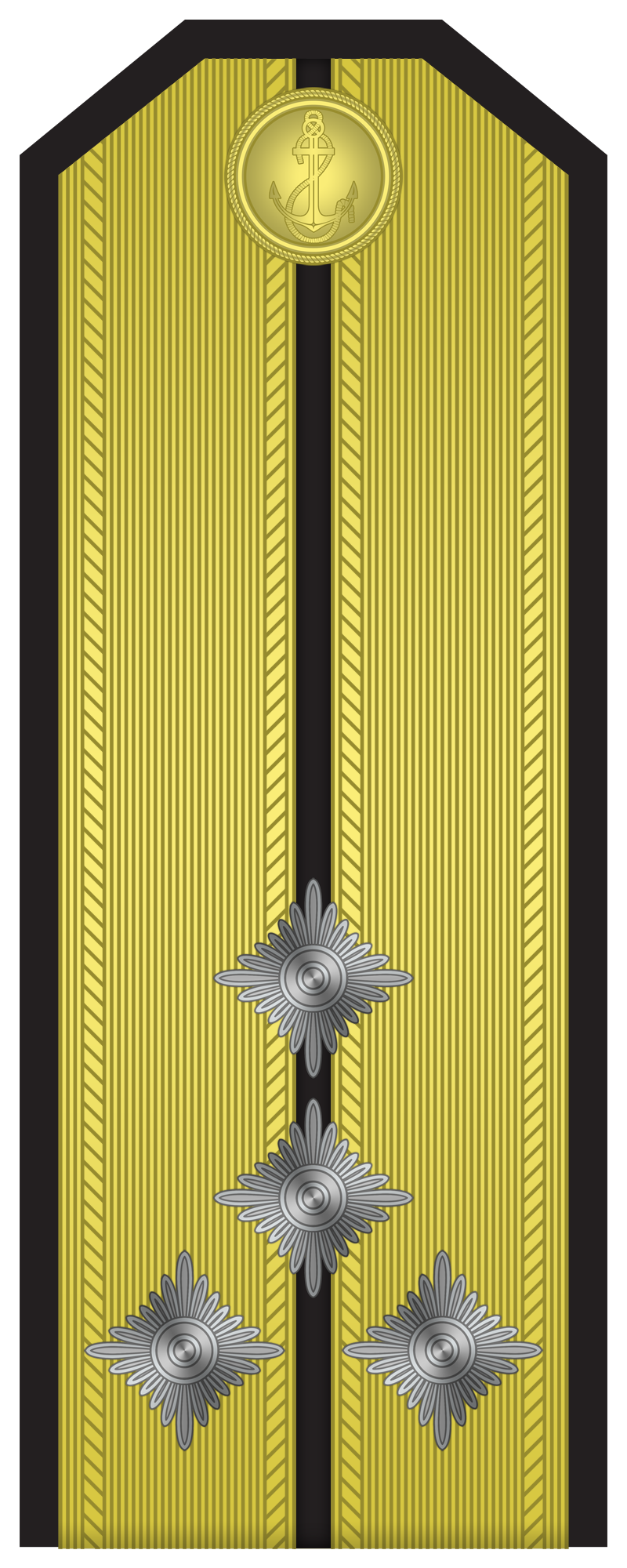
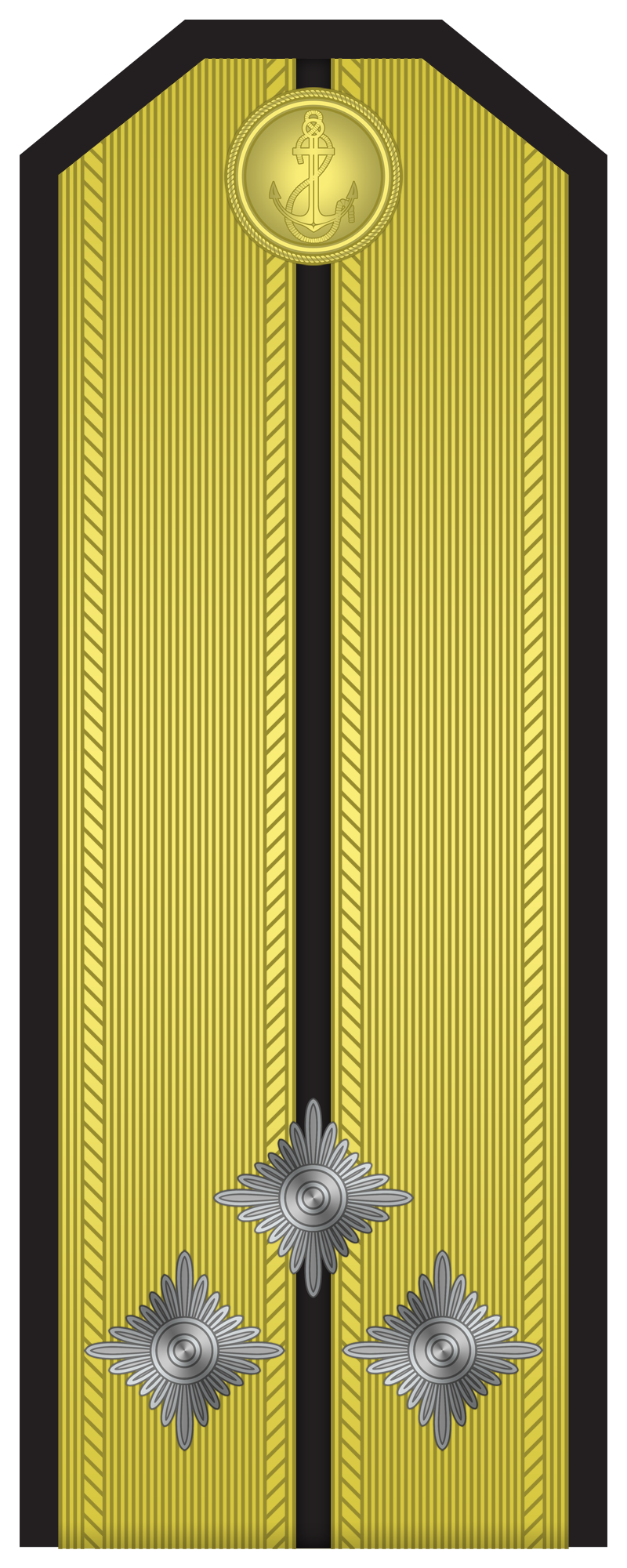
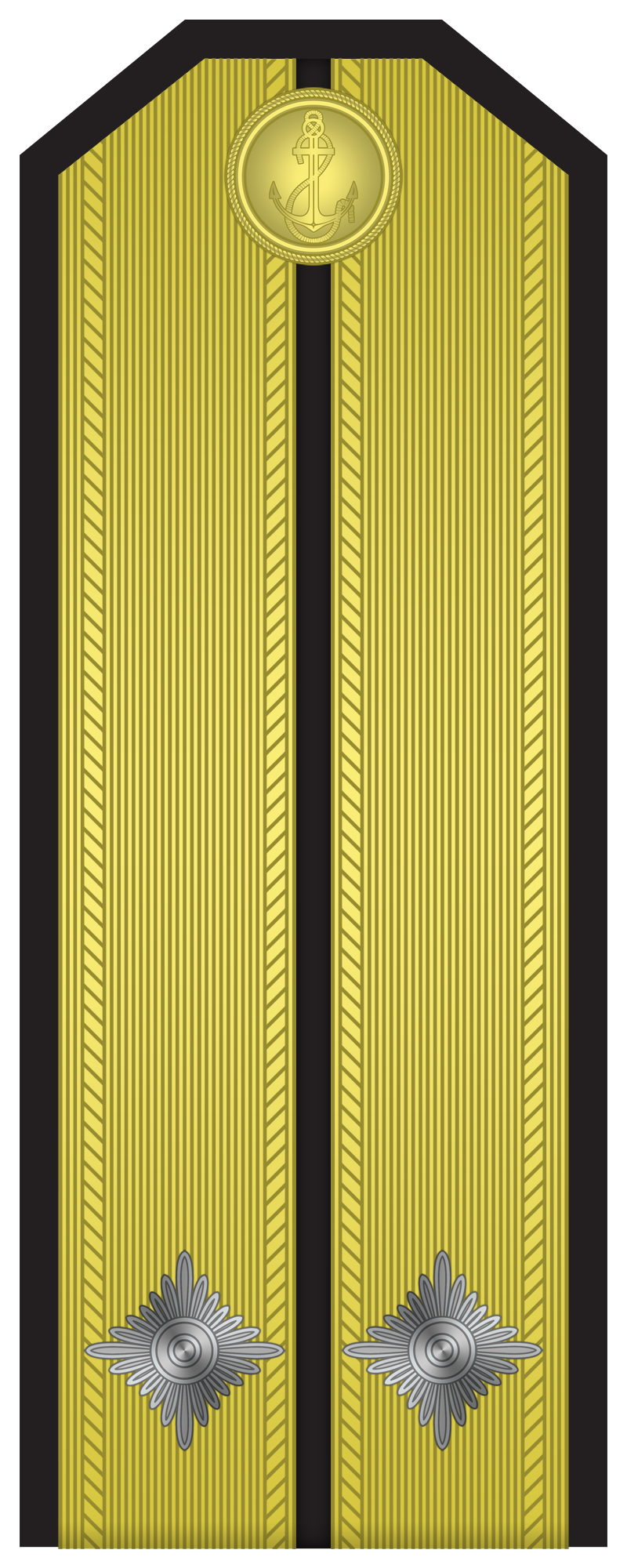
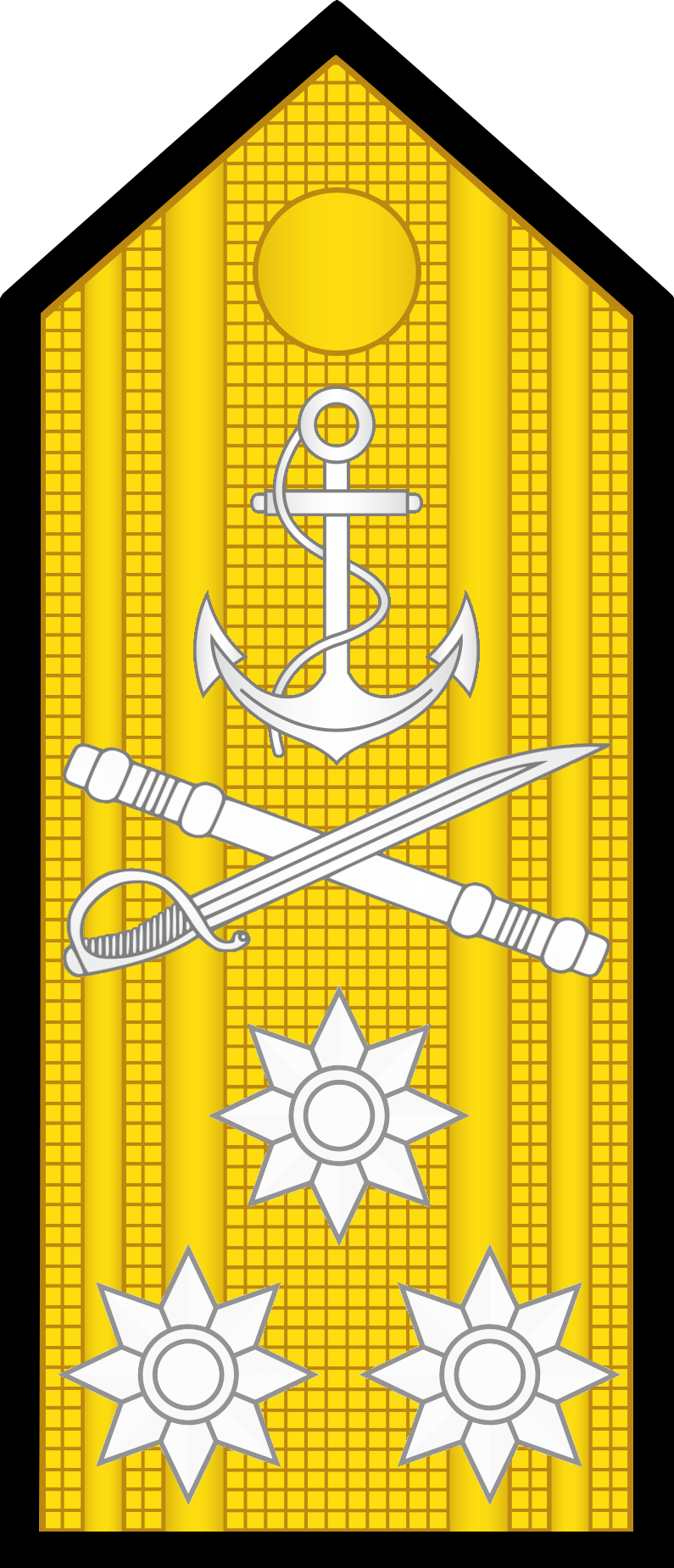
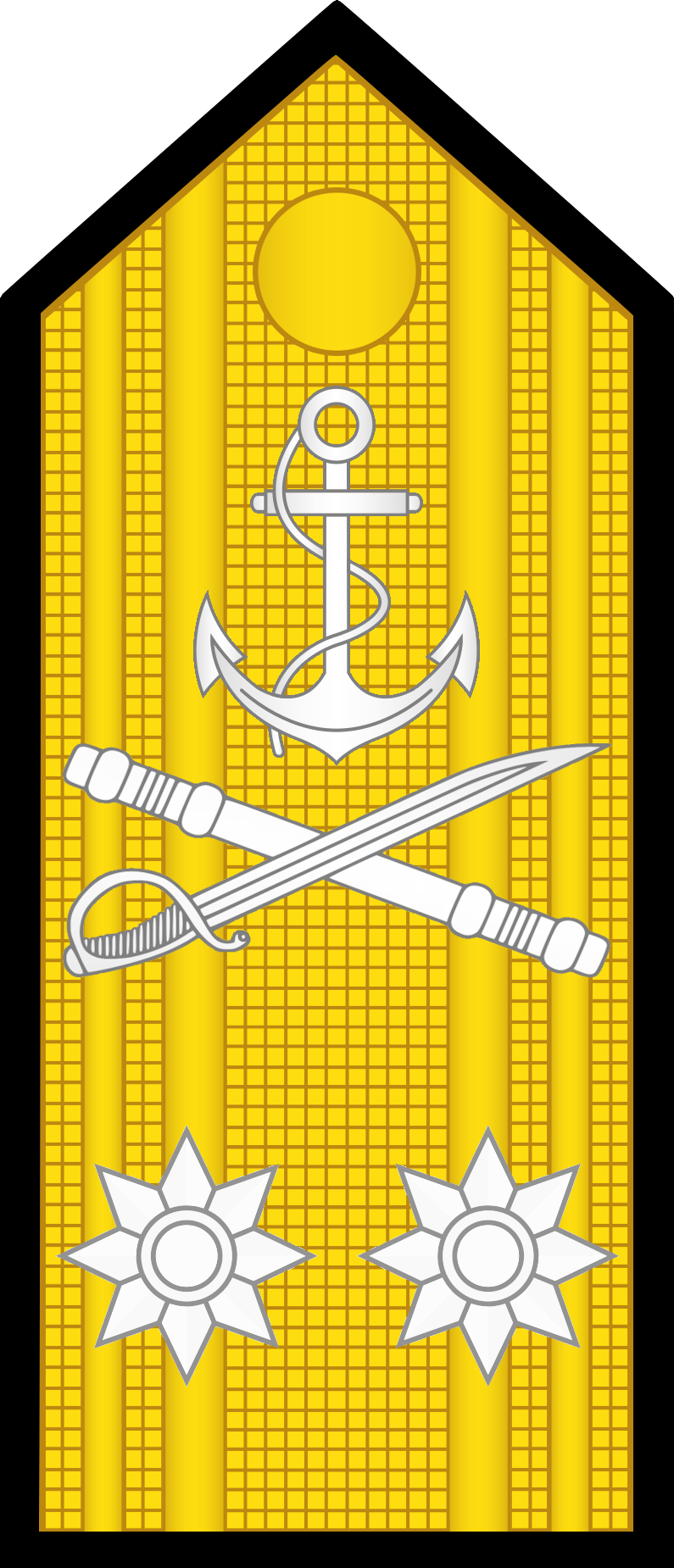
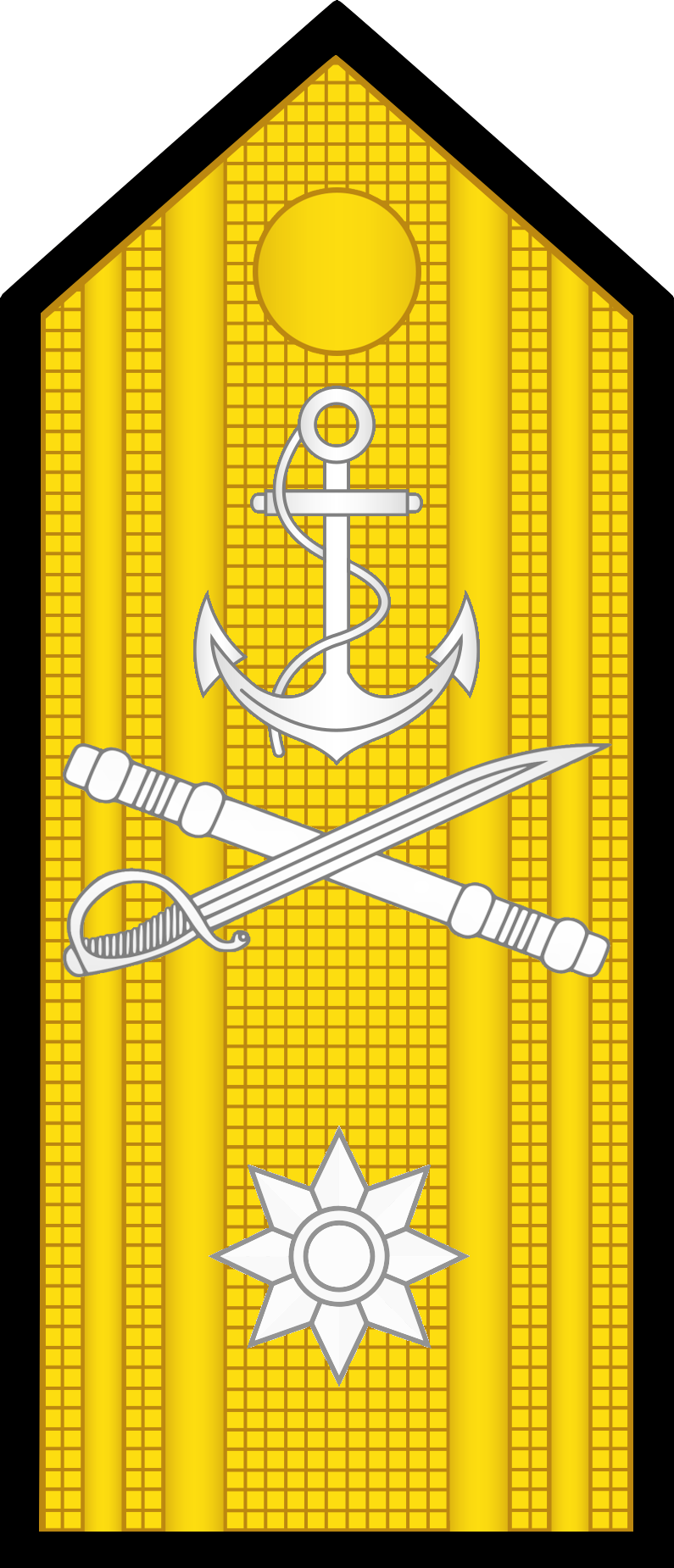
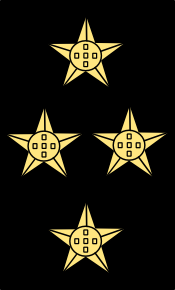
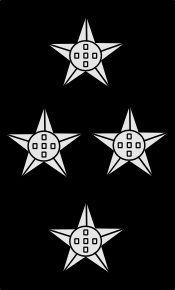
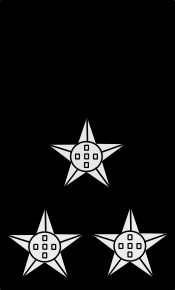
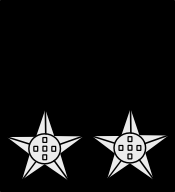
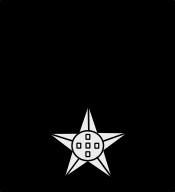
Rank group	General / flag officers					Senior officers				Junior officers
Austria	No navy
Belgian Navy
Belgian Navy		Admiraal	Vice-admiraal	Divisieadmiraal	Flottieljeadmiraal	Kapitein-ter-zee	Fregatkapitein	Korvetkapitein	Luitenant-ter-zee 1ste klasse	Luitenant-ter-zee		Vaandrig-ter-zee		Vaandrig-ter-zee 2de klasse
Belgian Navy		Amiral	Vice-amiral	Amiral de division	Amiral de flottille	Capitaine de vaisseau	Capitaine de frégate	Capitaine de corvette	Lieutenant de vaisseau de 1^{re} classe	Lieutenant de vaisseau		Enseigne de vaisseau		Enseigne de vaisseau de 2^{e} classe
Belgian Navy		Admiral	Vizeadmiral	Divisionsadmiral	Flotillenadmiral	Kapitän zur See	Fregattenkapitän	Korvettenkapitän	Linienschiffsleutnant 1. klasse	Linienschiffsleutnant		Seefahnrich		Seefahnrich 2. klasse
Bulgarian Navy
Bulgarian Navy		Адмирал; Admiral	Вицеадмирал; Vitseadmiral	Контраадмирал; Kontraadmiral	Флотилен адмирал Flotilen admiral	Капитан I ранг Kapitan I rang	Капитан II ранг Kapitan II rang	Капитан III ранг Kapitan III rang		Капитан-лейтенант; Kapitan-leytenant		Старши лейтенант Starshi leĭtenant		Лейтенант; Leytenant
Croatian Navy
Croatian Navy	Admiral flote	Admiral	Viceadmiral	Kontraadmiral	Komodor	Kapetan bojnog broda	Kapetan fregate	Kapetan korvete		Poručnik bojnog broda		Poručnik fregate		Poručnik korvete
Cyprus Navy
Cyprus Navy			Αντιναύαρχος; Antinavarchos	Υποναύαρχος; Yponavarchos	Αρχιπλοίαρχος; Archiploiarchos	Πλοίαρχος; Ploiarchos	Αντιπλοίαρχος; Antiploiarchos	Πλωτάρχης; Plotarchis		Υποπλοίαρχος; Ypoploiarchos		Ανθυποπλοίαρχος; Anthypoploiarchos		Σημαιοφόρος; Simaioforos
Czech Republic	No navy
Royal Danish Navy
Royal Danish Navy		Admiral	Viceadmiral	Kontreadmiral	Flotilleadmiral	Kommandør	Kommandørkaptajn	Orlogskaptajn		Kaptajnløjtnant		Premierløjtnant		Løjtnant
Estonian Navy
Estonian Navy		Admiral	Viitseadmiral	Kontradmiral	Kommodoor	Mereväekapten	Kaptenleitnant	Kaptenmajor		Vanemleitnant		Leitnant	Nooremleitnant	Lipnik
Finnish Navy
Finnish Navy		Amiraali	Vara-amiraali	Kontra-amiraali	Lippueamiraali	Kommodori	Komentaja	Komentajakapteeni		Kapteeniluutnantti		Yliluutnantti	Luutnantti	Aliluutnantti
Finnish Navy		Amiral	Viceamiral	Konteramiral	Flottiljamiral	Kommodor	Kommendör	Kommendörkapten		Kaptenlöjtnant		Premiärlöjtnant	Löjtnant	Underlöjtnant
Rank group	General / flag officers					Senior officers				Junior officers
French Navy
French Navy	Amiral de France	Amiral	Vice-amiral d'escadre	Vice-amiral	Contre-amiral	Capitaine de vaisseau	Capitaine de frégate	Capitaine de corvette		Lieutenant de vaisseau		Enseigne de vaisseau de 1^{re} classe		Enseigne de vaisseau de 2^{e} classe
German Navy
German Navy		Admiral	Vizeadmiral	Konteradmiral	Flottillenadmiral	Kapitän zur See	Fregattenkapitän	Korvettenkapitän		Stabskapitänleutnant	Kapitänleutnant	Oberleutnant zur See		Leutnant zur See
Hellenic Navy
Hellenic Navy		Ναύαρχος; Navarchos	Αντιναύαρχος; Antinavarchos	Υποναύαρχος; Yponavarchos	Αρχιπλοίαρχος; Archiploiarchos	Πλοίαρχος; Ploiarchos	Αντιπλοίαρχος; Antiploiarchos	Πλωτάρχης; Plotarchis		Υποπλοίαρχος; Ypoploiarchos		Ανθυποπλοίαρχος; Anthypoploiarchos		Σημαιοφόρος; Simaioforos
Hungarian River Guard
Hungarian River Guard						Ezredes	Alezredes	Őrnagy		Százados		Főhadnagy		Hadnagy
Irish Naval Service
Irish Naval Service			Vice admiral Leas-Aimiréal	Rear admiral Seach-Aimiréal	Commodore; Ceannasóir	Captain; Captaen	Commander; Ceannasaí	Lieutenant commander Lefteanant-Cheannasaí		Lieutenant; Lefteanant		Sub-lieutenant; Fo-Lefteanant		Ensign; Meirgire
Italian Navy
Italian Navy		Ammiraglio	Ammiraglio di squadra	Ammiraglio di divisione	Contrammiraglio	Capitano di vascello	Capitano di fregata	Capitano di corvetta		Tenente di vascello		Sottotenente di vascello		Guardiamarina
Latvian Naval Forces
Latvian Naval Forces			Viceadmirālis	Kontradmirālis	Flotiles admirālis	Jūras kapteinis	Komandkapteinis	Komandleitnants		Kapteiņleitnants		Virsleitnants		Leitnants
Lithuanian Naval Force
Lithuanian Naval Force		Admirolas	Viceadmirolas	Kontradmirolas	Flotilės admirolas	Jūrų kapitonas	Komandoras	Komandoras leitenantas		Kapitonas leitenantas		Vyresnysis leitenantas		Leitenantas
Luxembourg	No navy
Rank group	General / flag officers					Senior officers				Junior officers
Maritime Squadron of Malta
Maritime Squadron of Malta					Brigadier; Brigadier	Colonel; Kurunell	Lieutenant colonel Logutenent kurunell	Major; Maġġur		Captain; Kaptan		Lieutenant; Logutenent		Second lieutenant Sekond logutenent
Royal Netherlands Navy
Royal Netherlands Navy		Luitenant-Admiraal	Vice-Admiraal	Schout-bij-Nacht	Commandeur	Kapitein ter zee	Kapitein-luitenant ter zee	Luitenant ter zee der 1^{ste} klasse		Luitenant ter zee der 2^{de} klasse oudste categorie		Luitenant ter zee der 2^{de} klasse		Luitenant ter zee der 3^{de} klasse
Polish Navy
Polish Navy	Marszałek Polski	Admirał	Admirał floty	Wiceadmirał	Kontradmirał	Komandor	Komandor porucznik	Komandor podporucznik		Kapitan marynarki		Porucznik marynarki		Podporucznik marynarki
Portuguese Navy
Portuguese Navy	Almirante da Armada	Almirante	Vice-almirante	Contra-almirante	Comodoro	Capitão de mar e guerra	Capitão de fragata	Capitão-tenente		Primeiro-tenente		Segundo-tenente		Guarda-marinha/ Subtenente
Romanian Naval Forces
Romanian Naval Forces	Mareșal	Amiral	Viceamiral	Contraamiral	Contraamiral de flotilă	Comandor	Căpitan-comandor	Locotenent-comandor		Căpitan		Locotenent		Aspirant
Slovakia	No navy
Slovenia Navy
Slovenia Navy		Admiral	Vice admiral	Kontraadmiral	Kapitan	Kapitan bojne ladje	Kapitan fregate	Kapitan korvete		Poročnik bojne ladje		Poročnik fregate		Poročnik korvete
Spanish Navy
Spanish Navy	Capitán general	Almirante general	Almirante	Vicealmirante	Contralmirante	Capitán de navío	Capitán de fragata	Capitán de corbeta		Teniente de navío		Alférez de navío		Alférez de fragata
Spanish Marine Infantry
Spanish Marine Infantry			Teniente general	General de división	General de brigada	Coronel	Teniente coronel	Comandante		Capitán		Teniente		Alférez
Swedish Navy
Swedish Navy		Amiral	Viceamiral	Konteramiral	Flottiljamiral	Kommendör	Kommendörkapten	Örlogskapten		Kapten		Löjtnant		Fänrik
Rank group	General / flag officers					Senior officers				Junior officers

Remark:
NATO STANAG 2116 lists Officer Designates (listed here as OF[D]) of some countries alongside OF-1 ranks.

== See also ==
- Comparative navy enlisted ranks of the European Union
- Military rank
- Comparative army officer ranks of the European Union
- Comparative army enlisted ranks of the European Union
- Comparative air force officer ranks of the European Union
- Comparative air force enlisted ranks of the European Union
- Ranks and insignia of NATO navies' officers
- Comparative navy officer ranks of Europe
