= Staff captain =

Military rank

Staff captain is a rank of staff officer immediately above or below that of captain. It is used by various militaries around the world, typically in an administrative or assistant role to other officers.

== Historical use of the rank ==
=== Czechoslovakia ===
In the Czechoslovak Army, until 1953, staff captain (Czech: štábní kapitán, Slovak: štábny kapitán) was a senior captain rank, ranking between captain and major.

=== Estonia ===
The rank of staff captain (Estonian: staabikapten) was adopted from the Russian Imperial Army and used briefly by the Estonian military right before the German occupation of Estonia during World War I. During the occupation, it was replaced with the rank of captain.

=== Ireland ===
The rank of Staff Captain (Irish: captaen na foirne) was used by the Irish Republican Army during the Irish revolutionary period (1917–23). During The Troubles the rank was used by the Official IRA & Provisional IRA. Joe McCann was a staff captain in the Officials and killed unarmed by the British Army in 1972. John Francis Green was a staff captain in the Provisionals North Armagh Brigade & killed by the Ulster Volunteer Force in 1975 allegedly with the help of Royal Ulster Constabulary members from the infamous Glenanne gang.

=== Prussia ===
Staff captain (Stabskapitän, also: Stabshauptmann) is a historic military rank used in the Prussian army.

It ranked between the Premierleutnant (later called Oberleutnant) and Hauptmann/Rittmeister in the Prussian army. Its holder represented the actual captain and company commander in his absence, frequently and often for long periods, should his (usually noble) Hauptmann show no interest in leading the company, though the Hauptmann would retain his rank, status and uniform.

In the army of Frederick the Great, a regiment's Regimentschef, Oberst, staff officers, company commanders and those of nearby rank received a far higher rank than the staff captains who actually led the company. From this difference later developed the salary difference between a first class "Hauptleute first class" and "Hauptleute second class".

=== Russia ===
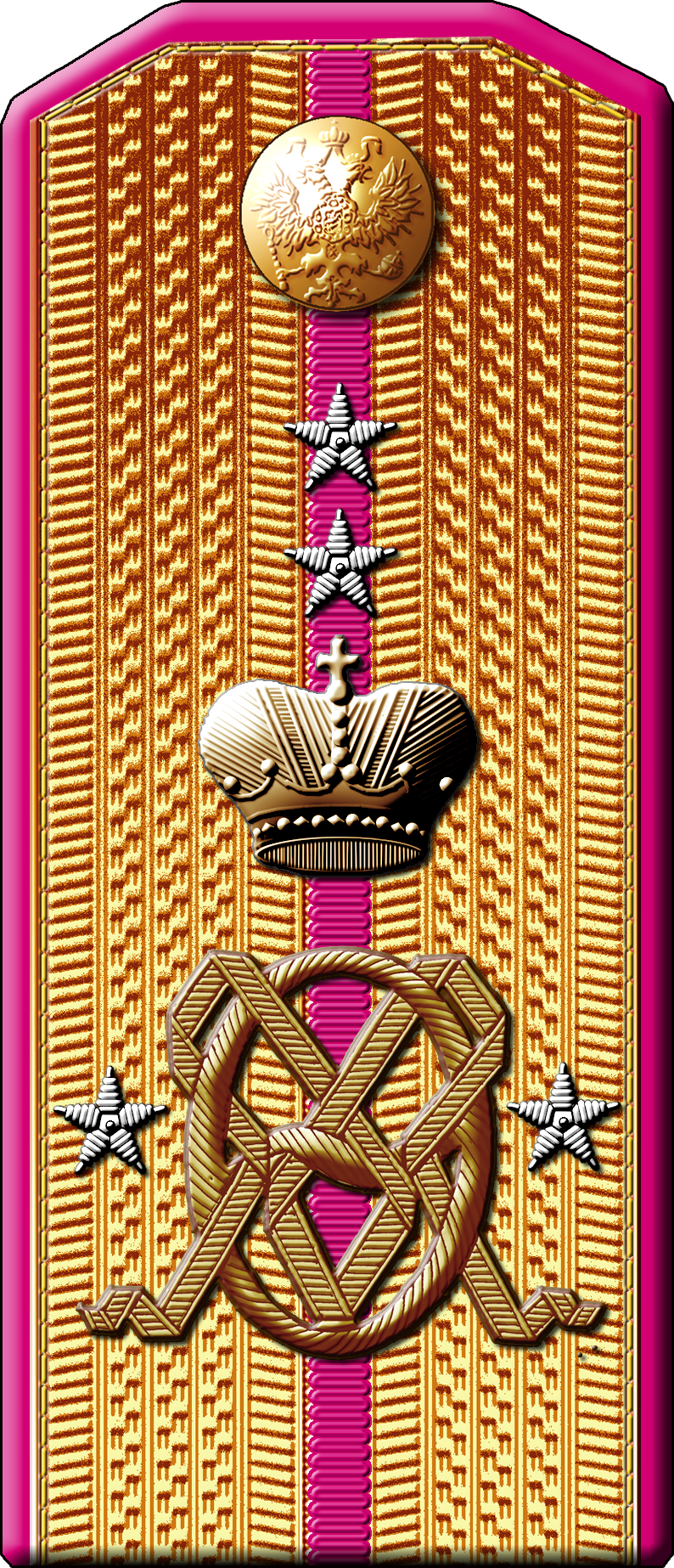
Stabs-kapitan RIA

In the Russian Imperial Army (RIA) the OF-2b rank of Stabs-kapitan (Russian: штабс-капитан) counted as a lieutenant captain ("light" captain) or senior lieutenant (ru: старший лейтенант; starshy leytenant) who ranked between poruchik (ru: пору́чик (OF-1a)) and captain (ru: капитан; kapitan (OF-2a)) and was in charge of a company-size military unit.

=== Sweden ===
Staff captain was a rank in the Swedish Army from 1750 until 1833, ranking above Lieutenant but under captain. A staff captain was the actual commander of one of the three companies in a foot regiment that had the field grade officers as formal commanding officers: the Colonel's Company, the Lieutenant Colonel's Company and the Major's Company. The corresponding rank before 1750 was kaptenlöjtnant.

=== United Kingdom ===
In the Royal Navy the master of the fleet was ranked as a staff captain after 1864, just below the captain, but he was not considered an executive branch officer and was not eligible for further promotion. Some exceptions were made to this rule, such as transfer to the executive officers list and promotion to captain of Sir Frederick Evans upon his retirement in 1872, in recognition of his hydrographic survey work and scientific merits.

Civilian fleets like the Cunard Line would employ the rank of staff captain to manage passengers in cases where the ship's captain was indisposed. The most notable of these was James Clarke Anderson, who was killed in the Sinking of the Lusitania under Captain William Thomas Turner.

== 21st century ==
=== Finland ===
A rank similar to Stabskapitän, yliluutnantti, is in use in Finnish military ranks.

=== Germany ===
Stabshauptmann (StHptm) meaning "Staff Captain", is the highest military rank in the Bundeswehr for limited duty officers (Offiziere des Militärfachlichen Dienstes (OffzMilFD)).

==== Bundeswehr ====
Staff captain is the top rank for officers of the MilFD-career. They have the same paygrade (A13) as majors. It is one of the rarest ranks in the German military. Those are former NCOs who have accomplished a special training programme through which they are given the opportunity to become officers. The navy equivalent is Stabskapitänleutnant (staff lieutenant captain (navy)).

Historically, a rank named "Stabshauptmann" (also: "Stabskapitän") existed in several German armies (such as Prussia) in the 18th century. However, while the modern Stabshauptman is a Senior Captain senior to a regular Hauptmann, the historical Stabshauptmann was a junior captain, ranking below Hauptmann rank. In 18th century armies companies often were "owned" by a nobleman, who formally was the company's captain, but did not actually command the unit. Instead, the owner of the company appointed an officer from the company his "Stabshauptmann", who technically served as the Hauptmann's mere staff assistant, but actually led the unit in his place.

The reversing in ranking of "Hauptmann" and "Stabshauptmann" in modern times is consequence of the practice in modern German military organisations (Reichswehr, Wehrmacht) to name the highest rank of a rank group beginning with the prefix "Stabs-", indicating that the holder serves in staff position to officers of the next higher rank group, e.g. during World War II, the highest NCO rank in the German army was Stabsfeldwebel, who served as direct assistant to company-grade officers or in staff function. However, this is no longer represented in the Bundeswehr's post-World War II rank structure since the creation of rank levels senior to the "Stabs-" level of ranks, denoted by the prefix "Oberstabs-" ("Senior Staff-", e.g. Oberstabsfeldwebel). There are no plans to create the rank of "Oberstabshauptmann".

German pay grade of Stabshauptmann is A13, same as of major (Hauptmann: A11/A12). According to NATO's STANAG 2116, the NATO rank code of Stabshauptmann is OF-2, same as for regular Hauptmann and therefore equal to captain rank in other NATO armies. To express the seniority of Stabshauptmann, "OF-2a" or other modifications of the official NATO rank code are in use unofficially.

== See also ==
- Captain lieutenant — naval rank of junior captain (naval), equal to the Commonwealth or United States rank of lieutenant (naval)
- Staff (military)
- History of Russian military ranks
- Captain (disambiguation)
