= John Burnes =

John Burnes may refer to:

- John Francis Burnes, officer in the United States Marine Corps
  - USS John Francis Burnes (DD-299)
- John David Burnes, Canadian archer

== See also ==
- John Burns (disambiguation)
