= Mustang (military officer) =

US Army term for an officer risen from the ranks

Mustang is a military slang term used in the United States Armed Forces to refer to a commissioned officer who began their career as an enlisted service member. A mustang officer is not a temporary or brevet promotion but is a commissioned officer who receives more pay according to their rank of O1-E, O2-E, etc., but has no more command responsibilities than those of any commissioned officer of the same grade.

Mustang officers are generally older than their peers-in-grade who have been commissioned from one of the service academies (such as the United States Merchant Marine Academy, United States Military Academy, United States Air Force Academy, United States Naval Academy, or United States Coast Guard Academy), Officer Candidate School, or the Reserve Officer Training Corps.

== History ==
The term "mustang" refers to the mustang horse, a feral animal and not a thoroughbred, which is captured and tamed.

The original definition of mustang was a military officer who had earned a battlefield commission; they were especially prevalent during World War II and the Korean War. Notable examples include Audie Murphy (World War II) and David Hackworth (Korean War). During the Vietnam War, some army warrant officer pilots were offered a direct commission to 2nd or 1st lieutenant, while usually being younger than 25 at the time of commission. Department of Defense military pay tables authorize approximately ten percent pay premiums for officers in grades O-1, O-2 and O-3 who have credit for over four years of enlisted or warrant officer service before commissioning (Grades O-1E, O-2E, O-3E).

A mustang is characterized by former enlisted service before transitioning to officer rank. As a slang term, there is no official U.S. Government definition or set of criteria to determine which officers can properly be called a mustang. By the end of World War II, it was understood across the armed forces that a mustang was an officer with service in the enlisted ranks before commissioning.

A similar term is Maverick used for the same reason.

== By branch ==
A United States Navy or United States Marine Corps mustang officer can be a warrant officer, a chief warrant officer, a limited duty officer, a staff corps officer, a restricted line officer or an unrestricted line officer, depending on the particular situation.

== Notable mustangs ==
=== American mustang officers ===
==== 19th century ====
- Samuel Chamberlain (1829–1908) – Dragoon sergeant of the Mexican War who re-enlisted in 1861 and eventually became a brevet general.
- Patrick Cleburne (1828–1864) – British army corporal who later became a Confederate general.
- Johnny Clem (1851–1937) – Enlisted in the US Civil War as a drummer boy in the Union Army and retired as a US Army general in 1917.
- Christian Fleetwood (1840–1915) – USCT sergeant and Medal of Honor recipient, later became a major in the District of Columbia National Guard.
- Nathan Bedford Forrest (1821–1877) – He began his career in the Confederate States Army as a private in the cavalry and was commissioned colonel in 1861, eventually becoming a lieutenant general.
- Mirabeau B. Lamar (1798–1859) – Enlisted as a private during the Texas Revolution and received a battlefield commission as a colonel and command of the Texian cavalry immediately before the Battle of San Jacinto. Lamar would later serve as the Texas Secretary of War and be elected president.
- William McKinley (1843–1901) – Enlisted as a private in the Union Army in 1861; promoted to the rank of sergeant. Received a battlefield commission for bravery under fire at the Battle of Antietam; mustered out of the army as a major. Subsequently, he became the 25th president of the United States.
- John Murphy (born c.1820, date of death unknown) – Irish sergeant who deserted the US army during the Mexican War and received a commission in the San Patricios Battalion of the Mexican Army.
- Galusha Pennypacker (1841/1844–1916). Initially a Union Army quartermaster sergeant in 1861. Promoted to major general in 1865.
- Winfield Scott (1786–1865) – Enlisted as a militia cavalry corporal in 1807 and commissioned as a captain in the Regular Army in 1808. He was promoted to brigadier general in 1814, aged 27, and eventually became a major general (and brevet lieutenant general).
- Frederick Winthrop (1839-1865) – Enlisted in the army as a private in April 1861 and appointed captain in October 1861, later brevetted to brigadier general in 1864. He fought in most of the US Civil War's major battles, and was killed at the Battle of Five Forks about a week before General Robert E. Lee's surrender at Appomattox. He was brevetted major general for that battle.

==== 20th and 21st centuries ====
- Ellis E. Austin – Joined the U.S. Navy in 1941 as an aviation electronics technician. Promoted to chief warrant officer 1956 (mustang) and advanced to commander as a bombardier/navigator on the A6-A Intruder (Attack Squadron VA-42) flying off the Kitty Hawk in 1966. Shot down over North Vietnam on April 21, 1966. Still Missing in Action. Awarded the Purple Heart in 1966, The Distinguished Flying Cross, The Bronze Star, and Navy Commendation Medal with "V" for heroic achievement. He joined the Caterpillar Club when he was ejected from his disabled AJ Savage aircraft in 1956.
- John F. Aiso (1909–1987) – Already a practicing lawyer, he was drafted in the Army in 1941 and assigned to menial jobs. Recruited by Army Intelligence to teach Japanese, but due to a prohibition of Japanese Americans being commissioned, was discharged and hired as a War Department Civilian at the Military Intelligence Service Language School. It took the intervention of Gen Clayton Bissell to demand a direct commission for Aiso to major, the highest-ranking Japanese-American during the war.
- Jeremy Boorda (1939–1996) – Rose from the USN enlisted ranks to become a four-star admiral and Chief of Naval Operations. He committed suicide in 1996 while serving as CNO.
- Ernest C. Brace (1931–2014) – Enlisted in the United States Marine Corps as a radio/radar technician in 1947, earned a commission as a Marine pilot, and flew more than 100 missions during the Korean War before being court-martialed.
- Gregory R. Bryant (Born 1950) – Enlisted in the United States Navy in 1970 and was eventually promoted to rear admiral. He became deputy chief of staff for fleet maintenance, U.S. Pacific Fleet. In 2005, Gregory retired.
- John Francis Burnes (birth name: Martin Maher) (1883–1918) – Enlisted in the United States Marine Corps in 1904, achieved the rank of sergeant major by 1916, was promoted to captain (temporary service) on 3 June 1917, was wounded in WWI during the Battle of Belleau Wood, and died soon after. Awarded the Distinguished Service Cross, the Navy Cross, and the Silver Star citation. The destroyer USS John Francis Burnes (DD-299) was named for him.
- Dale Dye (born 1944) – Retired USMC captain. Awarded Bronze Star and three Purple Hearts during the Vietnam War.
- John William Finn (1909–2010) – Enlisted in the Navy in July 1926, shortly before his seventeenth birthday. Promoted to chief petty officer in 1935. Awarded the Medal of Honor for his actions at Naval Air Station Kaneohe Bay during the attack on Pearl Harbor. In 1942, Finn was commissioned and served as a limited-duty officer with the rank of ensign. In 1947 he reverted to his enlisted rank of chief petty officer, eventually becoming a lieutenant with Bombing Squadron VB-102 aboard the USS Hancock (CV-19). Retired from the Navy as a lieutenant in September 1956.
- Robin Fontes – Enlisted in the United States Army Reserve in 1981, earned a commission from West Point in 1986, and was promoted to major general in 2017.
- John W. Foss (born 1933) – Enlisted in Minnesota National Guard at 16 and then Regular Army upon graduation from high school. Served as an infantry private. Accepted to United States Military Academy Preparatory School and then United States Military Academy, graduating in 1956. Served two combat tours in the Vietnam War and eventually became commanding general United States Army Training and Doctrine Command. Retired as a four-star general in 1991.
- Wesley L. Fox (1931–2017) – Retired USMC colonel who rose from the ranks of private to first sergeant to colonel. Awarded Medal of Honor, Bronze Star (with Combat V), and four Purple Hearts during the Vietnam War.
- Tommy Franks (born 1945) – Enlisted in 1965 as a cryptologic analyst, selected to attend the Artillery and Missile Officer Candidate School, and was commissioned a second lieutenant in 1967, later rising to four-star general. Franks was the U.S. general leading the attack on the Taliban in Afghanistan in response to the September 11 attacks on the World Trade Center and The Pentagon in 2001.
- Harry K. Fukuhara (1920–2015) – Sent to a internment camp at the outbreak of WWII. Enlisted with the Military Intelligence Service in the Pacific, earning a battlefield commission for his bravery. Inducted into the Military Intelligence Hall of Fame and honored by the naming of the 500th Military Intelligence Brigade HQ at Schofield Barracks as "Fukuhara Hall."
- Tulsi Gabbard (born 1981) – Enlisted as a medical specialist with the 29th Infantry Brigade Support Battalion of the Hawaii Army National Guard; rose to the rank of major. Eventually rose to the rank of lieutenant colonel in a California unit of the U.S. Army Reserves, before going to on serve as a member of Congress representing Hawaii's 2nd congressional district in the United States House of Representatives. Eventually was appointed as the eighth Director of National Intelligence (DNI) under the second Trump administration.
- Jim Gant (born c.1965) – US Army sergeant during the First Gulf War and captain during the American Afghan War.
- Randy George (born 1964) – Enlisted in the Army in 1982, attended United States Military Academy and commissioned an infantry officer in 1988. Deployed with the 101st Airborne Division during Operation Desert Storm. Deployed to Operation Enduring Freedom as commanding officer, 4th Brigade Combat Team, 4th Infantry Division. Later posted to positions in the Joint Chiefs of Staff and appointed Army Chief of Staff in 2023 before being forced into retirement in 2026 by Secretary of Defense Pete Hegseth.
- Alfred M. Gray, Jr. (1928-2024) – Served as an enlisted Marine sergeant before becoming a mustang. Retired as a United States Marine Corps general who served as the 29th commandant of the Marine Corps, from 1987 to 1991.
- David Hackworth (1930–2005) – Korean War and Vietnam War veteran. Retired in 1971 with the rank of colonel.
- Courtney Hodges (1887–1966) – Enlisted as a private in the US Army in 1906; was commissioned and served in both World War I and World War II, during the latter of which he commanded First US Army; retired in 1949 as a general.
- Daniel Inouye (1924–2012) – Enlisted in the segregated Japanese-American 442nd RCT in WWII, earning a battlefield commission for his bravery. Elected to the US Senate in 1962, he served for almost 50 years. Countless military assets and installations have since been named in his honor. After reviewing military records in the 1990s, Inouye was decorated with the Medal of Honor for his actions in the Italian Campaign.
- Young-Oak Kim (1919–2005) – Drafted into the Army in 1941, served a year as an enlisted engineer before being selected for Infantry Officer Candidate School. Served as a staff officer with the 442nd RCT in WWII. He became the first minority officer to command an Army battalion in combat in Korea and to serve as an instructor at the Army Command and General Staff College.
- Jonny Kim (born 1984) – Enlisted with the United States Navy in 2002 as a seaman recruit; graduated BUD/S class 247 and was assigned to SEAL Team 3 with the rating of Special Warfare Operator. Kim was accepted for commissioning in 2009; when he graduated from the University of San Diego in 2012 and left the Naval Reserve Officers Training Corps, Kim entered the Medical Corps. Jonny Kim then received a Doctor of Medicine from Harvard Medical School.
- George E. R. Kinnear II (1928–2015) – Enlisted as a Seaman Recruit in the US Navy in 1945, was commissioned as an ensign in 1948, served as a Naval Aviator in Korea and Vietnam and as commander of NAS Miramar ("Top Gun"), and retired as a four-star admiral in 1982.
- Carwood Lipton (1920–2001) – World War II veteran who was a member of Easy Company, 2nd Battalion, 506th Parachute Infantry Regiment, 101st Airborne Division. He enlisted as a private and eventually received a battlefield commission to second lieutenant. His story was featured in the Band of Brothers and was portrayed in the miniseries adaptation by Donnie Wahlberg.
- James Mattis (born 1950) – Retired USMC general, a former Secretary of Defense. Enlisted in the USMC in 1969 and was commissioned a second lieutenant through Naval ROTC on January 1, 1972.
- Audie Murphy (1925–1971) – The most decorated US soldier of World War II, Staff Sergeant Murphy received a battlefield commission in France in 1944; subsequently became an actor. Received the Medal of Honor and later held a major's commission in the US National Guard.
- Peter J. Ortiz (1913–1988) – Enlisted in the French Foreign Legion, receiving a field commission. Enlisted and later commissioned a second lieutenant in the United States Marine Corps in 1942. Retired as a colonel in the USMCR.
- Lewis Burwell "Chesty" Puller (1898–1971) – Enlisted in the Marine Corps in 1918 and received a commission in 1924. Retired as a lieutenant general. He was awarded the Navy Cross five times, the second person in history to be awarded as many.
- John Shalikashvili (1936–2011) – Drafted into the Army in 1958; was accepted to Officer Candidate School the following year. He went on to become a four-star general and Chairman of the Joint Chiefs of Staff (1993–1997), retiring in 1997.
- Clarence A. Shoop (1907–1968) – Enlisted in the Pennsylvania Army National Guard in 1927, earned a commission in the Army Air Corps as a pilot, and retired from the United States Air Force as a major general.
- Larry O. Spencer (born 1954) – Enlisted in the United States Air Force in 1971, subsequently earned a commission as a second lieutenant in 1980 through the Officer Training School and later became the 37th Vice Chief of Staff of the United States Air Force. Retired as a four-star general in 2015.
- James Stewart (1908–1997) – Enlisted in the US Army in 1941 as a private, subsequently commissioned as a second lieutenant in 1942 due to his prior experience as a civilian pilot and by having a college degree. Flew B-24 Liberators, and by the end of World War II was a colonel, commanding the 2nd Bombardment Wing. Retired from the USAF Reserves in 1967 as a brigadier general, with his last combat flight in a B-52 Stratofortress over Vietnam in 1967.
- Jeff Struecker (born 1969) – Retired US Army major. He served as an enlisted man in Panama and Somalia before attending and graduating from seminary and being commissioned as a pastor in the army. Portrayed by Brian Van Holt in the film Black Hawk Down (2001).
- John William Vessey, Jr. (1922–2016) – Enlisted in the Minnesota National Guard in 1939 at the age of 16; received a battlefield commission at the WWII battle of Anzio and fought in the Korean and Vietnam wars, rising to a four-star general in 1976 and Chairman of the Joint Chiefs of Staff in 1982.
- Larry D. Welch (born 1934) – Enlisted in the Kansas National Guard in 1951; later enlisted in the USAF and rose to become Chief of Staff of the United States Air Force. Retired as a four-star general in 1990.
- Chuck Yeager (1923–2020) – Enlisted in the U.S. Army Air Forces in 1941 and began as an aircraft mechanic. He soon entered pilot training and served as a flight officer upon receiving his wings. He later earned a commission as a second lieutenant. He was a noted combat pilot during World War II and a test pilot during the postwar era, including being the first to successfully exceed the speed of sound. Retired from the U.S. Air Force as a brigadier general in 1975.
- Richard J. Tallman (born 1925-1972) – Enlisted in 1943 as a private first class in the 42nd Infantry Division. After the Battle of the Bulge, was field commissioned to 2nd lieutenant. After the war, he went to West Point and became a 1st lieutenant. He was a company commander in the Korean War and was on his third tour in Vietnam when he was killed in 1972 during the Battle of An Loc as a brigadier general.

=== Non-American mustang officers ===
==== British Empire ====
- Idi Amin – British Army cook during the 1940s, later one of the first native commissioned officers in the Ugandan army.
- Adrian Carton de Wiart – Joined British cavalry as an enlisted man during the Second Boer War. Commissioned as a lieutenant in 1901 and later served as a general during World War I and II.
- John Crocker – Enlisted as a private soldier in the British Army in 1915; made temporary second lieutenant in the Machine Gun Corps on 26 January 1917; left army, but rejoined the Middlesex Regiment 1920. Rose to general in WWII.
- George Croil – Joined the Gordon Highlanders as a private in 1914. Air Marshal with the Canadian Air Force during World War II.
- Moshe Dayan – Enlisted in the British Army during World War II; then served as an Israeli general in all three of the Arab Israeli Wars.
- Henry Kelly VC – Promoted from sergeant major to lieutenant in 1915, later fought in the Irish Civil War and Spanish Civil War.
- Enoch Powell – Joined the British Army in 1939 as a private in the Royal Warwickshire Regiment, ended the war as a brigadier.
- John Quilliam was conscripted into the Royal Navy in 1794, promoted to midshipman in 1797, and retired in 1817 with the rank of captain.
- Arnold Ridley – best known for playing Private Godfrey in Dad's Army, rose from private to captain during World War I and also served with the British Army and Home Guard during World War II.
- William "Wully" Robertson – Chief of the Imperial General Staff (CIGS – the professional head of the British Army) during the First World War. The first, and to date only, British soldier to rise from private to field marshal.
- Jan Smuts – a South African World War I and World War II general, began his military career as a corporal in a commando before the Boer War.
- Israel Tal – enlisted in the British army during World War II and served as an Israeli general in the Six Day War and Yom Kippur War.
- Charles Upham – NZEF soldier that started World War II as a private, rose to the rank of captain, and went on to become the only combat soldier awarded a bar to their Victoria Cross.

==== France ====
- Pierre Augereau – Served as an enlisted man in numerous European armies, including the French, before the French Revolution; became a Marshal of the Empire under Napoleon.
- François Achille Bazaine – Enlisted in 1831, became a Foreign Legion officer several yars later, Marshal of France in 1864; served as commander-in-chief of the French Army during the Franco-Prussian War.
- Jean-Baptiste Jules Bernadotte (aka King Charles XIV John) – Served in the Régiment Royal–La Marine for a decade; became a Marshal of the Empire under Napoleon, and later was elected Crown Prince of Sweden, he died as the King of Sweden and King of Norway.
- Jean-Baptiste Bessières – Enlisted in the Constitutional Guard and served in the army during the French Revolutionary Wars; became a Marshal of the Empire under Napoleon.
- Marcel Bigeard – Enlisted in 1936, became a sergeant in 1940, participated in World War II, the First Indochina War, and the Algerian War; ended his career as a lieutenant general.
- Ferdinand Foch – Enlisted during the Franco-Prussian War; became a Marshal of France and Supreme Allied Commander during World War I.
- Jean-Baptiste Jourdan – Enlisted in the French Army when he was 15 years old and fought in the American War of Independence; became a Marshal of the Empire under Napoleon.
- Jean Lannes – Served as sergeant-major of a volunteer battalion during the French Revolutionary Wars; became a Marshal of the Empire under Napoleon.
- Jacques MacDonald – Served as an enlisted man in the Irish Legion and in Dutch service before receiving a commission in the French Army; became a Marshal of the Empire under Napoleon.
- André Masséna – Served as an enlisted soldier in the Royal Italian Regiment of the French Army for 14 years; became a Marshal of the Empire under Napoleon.
- Bon-Adrien Jeannot de Moncey – Enlisted twice as a youth but was quickly dismissed when his father intervened; became a Marshal of the Empire under Napoleon.
- Michel Ney – Served 5 years as an enlisted cavalryman; became a Marshal of the Empire under Napoleon.
- Nicolas Oudinot – Served 3 years as an enlisted soldier; became a Marshal of the Empire under Napoleon.
- Laurent de Gouvion Saint-Cyr – Briefly served as an enlisted soldier before being elected as an officer in a volunteer unit during the French Revolutionary Wars; became a Marshal of the Empire under Napoleon.
- Nicholas Savin – Cavalry NCO during the French Revolutionary Wars, promoted to lieutenant under Napoleon. Died in 1894 at the claimed age of 126.
- Jean-de-Dieu Soult – Enlisted in the French Army as a teenager and served for several years before receiving a commission; became a Marshal of the Empire under Napoleon.
- Louis-Gabriel Suchet – Served as cavalryman in the National Guard before receiving a commission; became a Marshal of the Empire under Napoleon.
- Claude Victor-Perrin, Duc de Belluno – Had already retired after ten years of enlisted service; became a Marshal of the Empire under Napoleon.

==== Russia ====
- Pavel Ivanovich Batov – Russian Imperial Guard during World War I, Red Army commander during the Russian Civil War, Spanish Civil War, Winter War, and Great Patriotic War.
- Ivan Bogdanov – NCO in the Tsarist Army and Red Army commander during the Russian Civil War and Great Patriotic War. Killed in action in 1942.
- Semyon Budyonny – NCO in the Tsarist army, decorated multiple times during World War I, commander of the 1st Cavalry Army of the Red Army in the Civil War, Marshal of the Soviet Union from 1935 to his death in 1973.
- Vasily Chapaev – NCO in the Tsarist army and three times decorated with the Order of St. George in World War I, joined the Bolsheviks in 1917 to become one of the first "Red Commanders". Noted for his bravery, he was killed in action, drowning in the Ural River, in 1919 and has been since immortalized as a hero in both the Soviet Union and Russian Federation.
- Pavel Dybenko – Promoted to naval NCO in the Baltic Fleet in 1912. He participated in the October Revolution in Petrograd, fought in the Civil War, and reached the rank of Army General and military district commander in the Red Army. He was executed in 1938, during Stalin's Great Purge.
- Vasily Gordov – Junior sergeant in 1915–17. He commanded the Stalingrad Front in 1942 during the early stages of the Battle of Stalingrad. Took part in the Battle of Berlin and the Prague Offensive in 1945.
- Andrei Grechko – Enlisted as a cavalryman in the Red Army during the Russian Civil War, rose from divisional to army commander during the Great Patriotic War, promoted to Marshal of the Soviet Union in 1955, and served as Minister of Defense of the Soviet Union during the Brezhnev era until he died in 1976.
- Grigory Kulik – Promoted to senior feuerwerker (artillery NCO) in 1915 and was decorated many times for bravery in World War I; joined the Red Army after the Revolution and became a Marshal of the Soviet Union in 1940, taking part in the Great Patriotic War.
- Mikhail Lashevich – Senior NCO in the Tsarist Army, was wounded twice in World War I. In the Civil War, he held command positions in various Red armies, then went to Harbin to serve as deputy chairman of the Chinese Eastern Railway (1926–1928).
- Rodion Malinovsky – Corporal of the Russian Expeditionary Force in France during World War I, a Red Army drill instructor during the Russian Civil War, and a republican staff officer during the Spanish Civil War. Rose from major-general to Marshal of the Soviet Union during the course of the Great Patriotic War, finally serving as Minister of Defense of the Soviet Union from 1957 until he died in 1967.
- Lev Mekhlis – Bombardier in the 2nd Grenadier Artillery Regiment (1911), feuerwerker (senior artillery NCO) in 1917; joined the Red Army in 1918, Colonel-General from 1939, member of the Stavka and head of the Main Political Directorate of the Red Army during the Great Patriotic War.
- Romuald Muklevich – Petty officer in the Baltic Fleet from 1912, took part in the Storming of the Winter Palace in October 1917, rose to become an admiral and the commander-in-chief of the Soviet Navy 1926–31, commissar for shipbuilding industry 1934–36, deputy minister for the defense industries 1936–37. He was killed in 1938, during Stalin's purge.
- Konstantin Rokossovsky – Tsarist cavalry NCO until 1917, then served in the Red Army until arrested and imprisoned during Stalin's purge. Reinstated as a major general in the Red Army in 1940, he rose to Marshal of the Soviet Union in 1944 during the Great Patriotic War. Transferred to the Polish People's Army as a Marshal of Poland and Minister of National Defense after the war in 1949, dismissed by Władysław Gomułka and sent back to the Soviet Union in October 1956, finally retiring in 1962.
- Prokofy Romanenko – was promoted from sergeant to praporshchik before the October Revolution, and later joined the Red Army.
- Andrey Yeryomenko – In 1914, he took part in the capture of Przemysl and was promoted to NCO. Joining the Bolsheviks in the Civil War, he was a proponent of mechanized warfare and earned the nickname "Russian Guderian". In 1941–45 he commanded many fronts, including the Stalingrad Front, during the main phase of the Battle of Stalingrad. In 1955, he was promoted to Marshal of the Soviet Union.
- Matvei Zakharov – Volunteered in the Bolshevik Red Guards and participated in the storming of the Winter Palace during the October Revolution, commanded an artillery battery in the Red Army during the Russian Civil War, rose from army-level to front-level staff officer during the Great Patriotic War, promoted to Marshal of the Soviet Union in 1955 and served as Chief of the General Staff of the Soviet Armed Forces and principal of the K.E. Voroshilov General Staff Academy from 1960 to 1971.
- Andrei Zhdanov – NCO in the 139th Infantry Regiment (1916–1917), member of the Central Committee of the CPSU and Stalin's inner circle in the 1930s, Colonel-General of the Red Army and head of the defense of Leningrad in the Great Patriotic War.
- Dmitry Zhloba – Studied to be a military engineer and became a Tsarist NCO in 1917. Joined the Bolsheviks in Moscow and took part in storming the Kremlin. In 1918, he led the famous "Steel Division" of 15,000 men on a legendary 800-kilometer march in sixteen days from Nevinnomysskaya to Tsaritsyn, falling on the rear of Pyotr Krasnov's besieging White Army to relieve the Bolshevik garrison during the Battle of Tsaritsyn.
- Georgy Zhukov – NCO in the Tsarist army in World War, Order of St. George, Marshal of the Soviet Union from 1941, and Defence Minister during and after the Great Patriotic War.

==== Germany ====
- Franz Bake – a lance corporal during the First World War. Became a panzer ace and rose to the rank of Generalmajor during World War II.
- Oskar Dirlewanger – an infamous war criminal, rapist, and pedophile, was an enlisted machine gunner during World War I and a colonel with the Waffen SS during World War II.
- Sepp Dietrich – a sergeant during World War I and a general in the SS during World War II.
- Hugo Gutmann – Adolf Hitler's commanding officer during World War I, was promoted from feldwebel to lieutenant in 1915.
- Adolf Heusinger – enlisted in 1914, was promoted to lieutenant in 1917, and later became a general in the Nazi Wehrmacht and West German Bundeswehr.
- Ernst Jünger – promoted from private to lieutenant during World War I and became a Wehrmacht captain during World War II.
- Erich Kastner – the last German World War I veteran, enlisted as a private in 1918 and was promoted to major during World War II.
- Hermann-Bernhard Ramcke - began his career as a ship's boy in the Imperial German Navy, served as Naval Infantry NCO in World War I before being commissioned in 1918, became a General der Fallschirmtruppe during World War II.
- Günther Rall – began his career as a sergeant in the Nazi Luftwaffe, and became a general in the West German Air Force after the war.
- Hans Sommer – promoted from staff sergeant to lieutenant in the Waffen SS, and after the war, became a Stasi officer.
- Willi Stoph – an unteroffizier in the Wehrmacht, and a general in the East German Army.

==== Poland ====
- Menachem Begin – a corporal in Wladyslaw Anders' Free Polish Army during World War II, and an Irgun commander during the 1947–1949 Palestine war.
- David Ben-Gurion – joined the British Jewish Legion during World War I, and led the Israeli Defence Force during the 1948 Arab-Israeli War.
- Wladyslaw Bortnowski – an NCO in the Polish legion during World War I, and a Polish Army general during the September Campaign.
- Yitzhak Sadeh – enlisted in the Tsarist army during World War I and was an Israeli general during the First Arab-Israeli War.
- Karol Świerczewski – enlisted in the Soviet Red Army as rank-and-file soldier fighting in the Russian Civil War, served as a brigadier in the International Brigades under the nom de guerre General Walter during the Spanish Civil War, returned to the Soviet Union as a major-general in 1940, and was finally promoted to general of the department in 1943 with his transfer to the Polish People's Army during World War II.
- Samuel Willenberg – enlisted in the Polish army at the age of 16, became a sergeant in the Resistance and was promoted to lieutenant in the Polish People's Army after the war.

==== Netherlands ====
- Wiebbe Hayes – promoted from sergeant to lieutenant for defeating the Batavia mutiny.

== See also ==
- Seaman to Admiral - 21, US Navy commissioning program
