= Captain-commandant =

Rank currently used in the Belgian Armed Forces

Captain-commandant is a rank currently used in the Belgian Armed Forces and formerly used in the United States Revenue Cutter Service and its successor, the United States Coast Guard.

== Belgium ==
Captain-commandant: Kapitein-commandant (Flemish); Capitaine-commandant (French)
- Army, air force and medical insignia
- Country: Belgium
- Service branch: Belgian Land Component; Belgian Air Component; Belgian Medical Component
- Rank group: Junior officer
- NATO rank code: OF-3
- Next higher rank: Major
- Next lower rank: Captain
- Equivalent ranks: Corvette captain

Captain-commandant (Flemish: Kapitein-commandant; French: Capitaine-commandant; German: Stabshauptmann) is a junior officer of commissioned officer rank in the air component, land component, the old Belgian Gendarmerie and medical component of the Belgian Armed Forces. A Captain-commandant ranks directly above a captain and immediately under a major. Officers of this rank usually serve in staff functions or more rarely as commanders of small units such as squadrons and companies. The insignia are three pips under a narrow stripe for the land component, three blue stripes with navy curl for the air component and three gold stripes with navy curl for the medical component. In the naval component, the rank is called luitenant ter zee eerste klasse or Lieutenant de vaisseau de première classe ("ship-of-the-line lieutenant first class"), and the insignia is two and a half gold stripes with a naval curl.

== U.S. Revenue Cutter Service and U.S. Coast Guard ==
In the United States between the years 1908 and 1923 the rank of captain-commandant was used by the United States Revenue Cutter Service and the United States Coast Guard for its most senior ranking officer. Since 1923 this title has been Commandant of the Coast Guard.

== See also ==
- Senior captain
- Staff captain
