= Captain Lieutenant (disambiguation) =

The term Captain Lieutenant may refer to:

- Captain Lieutenant (Russian Navy), a rank in the Russian Navy, Red Fleet/Soviet Navy and previously Imperial Russian Navy
- Captain-lieutenant, a former rank in the British army
- Kapitänleutnant, a rank in the German Navy
