= Stabskapitän =

Military rank

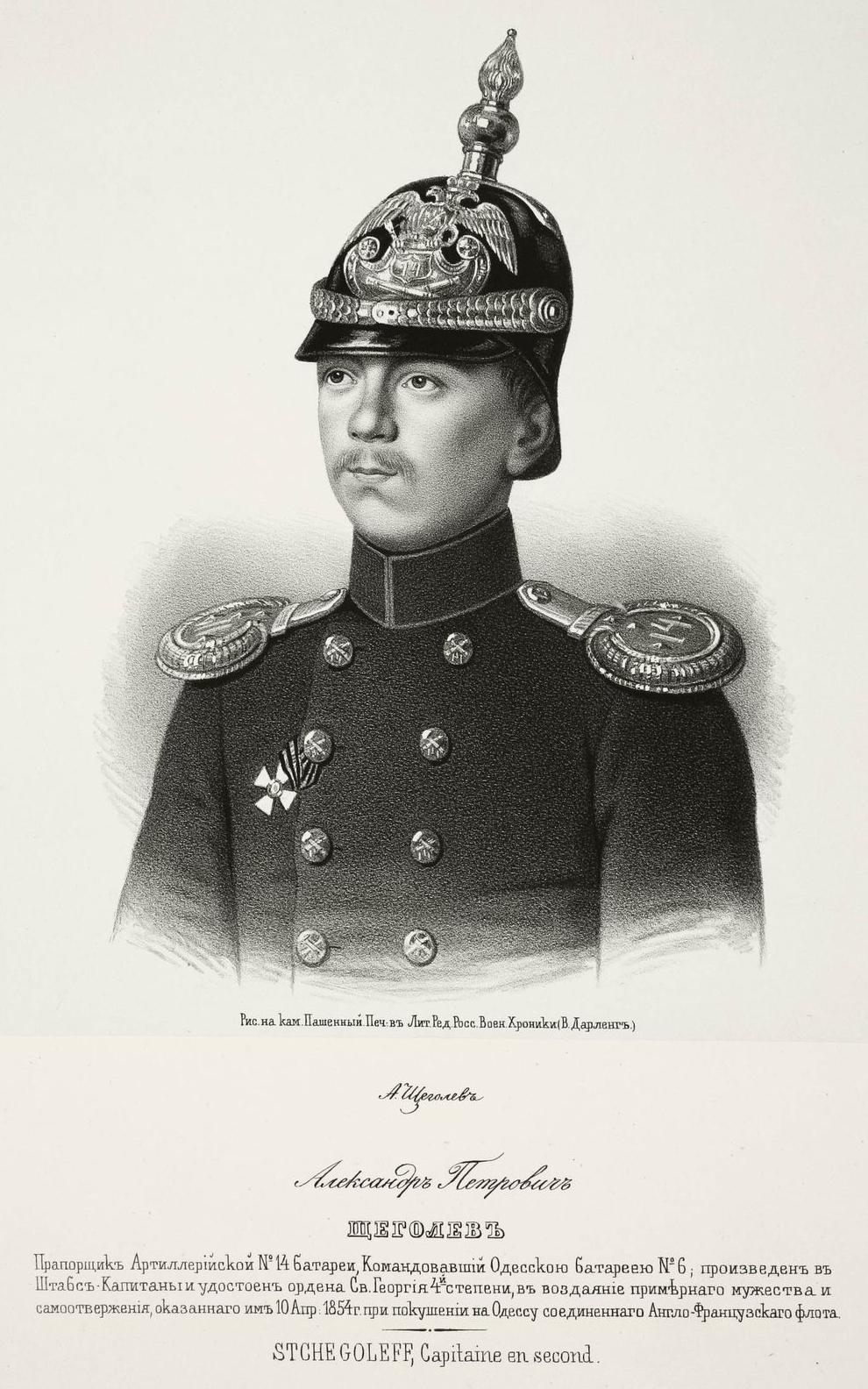
Staff captain, Russian artillery, wearing a Pickelhaube, about 1858

Stabskapitän (English: staff captain), in the cavalry also Stabsrittmeister ("staff riding master" or "staff cavalry master"), or Kapitänleutnant (captain lieutenant), was a historic military rank in the Prussian Army. In reference to the German Stabskapitän the equivalent rank in the Imperial Russian Army used to be the rank shtabs-kapitan (Russian: штабс-капитан).

It ranked between the Premierleutnant (later called Oberleutnant) and Hauptmann/Rittmeister in the Prussian army, and between poruchik and captain in the Russian army. Its holder represented the actual captain and company commander in his absence, frequently and often for long periods, should his (usually noble) Hauptmann show no interest in leading the company, though the Hauptmann would retain his rank, status and uniform.

In the army of Frederick the Great, a regiment's regimentschef, oberst, staff officers, company commanders and those of nearby rank received a far higher rank than the staff captains who actually led the company. From this difference later developed the salary difference between a first class "Hauptleute first class" and "Hauptleute second class".

== Finland ==
A similar rank, was stabskapten (Swedish), or alikapteeni (Finnish) in the Military of the Grand Duchy of Finland, using the Russian rank system (see below). Currently the corresponding rank in the Finnish Army is yliluutnantti.

== Russian Empire ==
Shtabs-kapitan (Russian: штабс-капитан) was in the Russian Imperial Army (RIA) until 1917 a light captain rank (NATO-equivalent OF-2b) who was in charge of a company-size military unit.

Sequence of military ranks
junior rank: Poruchik	Shtabs-kapitan (cavalry: Shtabs-rotmistr)	senior rank: Kapitan (en: Captain)
junior rank: Starshy leytenant (en: 1st lieutenant)	Shtabs-kapitan (cavalry: Shtabs-rotmistr)	senior rank: Kapitan (en: Captain)

== See also ==
- Stabshauptmann — modern German Bundeswehr rank senior to regular Captain rank
- Captain lieutenant — naval rank junior Captain (naval), equal to the Commonwealth or US rank of Lieutenant (naval)
