= Stabshauptmann =

Germanic military rank

Stabshauptmann (transl. staff captain) is a German language variant of senior captain.

== History ==
Historically, a rank named "Stabshauptmann" (also: "Stabskapitän") existed in several German armies in the 18th century. However, while the modern Stabshauptman is a Senior Captain senior to a regular Hauptmann, the historical Stabshauptmann was a Junior captain, ranking below Hauptmann rank. In 18th century armies companies often were "owned" by a noble man, who formally was the company's captain, but did not actually command the unit. Instead, the owner of the company appointed an officer from the company his "Stabshauptmann", who technically served as the Hauptmann's mere staff assistant, but actually led the unit in his place.

The reversing in ranking of "Hauptmann" and "Stabshauptmann" in modern times is consequence of the practice in modern German military organisations (Reichswehr, Wehrmacht) to name the highest rank of a rank group beginning with the prefix "Stabs-", indicating that the holder serves in staff position to officers of the next higher rank group, e.g. during World War II, the highest NCO rank in the German army was Stabsfeldwebel, who served as direct assistant to company-grade officers or in staff function. However, this is no longer represented in the Bundeswehr's post-World War II rank structure since the creation of rank levels senior to the "Stabs-" level of ranks, denoted by the prefix "Oberstabs-" ("Senior Staff-", e.g. Oberstabsfeldwebel). There are no plans to create the rank of "Oberstabshauptmann".

== Belgium ==
The rank of Stabshauptmann (Flemish: Kapitein-commandant) is used by the Belgian Land, Air and Medical Components. It is rank just below Major, but still ranked OF-3 with the NATO rank structure.

== Germany ==
Stabshauptmann
- Army and Air Force insignia
- Country: Germany
- Service branch: German Army; German Air Force
- Abbreviation: StHptm
- NATO rank code: OF-2
- Pay grade: A13
- Formation: 1993
- Next higher rank: Major
- Next lower rank: Hauptmann
- Equivalent ranks: Stabskapitänleutnant

Stabshauptmann is the highest military rank in the Bundeswehr for specialist officers (German: Offiziere des Militärfachlichen Dienstes (OffzMilFD)).

Instead of being promoted to the rank of major, specialist officers that were holding the rank of Hauptmann (Captain) for a specific time are promoted to the rank of Stabshauptmann and given the salary of a Major. Sometimes regular officers are promoted to a post that is intended for a Stabshauptmann if there is no free post for a Major.

The badge of rank is four silver stars. It is one of the rarest ranks in the German military. One notable case in which the rank is conferred has been the "MilFD officers". These are former NCOs who have completed a training programme in order to be raised from the ranks, to specialist-officer roles. The duties of such officers are therefore specialised similar to those of Warrant officer grades in the United States Army .

=== Rank insignia ===
On the shoulder straps (Heer, Luftwaffe) there are four silver pips (stars).

Heer	Luftwaffe
Stabshauptmann (Logistics troops) Stabshauptmann (Mechanized infantry) StHptm d.R. (Mech. infantry res.)	Stabshauptmann (field suit) Stabshauptmann (flecktarn)

junior Rank; Oberleutnant	(German officer rank); Stabshauptmann	senior Rank; Major
junior Rank; Oberleutnant	Hauptmann	senior Rank; Major

There is no corresponding rank for officers in Bundeswehr Joint Medical Service.

== See also ==
- Senior captain
- Limited duty officer
