= Danielle Levillez =

Major General Danielle Levillez (born Brussels, June 1956) is a former officer in the Belgian Armed Forces and the first woman to become a general officer in the Belgian military.

== Life ==
Levillez's trained as a pharmacist, graduating from the Université libre de Bruxelles with a minor in industrial chemistry from the University of Louvain. Levillez joined the military in 1979. She first worked in the central military pharmacy in Nivelles. Levillez was appointed the first female colonel in the Belgian military (2002), and was the first to achieve general rank – initially as a brigadier in December 2005. From December 2005 to 21 July 2009, she was Chief of Staff of the Belgian Medical Component. In 2012, Levillez was promoted to Major General. For many years, Levillez represented Belgium on the Committee on Women in the NATO Forces and served for a time as its vice-president. On July 1, 2015 she resigned from active service.
