= Middle Eastern Cold War =

Middle Eastern Cold War may refer to:

- The 1979–present Iran–Saudi Arabia proxy war, sometimes called the Middle East Cold War
  - The 2011–2021 Qatar–Saudi Arabia diplomatic conflict, between Qatar and Saudi Arabia, and is sometimes referred to as the Second Arab Cold War.
- The 1952–1991 Arab Cold War, new republics led by Egypt and traditionalist kingdoms, led by Saudi Arabia.
- The 1985–present Iran–Israel proxy conflict, sometimes called the Iran–Israel Cold War

== See also ==
- Arab–Israeli War (disambiguation)
- Syrian War (disambiguation)
