= Kapitänleutnant =

Naval rank of Germany

Captain lieutenant Kapitänleutnant
- shoulder board / cuff title / mounting loop
- Country: Germany
- Service branch: German Navy
- Abbreviation: KptLt
- Rank: Commissioned officer
- NATO rank code: OF-2
- Non-NATO rank: A11 or A12
- Next higher rank: Stabskapitänleutnant; Korvettenkapitän
- Next lower rank: Oberleutnant zur See
- Equivalent ranks: Hauptmann

Kapitänleutnant, short: KptLt/in lists: KL, (English: captain lieutenant or lieutenant captain) is an officer grade of the captains' military hierarchy group (German: Hauptleute) of the modern German Bundeswehr. The rank is rated OF-2 in NATO, and equivalent to Hauptmann in the Heer and Luftwaffe. It is grade A11 or A12 in the pay rules of the Federal Ministry of Defence.

The rank first appeared in the German Empire and continued in use through the Weimar Republic and into the Third Reich.

== Address ==
In line with ZDv 10/8, the formal manner of addressing people with the rank Kapitänleutnant is "Herr/Frau Kapitänleutnant". However, in German tradition and in line with seamen's language, the title is abbreviated to "Herr/Frau Kaleu" in verbal communication (contemporary usage, pronounced "Ka'loy"). Historically, in the Wehrmacht, the abbreviation spoken was "Herr Kaleun".

== Rank and assignment ==
The United States Navy's rank of lieutenant is equal to Kapitänleutnant in NATO's military hierarchy (classed as OF-2). However, German Navy Kapitänleutnant might be assigned to the so-called "line officer career" (de: Truppendienstlaufbahn or Truppendienstoffizier) or "officer specialist career" (de: Fachdienstlaufbahn or Fachdienstoffizier, officially: Offizier des militärfachlichen Dienstes).

Its rank insignia, worn on the sleeves and shoulders, are one golden five-pointed star above two golden stripes with one half stripes between them (without the star when rank loops are worn).

=== Line Officer career ===
A Kapitänleutnant (line officer) may command smaller ships (e.g., submarine class 206A, minehunter class 332) or serve as principal warfare officer on larger warships, giving the rank responsibilities more along those of a Lieutenant commander in the U.S. or Royal navies.

junior Rank; Oberleutnant zur See	German Navy officer rank (Line officer career)	senior Rank; Korvettenkapitän (Line officer grad)
junior Rank; Oberleutnant zur See	Kapitänleutnant (Hauptmann)	senior Rank; Korvettenkapitän (Line officer grad)

The sequence of ranks (top-down approach) in that particular group is as follows:

- OF-5: Kapitän zur See / Oberst
- OF-4: Fregattenkapitän / Oberstleutnant
- OF-3: Korvettenkapitän / Major
- OF-2: Kapitänleutnant / Hauptmann

=== Officer Specialist career ===
Kapitänleutnant might be a senior officer specialist rank, comparable to US warrant officer, however, junior to Stabskapitänleutnant. Military people of the "line officer career" skip over the rank Stabskapitänleutnant, by regular promotion from Kapitänleutnant (OF-2) to Korvettenkapitän (OF-3).

junior rank Oberleutnant zur See	German Navy officer rank (Warrant officer career)'	senior rank Stabskapitänleutnant
junior rank Oberleutnant zur See	Kapitänleutnant (Hauptmann)	senior rank Stabskapitänleutnant

The sequence of ranks (top-down approach) in that particular group is as follows:

- OF-2a: Stabskapitänleutnant / Stabshauptmann
- OF-2b: Kapitänleutnant / Hauptmann
- OF-1a: Oberleutnant zur See / Oberleutnant
- OF-1b: Leutnant zur See / Leutnant

== Bibliography ==
- Mallmann Showell, Jak P. (2002) [1999]. German Navy Handbook 1939–1945. Stroud, UK: Sutton Publishing. ISBN 0-7509-3205-8.
