= Senior captain =

Rank between captain and major/commodore

Senior captain is a rank which is used in some countries' armed forces, navies, merchant marines, civil aviation and in the airline industry.

== Army ==
In some armies of the world, "senior captain" is a rank between a regular captain and a major. The rank is often only found in armies and air forces. A similar position to that of navy senior captain is the rank of senior colonel.

=== Asian armies ===
The rank of da wei (大尉) was used by the People's Liberation Army between 1955 and 1965, and was often translated as senior captain. However, the ranks and insignia derive from the practice of the Soviet Army, which had, like the Red Army before it and the Russian Army today, four company-grade officer ranks: one captain rank and three lieutenant ranks. The literal translations of those four ranks in Chinese are junior(-grade) officer, mid(-grade) officer, upper(-grade) officer, and senior(-grade) officer. Since the PLA today uses only three ranks of company grade officer, it has become conventional to translate shang wei (上尉) which originally corresponded to the Soviet rank of senior lieutenant, as captain, and hence da wei, which corresponded to the Soviet rank of captain, as senior captain. The corresponding fourth junior office rank of the Vietnamese Army, đại úy, is usually translated as captain.

In the Afghan National Army and the Afghan National Police, between the ranks of turan (captain) and Jagran (major) is the rank of jag turan. In the case of the Afghan National Police, the rank of jag turan is most commonly translated as "staff captain".

=== European armies ===
The rank of senior captain is rare in Western militaries, but can be found in the German military, where the rank of Stabshauptmann (Stabskapitänleutnant in the Navy) was created in 1993 for officers of the Militärfachlicher Dienst (former NCOs in specialist positions) who could not be promoted to field grade. The Belgian Armed Forces use the rank of captain-commandant as a standard rank. Italy uses a title of primo capitano for captains (army, air force and Carabinieri) that have held the rank of captain for a long time, currently nine years or longer.

In the Czechoslovak Army (and the Czechoslovak People's Army) until 1954, the rank of štábní kapitán (staff captain) was the equivalent rank.

Historically, the British Army used the title of First Captain to identify the company commander in each regiment who was senior to the other company commanders.

The Serbian Armed Forces have been using the rank of Senior captain (капетан I класе) since 1860. The rank was used by the Royal Serbian Army and Royal Yugoslav Army until 1945. The new communist government has reintroduced rank of Senior captain in 1952 for Yugoslav People's Army. It was used in Armed Forces of Serbia and Montenegro until 2006. In December 2019 Ministry of Defence has decided to reintroduce rank of Senior captain into Serbian Armed Forces.

=== Senior captain's insignia ===
Stabshauptmann
(English: Staff captain)
(German Army)

Capitán primero
(English: First captain)
(Guatemalan Army)

Primo capitano
(English: First captain)
(Italian Army)

Capitán primero
(English: First captain)
(Mexican Army)

== Navy ==
In some countries of the world, there is the rank of senior captain. It is also known as commodore or flotilla captain, and captain-commander. A naval senior captain is typically equivalent to the army's senior colonel or brigadier general rank.

== Merchant marine or merchant navy ==
In some merchant marines or merchant navies of the world, some shipmasters, with certified particular and recognized seniority in terms of true and effective ocean-going ships' command, are distinguished with the high honorific title of senior captain, officially written and reported as Senior Captain abbreviated as: --------> Sr CAPT, Sr. CAPT or, as Snr Capt.; moreover, under ancient maritime traditions, they are referred also to as commodore, abbreviated in Codre, Cdre, CDRE or CMDE. The most Senior Captain between company Senior Captains held the rank of Supreme Senior Captain, the highest civilian hierarchy in the Merchant Marine Company Fleet. Known also as the 'Master of Masters', he served as the Fleet Operations Director or as the Fleet Operations Manager, overseeing the most experienced captains after a lifetime spent crossing the world's oceans.

== Civil aviation and in the airline industry ==
In civil aviation, the position of "senior captain" is a contractual employment position, corresponding to the maximum achievable level for the "captains" of both fixed-wing and rotary-wing civil aviation aircraft, and dependent on particular seniority requirements. It is followed in descending order by the "first captain". In the airline industry, "senior captains" may perform a coordination role in the organization of the shifts and the service of the air-navigation personnel.

== United States Revenue Cutter Service ==
The rank of senior captain was used by the Revenue Cutter Service to denote a rank equivalent to a U.S. Navy commander and was established in 1908 during an overhaul of service rank structures by Congress. The rank and title of captain-commandant denoted the head of the Revenue Cutter Service and was superior to the rank of senior captain. The captain-commandant was equivalent in rank to a navy captain. A Revenue Cutter Service captain was equivalent to a navy lieutenant commander at the time.

== Notes ==
=== References cited ===
- Johnson, Robert Irwin (1987). Guardians of the Sea, History of the United States Coast Guard, 1915 to the Present. Naval Institute Press, Annapolis, Maryland. ISBN 978-0-87021-720-3.
- Larzelere, Alex (2003). The Coast Guard in World War I: An Untold Story. Naval Institute Press, Annapolis, Maryland. ISBN 978-1-55750-476-0.
