= Arab–Israeli War =

Arab–Israeli war may refer to:

- 1947–1948 civil war in Mandatory Palestine
- 1948 Palestine war, known as the First Arab–Israeli War
  - 1948 Arab–Israeli War, part of the 1948 Palestine war
- Suez Crisis (1956), known as the Second Arab–Israeli War
- Six-Day War (1967), known as the Third Arab–Israeli War
- War of Attrition (1967–1970), a war between Israel, Egypt, Jordan, Syria, and the PLO
- Yom Kippur War (1973), known as the Fourth Arab–Israeli War
- 1982 Lebanon War, an Israel Defense Forces invasion of southern Lebanon in 1982–1985
- 2006 Lebanon War, a military conflict in Lebanon, northern Israel and the Golan Heights
- Gaza War (disambiguation)
  - Gaza War (2008–2009), an armed conflict between Israel and Palestinian militants in the Gaza Strip and Israel
  - 2012 Gaza War, Israeli military offensive in the Gaza strip
  - 2014 Gaza War, Israeli bombardment, Palestinian rocket attacks, and ground fighting

== Other ==
- Arab-Israeli Wars (game), a board game from Avalon Hill

== See also ==
- Arab–Israeli conflict, the conflict between Arab countries and Israel
  - Israeli–Palestinian conflict, the conflict between Israel and the Palestinian Arabs
    - Reprisal operations, military operations carried out by the Israel Defense Forces during the 1950s and 1960s
    - First Intifada, a Palestinian uprising against the Israeli occupation of the Palestinian Territories in 1987–1993
    - Second Intifada, a Palestinian uprising against Israeli occupation in 2000–2005
    - 2021 Israel–Palestine crisis, tensions in Jerusalem led to eleven days of fighting between Israel and Gazan militant groups
  - Israeli–Lebanese conflict
    - South Lebanon conflict (disambiguation)
      - Palestinian insurgency in South Lebanon, a conflict initiated by Palestinian militants based in South Lebanon upon Israel in 1968–1982
      - South Lebanon conflict (1985–2000), warfare involving Israel Defense Forces and its Lebanese proxy militias and Lebanese Muslim guerrillas in South Lebanon
      - 1978 South Lebanon conflict, an invasion of Lebanon up to the Litani River by the Israel Defense Forces
- List of wars involving Israel
- Middle Eastern Cold War (disambiguation)
