= Belgian Medical Service =

Belgian Medical Services
- Medische Dienst (Dutch); Service Médical (French)
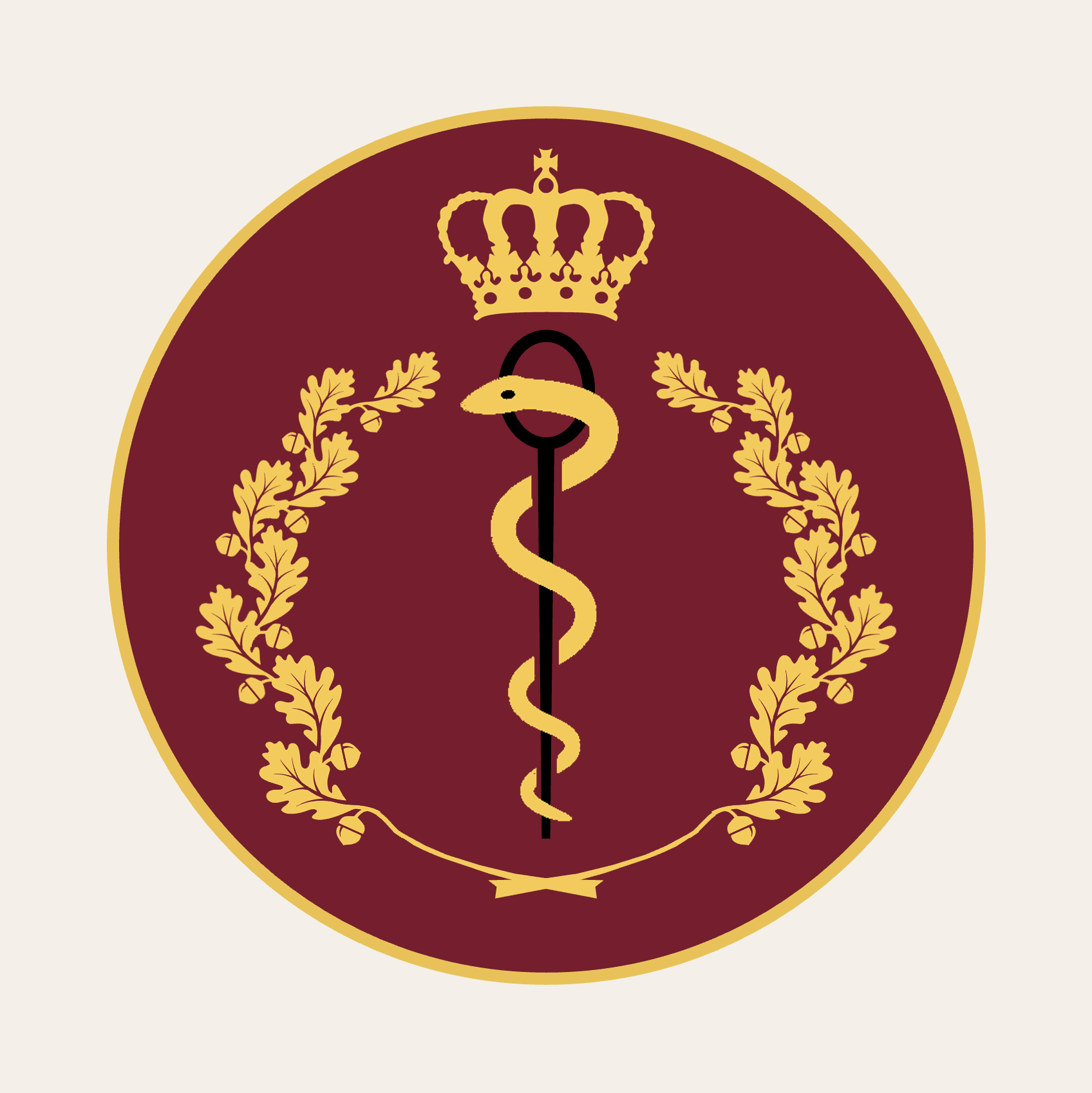
- Insignia of the Belgian Medical Services
- Active: 2002–present
- Country: Belgium
- Allegiance: King of the Belgians
- Size: 1,855 active personnel (2025)
- Part of: Belgian Armed Forces

Commanders
- Commander: Brigadier general An Van Rompay

The Belgian Medical Services of the Belgian Armed Forces (Dutch: Medische Dienst, French: Service Médical) is the military medical service which provides medical support for its members in home and abroad operations, participating in humanitarian aid and providing certain services to the civilian society. The current Commander of the Belgian Medical Services is Brigadier general An Van Rompay (since June 2026).

== Organization ==
The Belgian Medical Services is commanded by a Major General and has the following organization:

- Belgian Medical Services Operational Command (COMOPSMED), in Evere
  - Belgian Medical Services Competence Centre, in Neder-Over-Heembeek
  - Queen Astrid Military Hospital, in Neder-Over-Heembeek
  - 14th Medical Battalion, in Peutie and Lombardsijde
    - Headquarters and Services Company, 3x medical companies (one company supports the Belgian Air Force, one company supports the Belgian Navy, and one Paracommando qualified company supports the Special Operations Regiment)
  - 23rd Medical Battalion, in Leopoldsburg and Marche-en-Famenne
    - Headquarters and Services Company, 3x medical companies (supporting the Belgian Army including units of the Motorized Brigade)
  - 5th Medical Supplies and Distribution Element, in Nivelles

== Ranks ==
=== Officer ranks ===
NATO code	OF-10	OF-9	OF-8	OF-7	OF-6	OF-5	OF-4	OF-3		OF-2	OF-1
(Belgium) Belgian Medical Service
(Belgium) Belgian Medical Service		Generaal	Luitenant-generaal	Generaal-majoor	Brigadegeneraal	Kolonel	Luitenant-kolonel	Majoor	Kapitein-commandant	Kapitein	Luitenant	Onderluitenant
(Belgium) Belgian Medical Service		Général	Lieutenant général	Général-major	Général de Brigade	Colonel	Lieutenant-colonel	Major	Capitaine-commandant	Capitaine	Lieutenant	Sous-lieutenant
(Belgium) Belgian Medical Service		General	Generalleutnant	Generalmajor	Brigadegeneral	Oberst	Oberstleutnant	Major	Stabshauptmann	Hauptmann	Leutnant	Unterleutnant

=== Other ranks ===
NATO code	OR-9		OR-8	OR-7	OR-6		OR-5	OR-4		OR-3	OR-2	OR-1
(Belgium) Belgian Medical Service
(Belgium) Belgian Medical Service	Adjudant-Majoor	Adjudant-chef	Adjudant	1ste sergeant-majoor	1ste sergeant-chef	1ste sergeant	Sergeant	1ste korporaal-chef	Korporaal-chef	Korporaal	1ste soldaat	Soldaat
(Belgium) Belgian Medical Service	Adjudant-Major	Adjudant-chef	Adjudant	1e sergent-major	1e sergent-chef	1e sergent	sergent	1e caporal-chef	Caporal-chef	Caporal	1e soldat	Soldat
(Belgium) Belgian Medical Service	Majoradjutant	Chefadjudant	Adjudant	1er Sergeant Major	1er Sergeant Chef	1er Sergeant	Sergeant	1er Korporal Chef	Korporal Chef	Korporal	1er soldat	Soldat

== Equipment ==
=== Weapons ===
- FN Five-seven mk2
- FN P90

=== Vehicles ===
- Agusta A109 Medevac from Air Component
- John Deere M-Gator
- Pandur 6X6 Ambulance from Land Component (Driven and Maintained by Motorized Brigade Personnel)
- Renault Premium Cargo
- Toyota Land Cruiser
- Unimog Ambulance 4X4
- Volvo 10T
- Volvo Recovery
- Volkswagen Ambulance LT35
- Refrigerator Plasma Volvo (Thermoking)
- Jeep 4X4 Bombardier
- Volvo 10T Cargo (6X4)
- Ford Transit Ambulance

== Princely Members ==
- Princess Astrid of Belgium is Colonel of the Belgian Medical Services.
