= John Francis Burnes =

US Marine Corps officer (1883–1918)

- Born: July 12, 1883; Binghamton, New York, U.S.
- Died: June 14, 1918 (aged 34); Belleau Wood, France
- Burial place: Arlington National Cemetery
- Military career
- Allegiance: United States
- Branch: United States Marine Corps
- Service years: 1904–1918
- Rank: Captain
- Nickname: Martin J. Maher
- Conflicts: World War I; Battle of Belleau Wood (DOW)
- Awards: Distinguished Service Cross, Navy Cross, Silver Star Citation

John Francis Burnes (July 12, 1883 – June 14, 1918) was an officer in the United States Marine Corps during World War I and the first Marine Mustang.

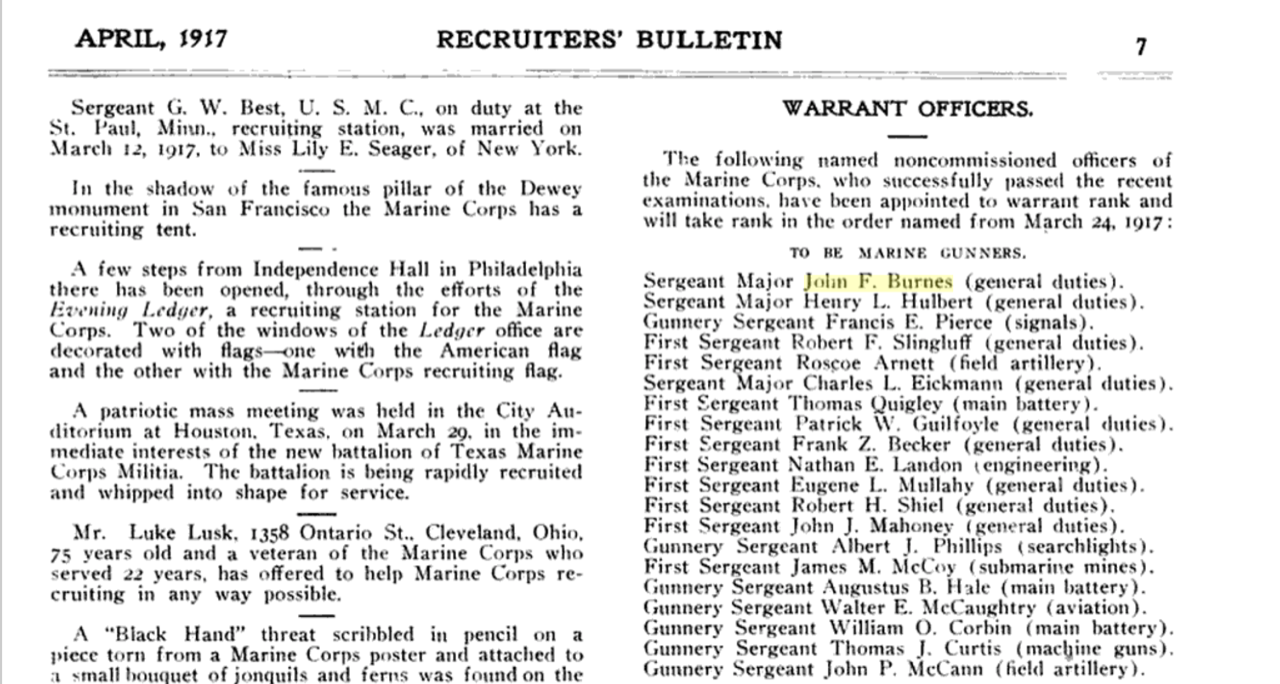
USMC Marine Gunners 1917

== Early life ==
He was born in Binghamton, New York, as Martin J. Maher, son of Martin C. Maher and Bridget Kelley. He grew up in Corning, New York, and, in the 1900 US Census, was listed as working as an iron moulder in that city.

== Military career ==
He enlisted in the Marine Corps in June 1904 under the name John Francis Burnes.

His overseas stations include Panama (1904, 1913), Santo Domingo (1905), Cuba (1906–1909), the Philippine Islands (1909–1910, 18 Jul 1913 – 30 Sep 1913), Nicaragua (5 Sep 1912 – 16 Jan 1913), Peking (1914), and France (1918). He was promoted to 1st sergeant in May 1907 and to sergeant major on 28 Sep 1916.

On December 9, 1916, in a letter signed (by direction) by John A. LeJeune, Burnes was "designated to take the examination for appointment as Marine Gunner (General Duties)". Burnes passed those examinations with a final average of 96.46%, and on 24 March 1917, Secretary of the Navy Josephus Daniels signed off on the appointment, making Burnes a Marine Mustang. Burnes was discharged from his enlistment so that he could accept the appointment as Marine Gunner (a rank equivalent to Chief Warrant Officer).

The US entered WW1 in April 1917, and military promotions were accelerated. Burnes was commissioned as a 1stLt (temporary) on 2 June 1917 and then as a Captain (temporary) on June 3, 1917.

He served with the 74th Company in the 6th Regiment of the USMC in France, where his gallant service in battle was recognized posthumously by the Distinguished Service Cross. "In the attack on the Bois de Belleau, June 12, 1918, he was badly wounded but completed the disposition of his platoon under violent fire. The injuries which he sustained in the performance of this self-sacrificing duty later caused his death." He was also awarded the Navy Cross and a Silver Star citation.

His remains were repatriated in July 1921, and he is buried in Arlington National Cemetery (Section Sou., Lot 4472 WH).

== Awards and decorations ==
=== Navy Cross ===

Citation:

The President of the United States of America takes pride in presenting the Navy Cross (Posthumously) to Captain John F. Burnes (MCSN: 0-2061), United States Marine Corps, for extraordinary heroism while serving with the Sixth Regiment (Marines), 2d Division, A.E.F. in action in the attack on Bois-de-Belleau, France, 12 June 1918. Captain Burnes was badly wounded, but completed the disposition of his platoon under violent fire. The injuries which he sustained in the performance of this self-sacrificing duty later caused his death.

=== Distinguished Service Cross ===
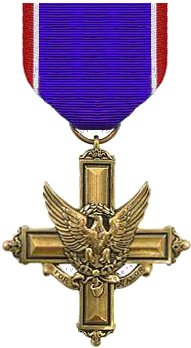

Citation:

The President of the United States of America, authorized by Act of Congress, July 9, 1918, takes pride in presenting the Distinguished Service Cross (Posthumously) to Captain John F. Burnes (MCSN: 0-2061), United States Marine Corps, for extraordinary heroism while serving with the Sixth Regiment (Marines), 2d Division, A.E.F., in action in the attack on Bois-de-Belleau, France, June 12, 1918. Captain Burnes was badly wounded, but completed the disposition of his platoon under violent fire. The injuries which he sustained in the performance of this self-sacrificing duty later caused his death.

=== Comendations ===
Capt Burnes' awards include:

1st Row	Navy Cross	Distinguished Service Cross	Purple Heart
2nd Row	Marine Corps Good Conduct Medal with 4 Service stars	World War I Victory Medal	Nicaraguan Campaign Medal
Badges	Expert marksmanship badge for rifle (3rd award)		Expert marksmanship badge for pistol (4th award)

== Namesake ==
The destroyer USS John Francis Burnes (DD-299) was named for him.
