= Korvettenkapitän =

German military rank in the navy

Korvettenkapitän (German: [kɔʁˈvɛtn̩kapiˌtɛːn]; English: Corvette captain) is the lowest ranking senior officer in the German navy.

== Germany ==
Corvette captain Korvettenkapitän
- Country: Germany
- Service branch: German Navy
- Abbreviation: KKpt
- Rank group: Field officer
- NATO rank code: OF-3
- Next higher rank: Fregattenkapitän
- Next lower rank: Kapitänleutnant
- Equivalent ranks: Major

Korvettenkapitän, short: KKpt/in lists: KK, (English: Corvette captain) is the lowest senior officer rank (German: Stabsoffizier Rang) in the German Navy.

=== Address ===
The official manner, in line to ZDv 10/8, of formal addressing of military people with the rank Korvettenkapitän (OF-3) is "Herr/Frau Korvettenkapitän". However, as to German naval traditions the "Korvettenkapitän" will be addressed "Herr/Frau Kapitän", often in line to seamen's language "Herr/Frau Kap'tän".

==== Rank insignia and rating ====
Rank insignia Korvettenkapitän, worn on the sleeves and shoulders, are one five-pointed star above three stripes (or rings on sleeves; without the star when rank loops are worn).

The rank is rated OF-3a in NATO, and equivalent to Major in Heer, and Luftwaffe. It is grade A13 in the pay rules of the Federal Ministry of Defence and is senior to the regular OF-2 rank of Kapitänleutnant (en: Lt), as well as to OF-2 Stabskapitänleutnant.

German Navy officer rank
Line officer career
junior rank Kapitänleutnant		Korvettenkapitän (Oberstabsarzt); Major	senior rank Fregattenkapitän
Warrant officer / officer specialist career
Kapitänleutnant	Stabskapitänleutnant	end of officer specialist career

=== History ===
==== German navies until 1945 ====
In the Imperial German Navy and Kriegsmarine the "Korvettenkapitän" was the lowest officer rank of the senior officer's rank group. The rank insignia consisted of shoulder strap and sleeve stripes. Shoulder straps had to be worn on uniform jackets and consisted of twisted silver-braids (without pip/star) on padding in navy blue weapon color.

Cuff insignia consisted of three stripes, and a five-point naval star above. The sleeve rings encircled the lower cuffs.

==== Volksmarine ====
Korvettenkapitän was in the Volksmarine of the GDR the lowest grade of the senior officer's rank group. It was comparable to Major of the NPA Land Force and Air Force.

The rank insignia consisted of shoulder strap and sleeve stripes. Shoulder straps had to be worn on uniform jackets and consisted of twisted silver-braids with one gold pip (star) on padding in navy blue weapon color.

Cuff insignia consisted of three stripes, and a five-point naval star above. In contradiction to Imperial German Navy tradition, where sleeve rings encircled the lower cuffs, the Volksmarine cuff strips formed 40% rings.

=== Insignia ===
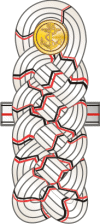
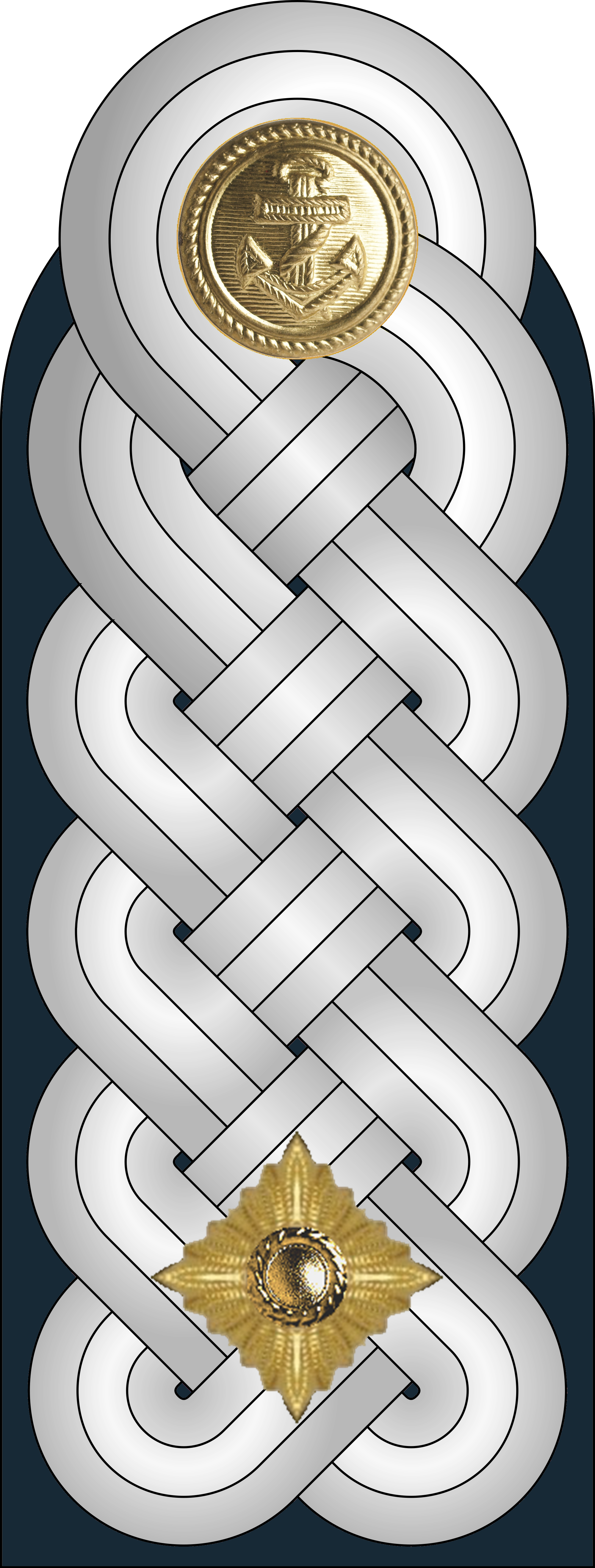
Insignia	Shoulder	Sleeve	Higher/lower rank
Imperial German Navy			Fregattenkapitän Kapitänleutnant
Reichsmarine			Fregattenkapitän Kapitänleutnant
Kriegsmarine			Fregattenkapitän Kapitänleutnant
Volksmarine			Fregattenkapitän Kapitänleutnant
German Navy			Fregattenkapitän Kapitänleutnant
