= Fregattenkapitän =

Germanic military rank in the navy

Fregattenkapitän (English: Frigate captain) is the middle ranking senior officer in a number of Germanic-speaking navies.

== Germany ==
Fregattenkapitän
- Country: Germany
- Service branch: German Navy
- Abbreviation: FKpt
- Rank group: Senior officer
- NATO rank code: OF-4
- Formation: ?
- Next higher rank: Kapitän zur See
- Next lower rank: Korvettenkapitän
- Equivalent ranks: Oberstleutnant

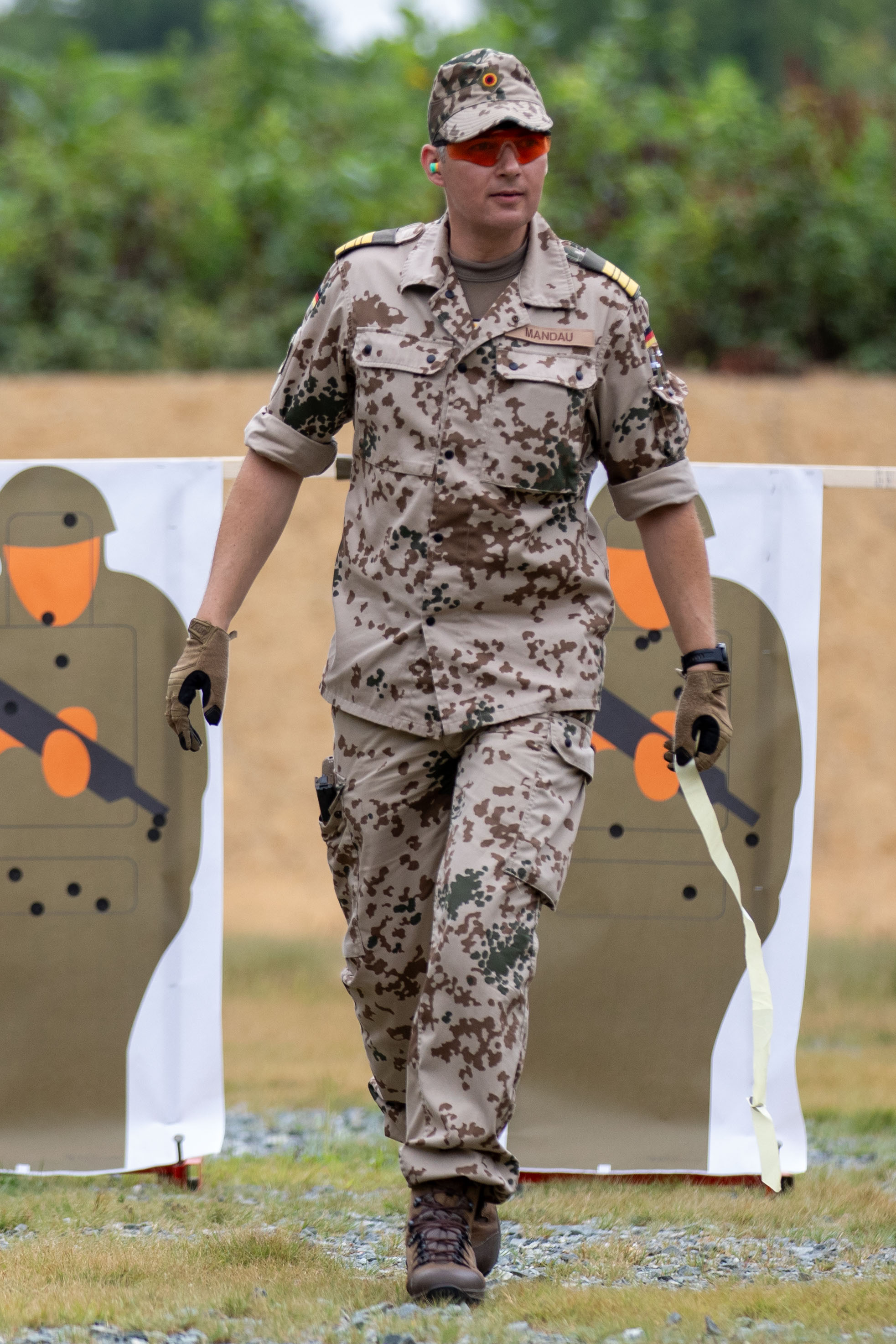
A Fregattenkapitän at a shooting exercise

Fregattenkapitän, short: FKpt / in lists: FK, is the middle Senior officer rank (German: Stabsoffizier Rang) in the German Navy.

It is the equivalent of frigate captain or commander in other navies, and the equivalent of Oberstleutnant in the German army and air force.

=== Address ===
In line with ZDv 10/8, the official manner of formally addressing military personnel holding the rank of Fregattenkapitän (OF-4) is "Herr/Frau Fregattenkapitän". However, following German naval tradition the "Fregattenkapitän" is usually addressed as "Herr/Frau Kapitän" or in seamen's language as "Herr/Frau Kap'tän".

=== Rank insignia and rating ===
Rank insignia Fregattenkapitän, worn on the sleeves and shoulders, are one five-pointed star above three stripes and a half stripe between stripe two and one (or rings on sleeves; without the star when rank loops are worn).

The rank is rated OF-4 in NATO, and is equivalent to Oberstleutnant in Heer, and Luftwaffe. It is domiciled at the A14 and A15 pay scale of the Federal Ministry of Defence and is senior to the rank of Korvettenkapitän (NATO OF-3 - Commander Junior Grade).

Whereas the equivalent ranks (with the same insignia stripes) in Belgium and Denmark are NATO-translated as Commander Senior Grade, the German equivalent is simply termed Commander.

=== History ===
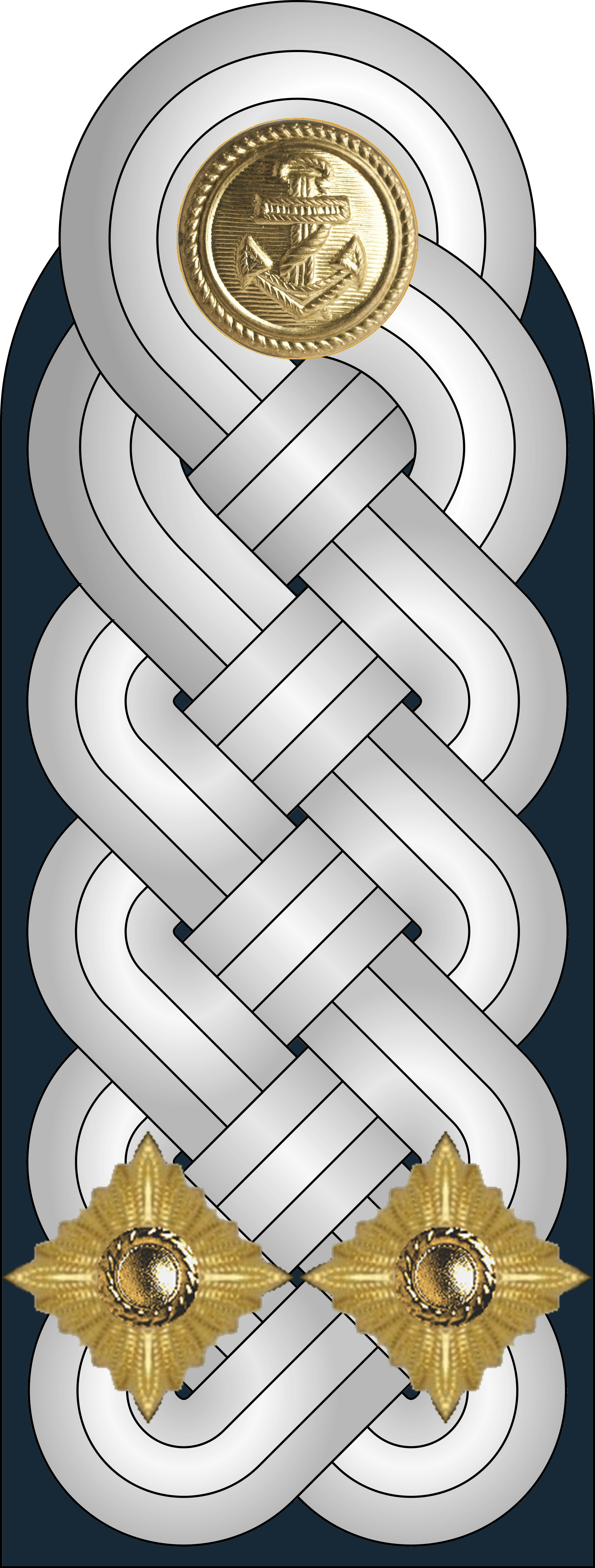
Insignia	Shoulder	Sleeve	Higher/lower rank
Imperial German Navy			Kapitän zur See Korvettenkapitän
Reichsmarine			Kapitän zur See Korvettenkapitän
Kriegsmarine			Kapitän zur See Korvettenkapitän
Volksmarine			Kapitän zur See Korvettenkapitän
German Navy			Kapitän zur See Korvettenkapitän

== See also ==
- Frigate Captain
- Commander
