= USS John Francis Burnes =

Clemson-class destroyer

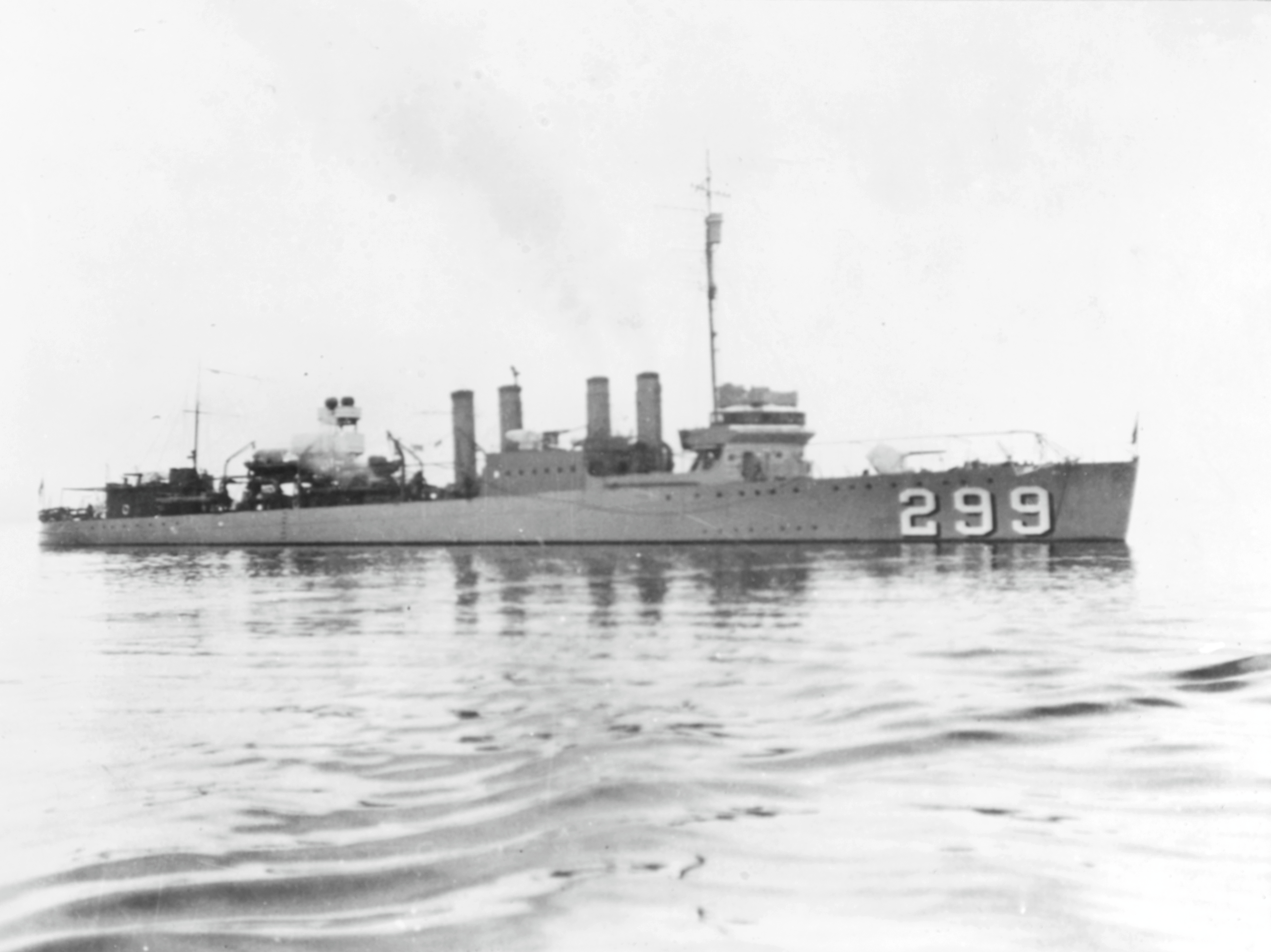

History

United States
- Namesake: John Francis Burnes
- Builder: Bethlehem Shipbuilding Corporation, Union Iron Works, San Francisco
- Laid down: 4 July 1918
- Launched: 10 November 1918
- Commissioned: 1 May 1920
- Decommissioned: 25 February 1930
- Stricken: 22 July 1930
- Fate: Sold for scrap, 10 June 1931

General characteristics
- Class & type: Clemson-class destroyer
- Displacement: 1,290 long tons (1,311 t) (standard); 1,389 long tons (1,411 t) (deep load)
- Length: 314 ft 4 in (95.8 m)
- Beam: 30 ft 11 in (9.42 m)
- Draught: 10 ft 3 in (3.1 m)
- Installed power: 27,000 shp (20,000 kW); 4 water-tube boilers
- Propulsion: 2 shafts, 2 steam turbines
- Speed: 35 knots (65 km/h; 40 mph) (design)
- Range: 2,500 nautical miles (4,600 km; 2,900 mi) at 20 knots (37 km/h; 23 mph) (design)
- Complement: 6 officers, 108 enlisted men
- Armament: 4 × single 4-inch (102 mm) guns; 2 × single 1-pounder AA guns or; 2 × single 3-inch (76 mm) guns; 4 × triple 21 inch (533 mm) torpedo tubes; 2 × depth charge rails

USS John Francis Burns (DD-299) was a Clemson-class destroyer built for the United States Navy during World War I.

== Description ==
The Clemson class was a repeat of the preceding Wickes class although more fuel capacity was added. The ships displaced 1,290 long tons (1,311 t) at standard load and 1,389 long tons (1,411 t) at deep load. They had an overall length of 314 feet 4 inches (95.8 m), a beam of 30 feet 11 inches (9.4 m) and a draught of 10 feet 3 inches (3.1 m). They had a crew of 6 officers and 108 enlisted men.

Performance differed radically between the ships of the class, often due to poor workmanship. The Clemson class was powered by two steam turbines, each driving one propeller shaft, using steam provided by four water-tube boilers. The turbines were designed to produce a total of 27,000 shaft horsepower (20,000 kW) intended to reach a speed of 35 knots (65 km/h; 40 mph). The ships carried a maximum of 371 long tons (377 t) of fuel oil which was intended gave them a range of 2,500 nautical miles (4,600 km; 2,900 mi) at 20 knots (37 km/h; 23 mph).

The ships were armed with four 4-inch (102 mm) guns in single mounts and were fitted with two 1-pounder guns for anti-aircraft defense. In many ships a shortage of 1-pounders caused them to be replaced by 3-inch (76 mm) guns. Their primary weapon, though, was their torpedo battery of a dozen 21 inch (533 mm) torpedo tubes in four triple mounts. They also carried a pair of depth charge rails. A "Y-gun" depth charge thrower was added to many ships.

== Construction and career ==
John Francis Burnes, named for John Francis Burnes, formerly Swasey, was laid down 4 July 1918 by the Bethlehem Shipbuilding Corporation, San Francisco, California; launched 10 November 1918; sponsored by Mrs. Julius Kahn; and commissioned 1 May 1920. Following shakedown and training exercises during the summer of 1920, John Francis Burnes engaged in fleet maneuvers during October. For the next 2 years she continued tactical exercises along the California coast, operating out of San Diego, California, her home port. She sailed 6 February 1923 for exercises off Mexico and the Panama Canal Zone. Following her return in April, John Francis Burnes operated out of California for 2 years with the exception of fleet maneuvers in the Caribbean in early 1924. One year later she participated in joint Army-Navy maneuvers out of San Francisco, California before joining fleet operations in Hawaii 27 April 1925. The destroyer then cruised with a large force in the Pacific, visiting Samoa, Australia, and New Zealand before returning to San Diego in September.

For the next 3 years she engaged in training operations and fleet maneuvers along the West Coast, developing the techniques in naval warfare. During the summers of 1928 and 1929, John Francis Burnes engaged in reserve training cruises. John Francis Burnes arrived in San Diego 28 August 1929 and remained there until she decommissioned 25 February 1930. She was stricken from the Naval Vessel Register on 22 July 1930 and sold as scrap metal 10 June 1931 in accordance with the London Treaty for the limitation of naval armaments.

As of 2005, no other ship in the United States Navy has been named John Francis Burnes.
