= Stabskapitänleutnant =

Rank in the German Navy

- shoulder board / cuff title / mounting loop
- Country: Germany
- Service branch: German Navy
- Abbreviation: StKptLt
- NATO rank code: OF-2
- Non-NATO rank: A13
- Formation: 1993
- Next lower rank: Kapitänleutnant
- Equivalent ranks: Stabshauptmann

Stabskapitänleutnant, short: StKptLt / in lists: SKL, (English: Staffcaptain lieutenant) is the highest Fachdienstoffizier rank (en: specialist officer, comparable to US limited duty officer) in the German Navy.

The rank is rated OF-2a in NATO, and equivalent to Stabshauptmann in Heer, and Luftwaffe. It is grade A13 in the pay rules of the Federal Ministry of Defence and is senior to the regular OF-2 rank of Kapitänleutnant (en: Lt).

== Address ==
The official manner, in line to ZDv 10/8, of formal addressing of military people with the rank Stabskapitänleutnant (OF-2a) is "Herr/Frau Stabskapitänleutnant". However, as to German traditions and in line to seamen's language the "Stabskapitänleutnant" will be addressed "Herr/Frau Kaleu".

== Rank insignia ==
Its rank insignia, worn on the sleeves and shoulders, are one five-pointed star above two stripes with two half stripes between them (without the star when rank loops are worn).

== Particularity ==
Military people of the "line officer career" (German: Truppendienstoffizier/ Truppendienstlaufbahn) skip over this rank, by regular promotion from Kapitänleutnant (OF-2) to Korvettenkapitän (OF-3); however, the pay grade A13 (Stabskapitänleutnant and Korvettenkapitän) is identical.

German Navy officer rank
Limited duty officer / officer specialist career
junior rank Kapitänleutnant	Stabskapitänleutnant Stabshauptmann	end of career
Line officer career
Kapitänleutnant		senior rank Korvettenkapitän

The sequence of ranks (top-down approach) in that particular group is as follows:

- OF-2a: Stabskapitänleutnant / Stabshauptmann
- OF-2: Kapitänleutnant / Hauptmann
- OF-1a: Oberleutnant zur See / Oberleutnant
- OF-1: Leutnant zur See / Leutnant

== See also ==
- Limited duty officer
