= Limited duty officer =

Class of officer in the US Navy

A limited duty officer (LDO) is an officer in the United States Navy or United States Marine Corps who was selected for commissioning based on skill and expertise. They are the primary manpower source for technically specific billets not best suited for traditional Unrestricted Line, Restricted Line, or Staff Corps career path officers. Per Title 10, U.S. Code, an LDO is a permanent commissioned officer appointed under section 8139 in a permanent grade above chief warrant officer, W-5, and designated for limited duty.

== Role ==
LDOs perform tasks similar to those of warrant officers (WO), but the formal definition differences are subtle and focus on the degree of authority and level of responsibility, as well as the breadth of required expertise. The term "limited duty" refers not to an LDO's authority, but rather the LDO's career progression and restrictions. Prior to World War II, a LDO could only advance as far as lieutenant (O-3E) in the Navy and captain (O-3E) in the Marine Corps. In later years, an LDO could be promoted to commander (O-5); in the Marine Corps, the senior LDO rank is lieutenant colonel (O-5). In the 1990s, the ceiling in most U.S. Navy LDO communities was raised to captain (O-6).

The Navy Mustang motto is "sursum ab ordine" which means "up from the ranks" to underline a distinction between Navy Mustangs and those Naval and Marine Corps officers commissioned directly from collegiate programs such as the United States Naval Academy, United States Merchant Marine Academy, Naval ROTC and Marine Corps Platoon Leaders Class, and similar post-collegiate pre-commissioning officer candidate programs of the Navy and Marine Corps such as Officer Candidate School and the former Aviation Officer Candidate School.

== Command ==
Unlike their unrestricted line officer (URL) brethren, most LDOs in the U.S. Navy cannot aspire to command a major warship, combat aviation squadron, or auxiliary vessel, although for a select few in the right communities, command is now a possibility, particularly command of shore installations and technical training schools. In the U.S. Marine Corps, some military occupational specialties (MOS) permit LDOs to be commanding officers. Many LDOs have qualified for command ashore of certain shore activities, ranging from activities such as small to medium-size Navy Operational Support Centers (formerly "Naval Reserve Centers") and Naval Support Activities at the lieutenant commander and commander level, to large activities such as the Naval Air Technical Training Center at the captain level. In general, they may succeed to command activities which have a primary function corresponding to their Navy officer designator or Marine Corps MOS.

LDOs are experts and leaders in the Navy enlisted rating or Marine Corps enlisted MOS from which they came. LDOs are considered more the officer and less the technician as compared to the chief warrant officer (CWO). LDOs will only be assigned to billets that are in their designator or MOS and that are designated as LDO billets. They may not be assigned to billets designated for U.S. Navy unrestricted line officers or their U.S. Marine Corps counterparts. This does not preclude an LDO from being assigned additional duties as deemed appropriate, including Joint duty.

In the U.S. Marine Corps, CWOs must serve a minimum of 8 years from the day they were initially promoted to WO in order to be eligible for the LDO program. This requirement may be waived to 5 years. Applicants must have less than 20 years of active duty service in order to be eligible for the LDO program (waiverable to 22 years in certain situations). When selected, the Marine is appointed a Captain (O-3E). Appointment to LDO also requires the completion of 10 years of commissioned service before being eligible for retirement. This program is managed within the Recruiting Command because it is not a promotion board, but rather an accession board.

In the U.S. Navy, LDOs and CWOs are former enlisted technicians (petty officers 1st class or chief petty officers for LDO and chief petty officer for CWO). They are experts and leaders in the technical specialty enlisted rates from which they came. In the Navy, first class petty officers (E-6) eligible for promotion to chief petty officer, and chief petty officers (E-7) and senior chief petty officers (E-8) with more than 8 but less than 14 years of service are eligible for the LDO program, while chief petty officers with 14-20 years of service, senior chief petty officers, and master chief petty officers are usually selected for the CWO program. However, CWOs can, and do, move into the LDO program, but do so as a lieutenant junior grade (O-2E).
