= Captain (armed forces) =

Army and air force officer rank

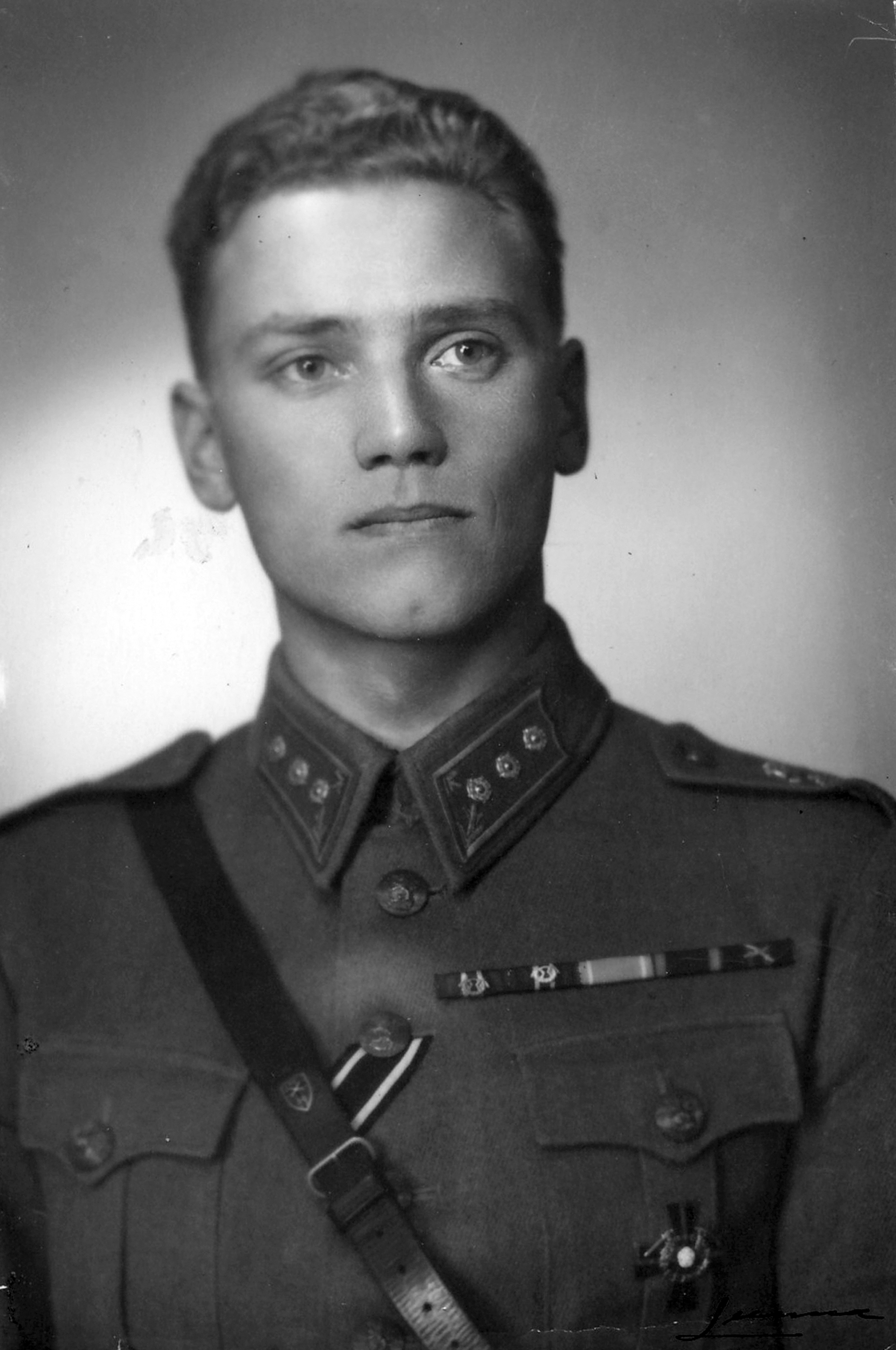
Lauri Törni, shown here in the Finnish Army in 1944, held the rank of Captain (or equivalent) in three different armed forces.

The army rank of captain (from the French: capitaine) is a commissioned officer rank historically corresponding to the command of a company of soldiers. The rank is also used by some air forces and marine forces, but usually refers to a more senior officer.

== History ==
The term ultimately goes back to Late Latin capitaneus meaning "head of [something]"; in Middle English adopted as capitayn in the 14th century, from Old French capitaine.

The military rank of captain was in use from the 1560s, referring to an officer who commands a company. The naval sense, an officer who commands a man-of-war, is somewhat earlier, from the 1550s, later extended in meaning to "master or commander of any kind of vessel". A captain in the period prior to the professionalization of the armed services of European nations subsequent to the French Revolution, during the early modern period, was a nobleman who purchased the right to head a company from the previous holder of that right. He would in turn receive money from another nobleman to serve as his lieutenant. The funding to provide for the troops did not come from the monarch or their government; the captain responsible for feeding, housing, and provisioning their company. If he was unable to support the company, or was otherwise court-martialed, he would be dismissed ("cashiered"), and the monarch would sell his commission to another nobleman to command the company. Otherwise, the only pension for the captain was selling the right to another nobleman when he was ready to retire.

== Modern usage ==
Today, a captain is typically either the commander or second-in-command of a company or artillery battery (or United States Army cavalry troop or Commonwealth squadron). In the Chinese People's Liberation Army, a captain may also command a company, or be the second-in-command of a battalion.

In some militaries, such as United States Army and Air Force and the British Army, captain is the entry-level rank for officer candidates possessing a professional degree, namely, most medical professionals (doctors, pharmacists, dentists) and lawyers. In the U.S. Army, lawyers who are not already officers at captain rank or above enter as lieutenants during training, and are promoted to the rank of captain after completion of their training if they are in the active component, or after a certain amount of time, usually one year from their date of commission as a lieutenant, for the reserve components.

The rank of captain should not be confused with the naval rank of captain, or with the UK-influenced air force rank of group captain, both of which are equivalent to the army rank of colonel.

== Air forces ==
Many air forces, such as the United States Air Force, use a rank structure and insignia similar to those of the army.

However, the United Kingdom's Royal Air Force, many other Commonwealth air forces and a few non-Commonwealth air forces use an air force-specific rank structure in which flight lieutenant is OF-2. A group captain is derived from the naval rank of captain.

Canada is a unique exception. Due to the unification of the Canadian Armed Forces in 1968, the air force rank titles are the same as those of the Canadian Army. However, like their Commonwealth counterparts, rank braids are pearl grey and increase in half strip increments. The decision was taken not to restore the historic rank titles for the RCAF due to it being deemed 'too confusing'.

== Insignia ==
Capitán
Argentine Army

Australian Army

Bangladesh Army

Belgian Army

Armed Forces of Bosnia and Herzegovina

Capitão
Brazilian Army

British Army/Royal Marines

Canadian Army

Colombian Army

Kapitán
Czech Republic Army

Kapteeni
Finnish Defence Force

Capitaine
French Army

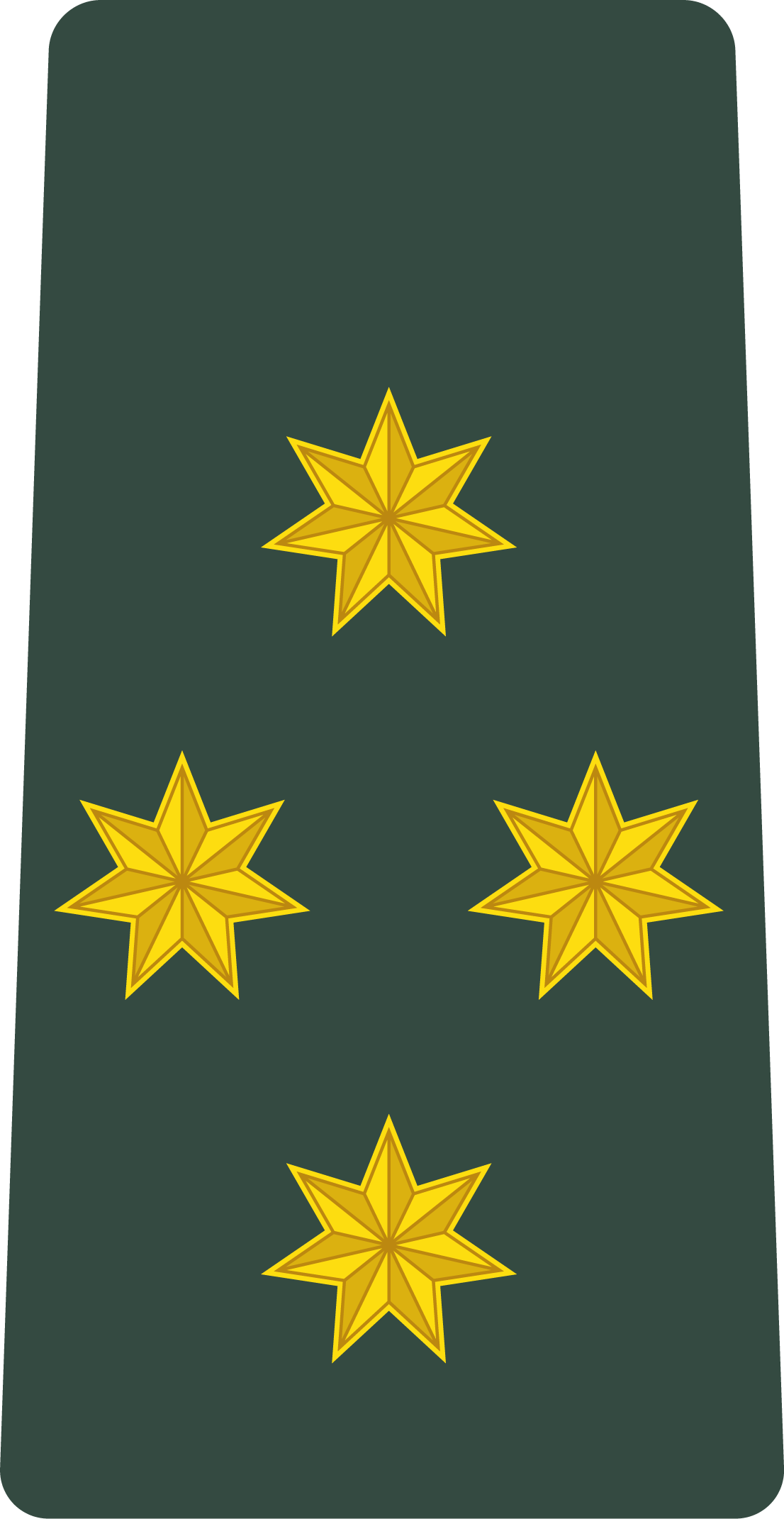
კაპიტანი (K’ap’it’ani) Georgian Army

Indian Army

Kapten
Indonesian Army

Captaen
Irish Army

Capitano
Italian Army

Kapitonas
Lithuanian Land Force

Капетан (Kapetan)
Macedonian Army

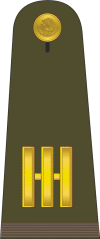
Capitán
Mexican Army

Kapitein
Royal Netherlands Army

Nepali Army

New Zealand Army

Kaptan
Pakistan Army

Capitán (Spanish)
Kapitán (Filipino)
Philippine Army

Captain
Republic of Singapore Armed Forces

Kaptein
South African Army

Sri Lanka Army

Kapten
Swedish Air Force

Kapten
Swedish Army

Yüzbaşı
Turkish Army

Yüzbaşı
Turkish Air Force

U.S. Army (dress)

U.S. Marine Corps

U.S. Air Force

U.S. Space Force

== See also ==
- Kapitan (rank)
- Captain (United Kingdom)
- Captain (United States)
- Senior captain
- Staff captain
- Katepano
- Rittmaster
