= Military ranks of Montenegro =

The Military ranks of Montenegro are the military insignia used by the Armed Forces of Montenegro.

== Current ranks ==
=== Commissioned officer ranks ===
The rank insignia of commissioned officers.

| NATO code | OF-10 | OF-9 | OF-8 | OF-7 | OF-6 | OF-5 | OF-4 | OF-3 | OF-2 | OF-1 |
|---|---|---|---|---|---|---|---|---|---|---|---|
| Montenegrin Ground Army |
| Montenegrin Ground Army | | General pukovnik | General potpukovnik | General major | Brigadir general | Pukovnik | Potpukovnik | Major | Kapetan | Poručnik | Potporučnik |
| Montenegrin Navy |
| Montenegrin Navy | | Admiral | Vice admiral | Kontra admiral | Komodor | Kapetan bojnog broda | Kapetan fregate | Kapetan korvete | Poručnik bojnog broda | Poručnik fregate | Poručnik korvete |
| Montenegrin Air Force |
| Montenegrin Air Force | | General pukovnik | General potpukovnik | General major | Brigadir general | Pukovnik | Potpukovnik | Major | Kapetan | Poručnik | Potporučnik |
| NATO code | OF-10 | OF-9 | OF-8 | OF-7 | OF-6 | OF-5 | OF-4 | OF-3 | OF-2 | OF-1 |

=== Other ranks ===
The rank insignia of non-commissioned officers and enlisted personnel.

| NATO code | OR-9 | OR-8 | OR-7 | OR-6 | OR-5 | OR-4 | OR-3 | OR-2 | OR-1 |
|---|---|---|---|---|---|---|---|---|---|
| Montenegrin Ground Army |
| Montenegrin Ground Army | Zastavnik 1 klase | Zastavnik | Stariji vodnik 1 klase | Stariji vodnik | Vodnik 1 klase | Vodnik | Mlađi vodnik | Desetar | Razvodnik |
| Montenegrin Navy |
| Montenegrin Navy | Zastavnik 1 klase | Zastavnik | Stariji vodnik 1 klase | Stariji vodnik | Vodnik 1 klase | Vodnik | Mlađi vodnik | Desetar | Razvodnik |
| Montenegrin Air Force |
| Montenegrin Air Force | Zastavnik 1 klase | Zastavnik | Stariji vodnik 1 klase | Stariji vodnik | Vodnik 1 klase | Vodnik | Mlađi vodnik | Desetar | Razvodnik |
| NATO code | OR-9 | OR-8 | OR-7 | OR-6 | OR-5 | OR-4 | OR-3 | OR-2 | OR-1 |

== Historic ranks ==
=== Commissioned officer ranks ===
The rank insignia of commissioned officers.

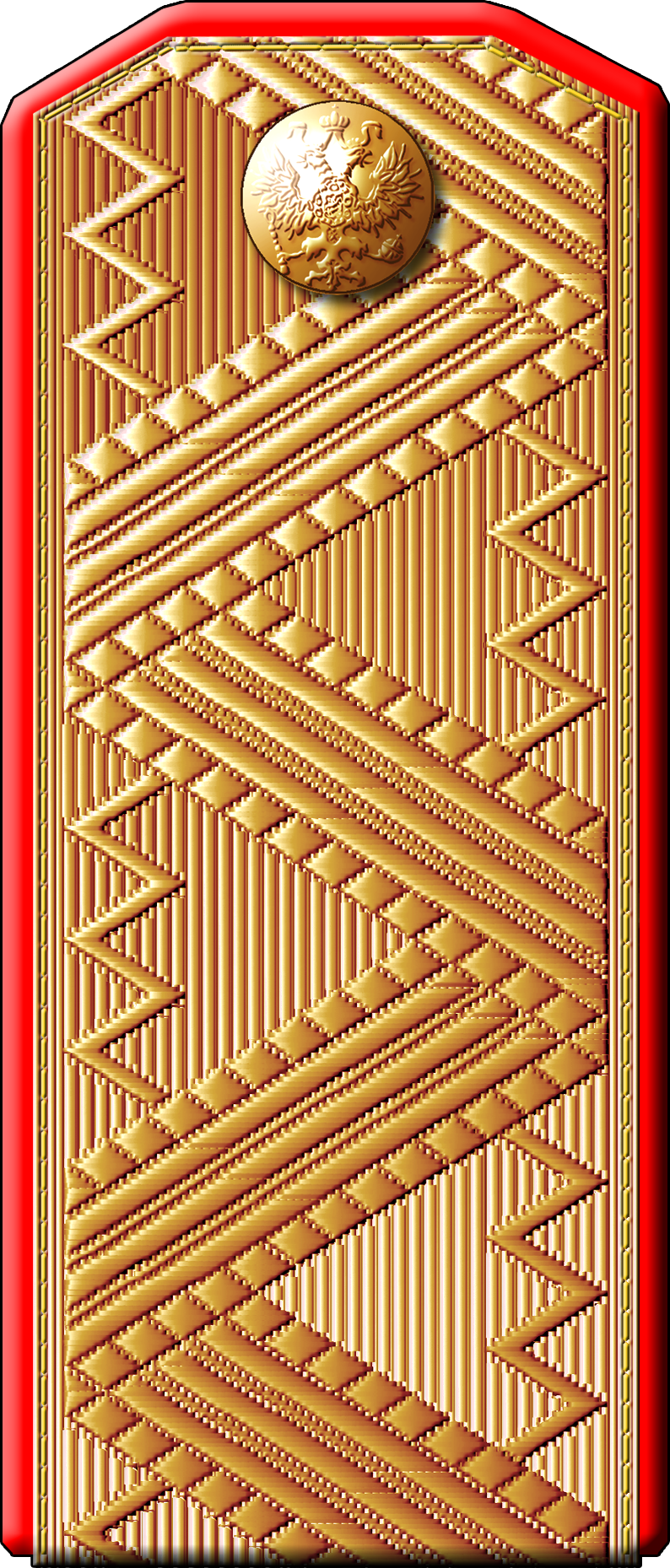
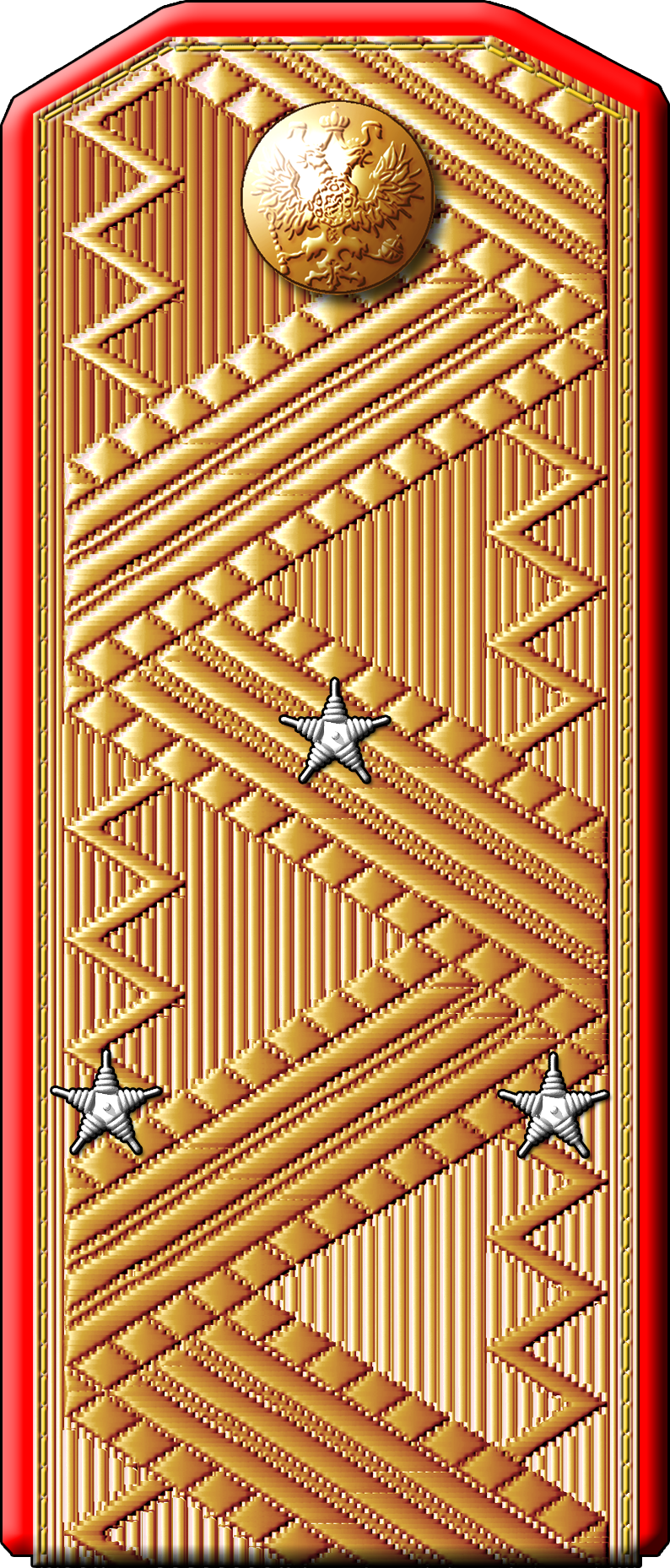
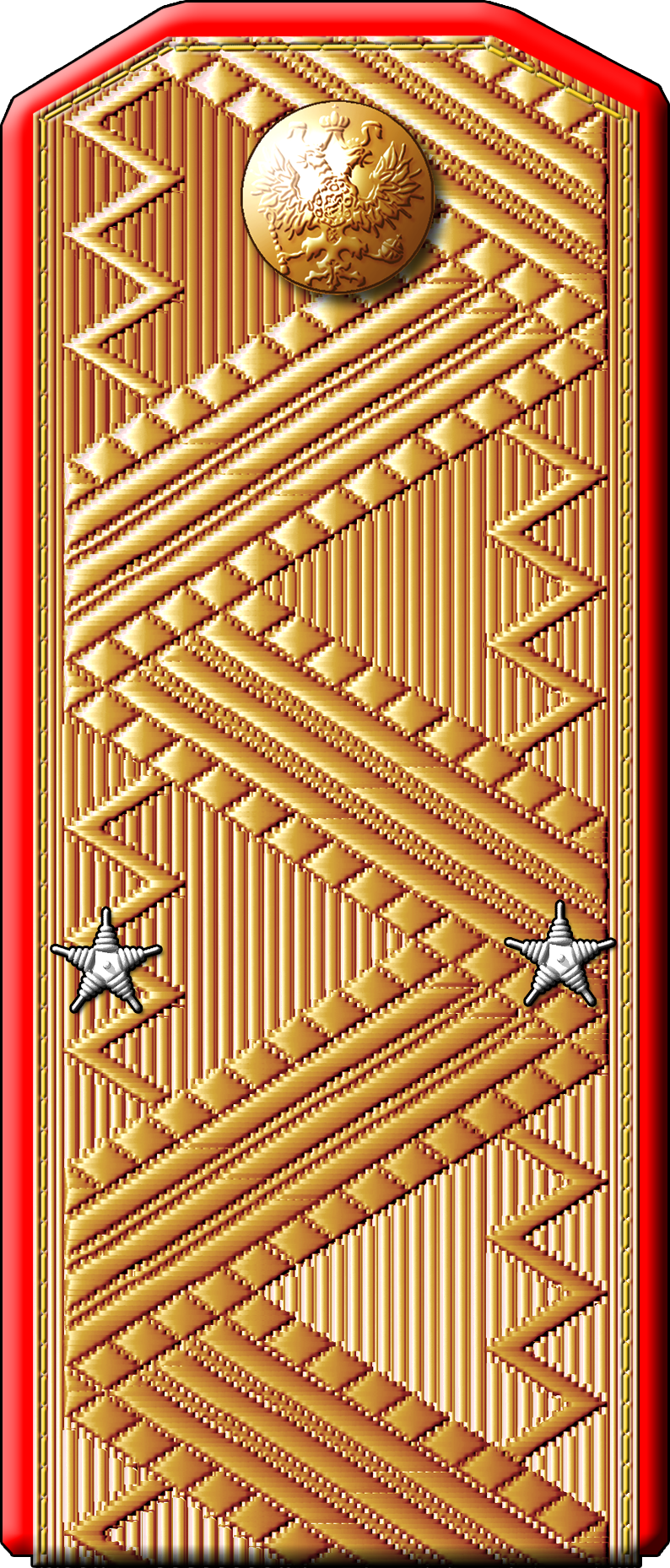
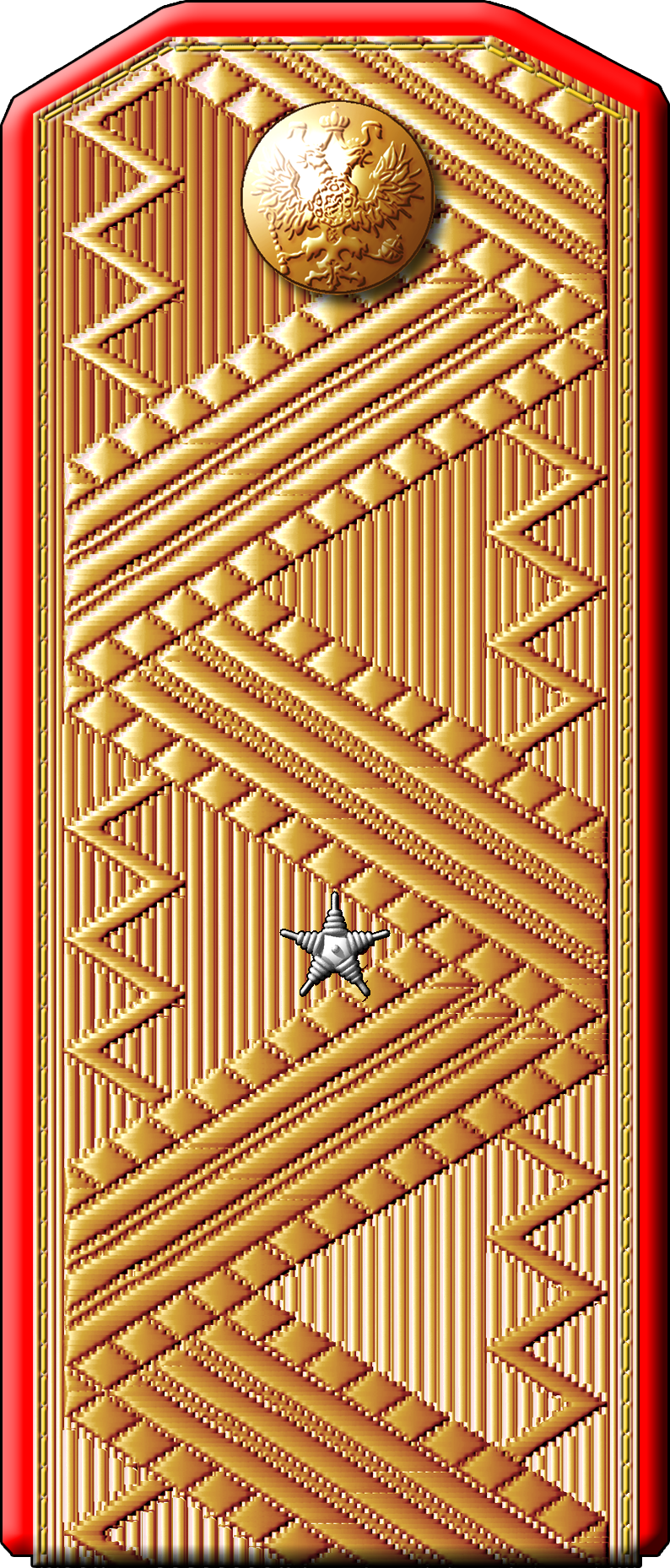
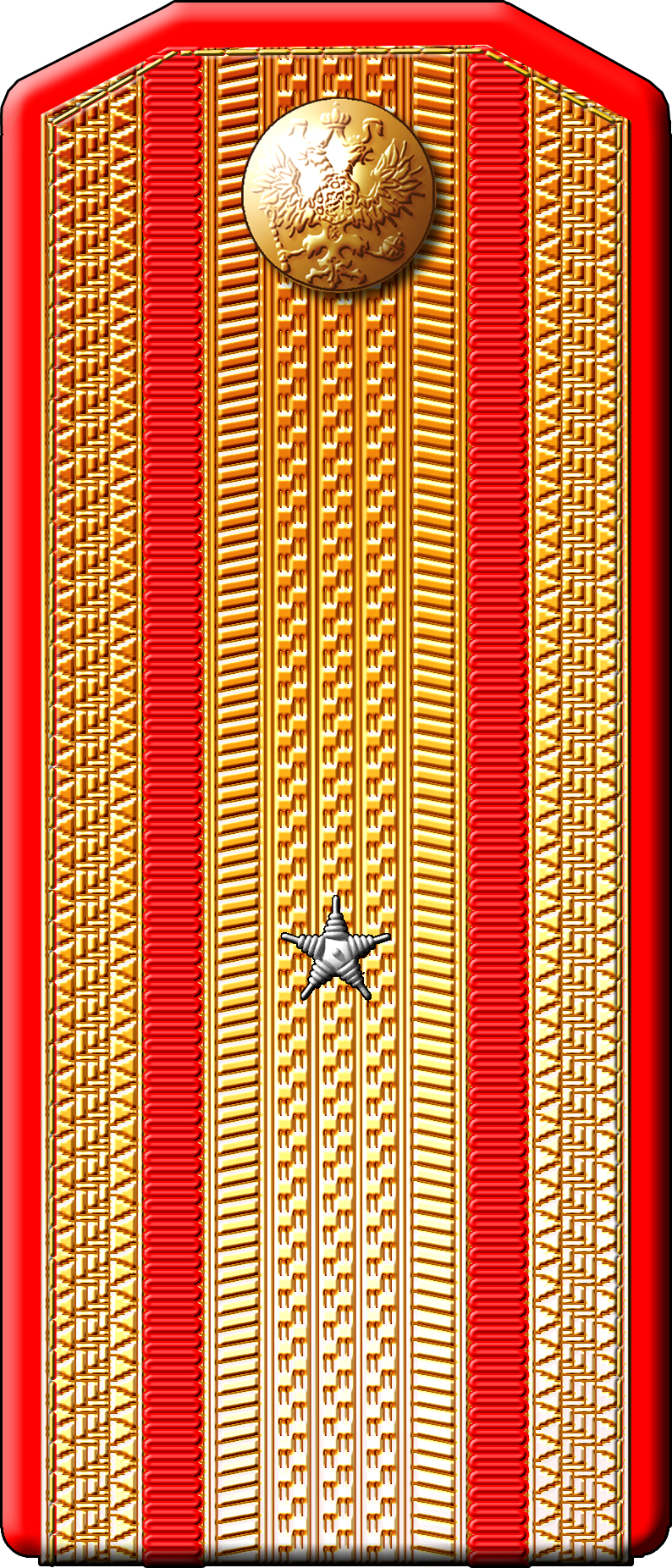
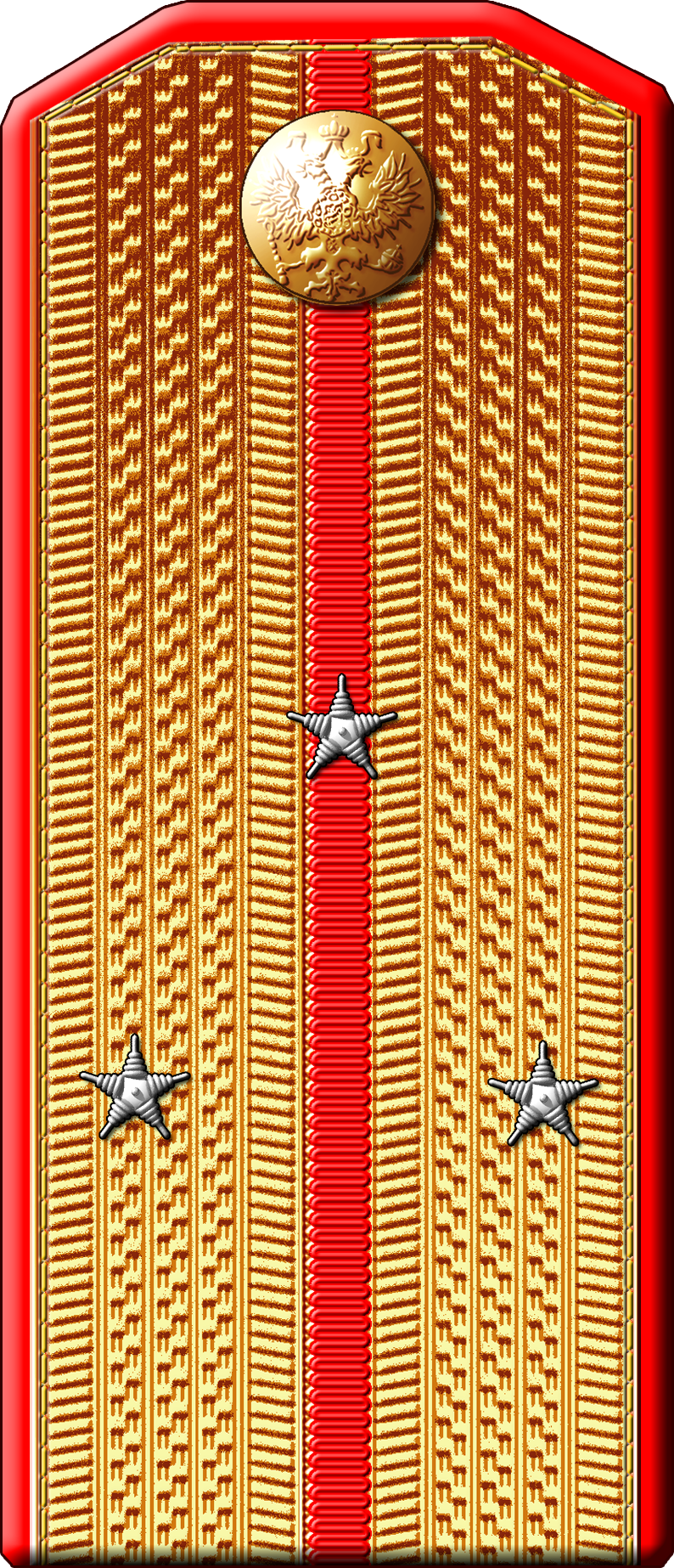
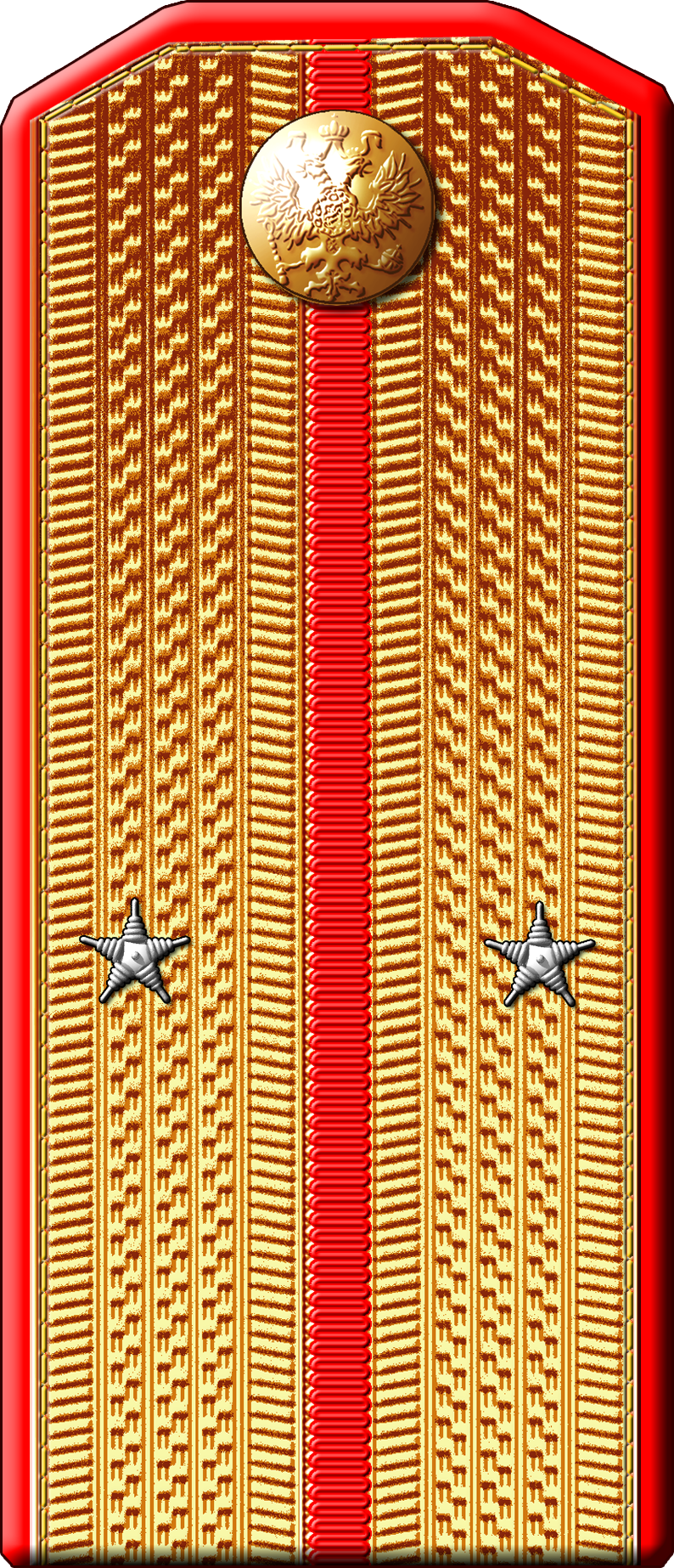
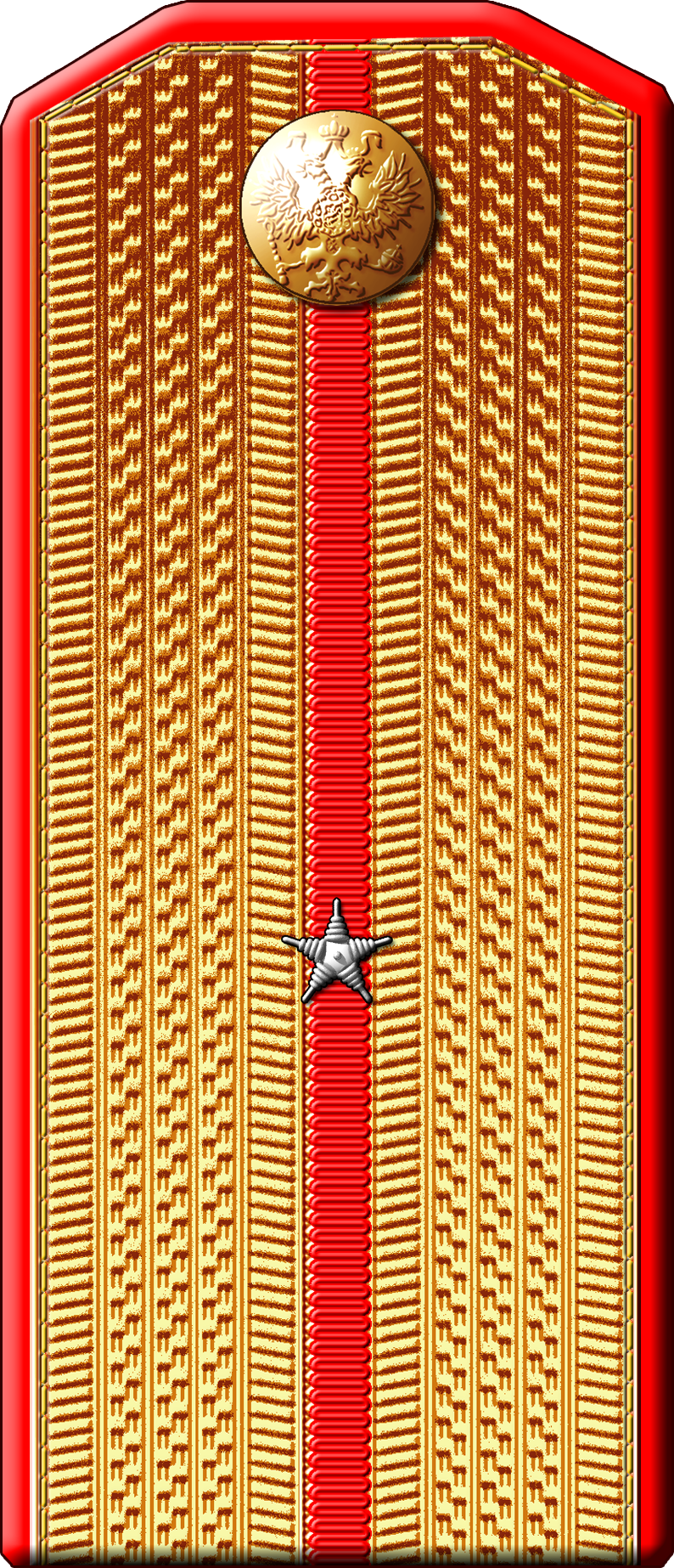
| Rank group | General / flag officers | | | | Senior officers | Junior officers |
|---|---|---|---|---|---|---|---|---|
| Army of the Kingdom of Montenegro |
| Army of the Kingdom of Montenegro | Vrhovni komandant | Glavni komandant | Divizjar | Brigadir | Komandir | Kapetan | Poručnik | Potporučnik |

=== Other ranks ===
The rank insignia of non-commissioned officers and enlisted personnel.

| Rank group | Ensigns | | | | NCOs | | Men |
|---|---|---|---|---|---|---|---|---|---|
| Army of the Kingdom of Montenegro |
| Army of the Kingdom of Montenegro | Alabarjaktar | Brigadni barjaktar | Bataljonski barjaktar | Cetni barjaktar | Vodnik | Desecar | Vojnik | Perjanik | Topnik |

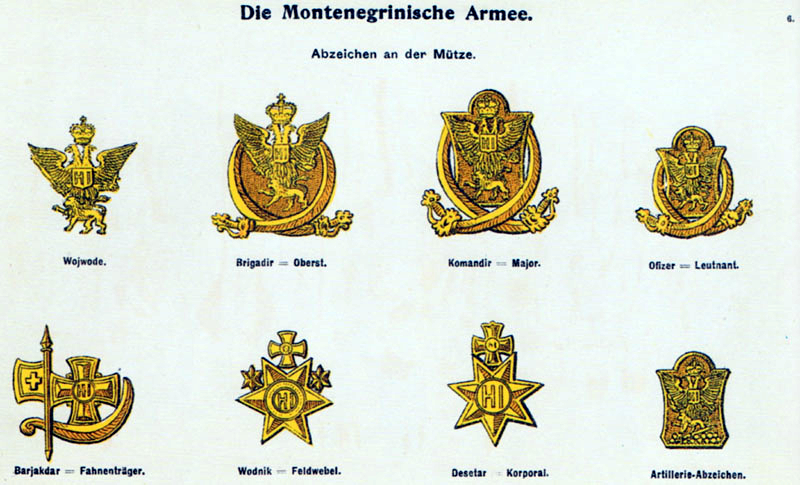
Cap Badges of Montenegro 1910-1912
