= Military ranks of Serbia =

The Military ranks of Serbia are the military insignia used by the current Serbian Armed Forces and historical Royal Serbian Army.

== Ranks of the Serbian Armed Forces ==
Note: Serbian River Flotilla is a brigade-level brown water naval branch of the Serbian Armed Forces, subordinated to the Serbian Army.

=== Officers ===
The rank insignia of commissioned officers.

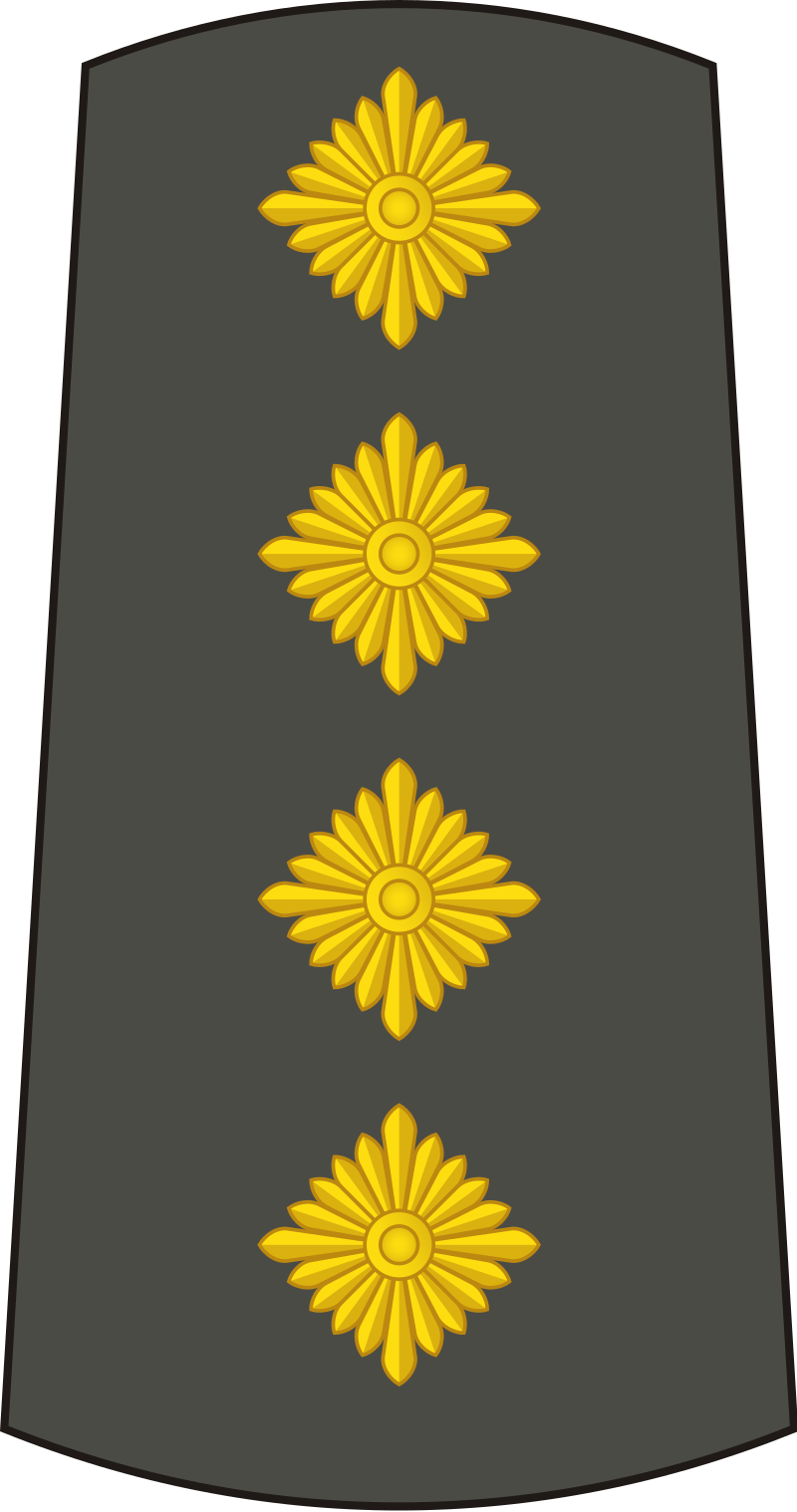
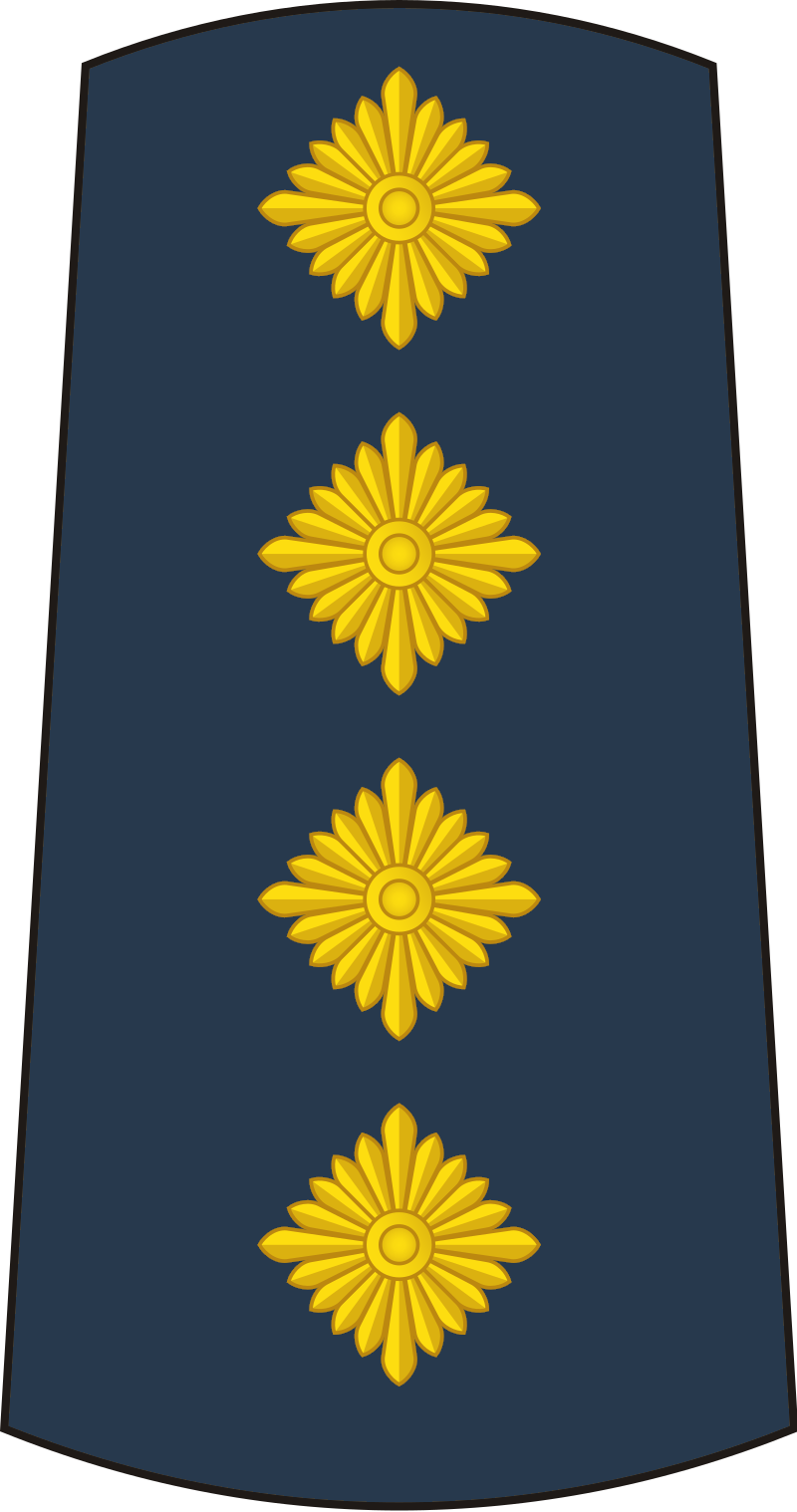
Rank group	General / flag officers				Senior officers			Junior officers
Serbian Army
Serbian Army	Генерал; General	Генерал-потпуковник; General-potpukovnik	Генерал-мајор; General-major	Бригадни генерал Brigadni general	Пуковник; Pukovnik	Потпуковник; Potpukovnik	Мајор; Major	Капетан прве класе Kapetan prve klase	Капетан; Kapetan	Поручник; Poručnik	Потпоручник; Potporučnik
Serbian River Flotilla
Serbian River Flotilla	Адмирал; Admiral	Вицеадмирал; Vitseadmiral	Контраадмирал; Kontraadmiral	Комодор; Komodor	Капетан бојног брода Kapetan bojnog broda	Капетан фрегате Kapetan fregate	Капетан корвете Kapetan korvete	Поручник бојног брода Poručnik bojnog broda	Поручник фрегате Poručnik fregate	Поручник корвете Poručnik korvete	Потпоручник; Potporučnik
Serbian Air Force and Air Defence
Serbian Air Force and Air Defence	Генерал; General	Генерал-потпуковник; General-potpukovnik	Генерал-мајор; General-major	Бригадни генерал Brigadni general	Пуковник; Pukovnik	Потпуковник; Potpukovnik	Мајор; Major	Капетан прве класе Kapetan prve klase	Капетан; Kapetan	Поручник; Poručnik	Потпоручник; Potporučnik
Rank group	General / flag officers				Senior officers			Junior officers

=== Enlisted ===
The rank insignia of non-commissioned officers and enlisted personnel.

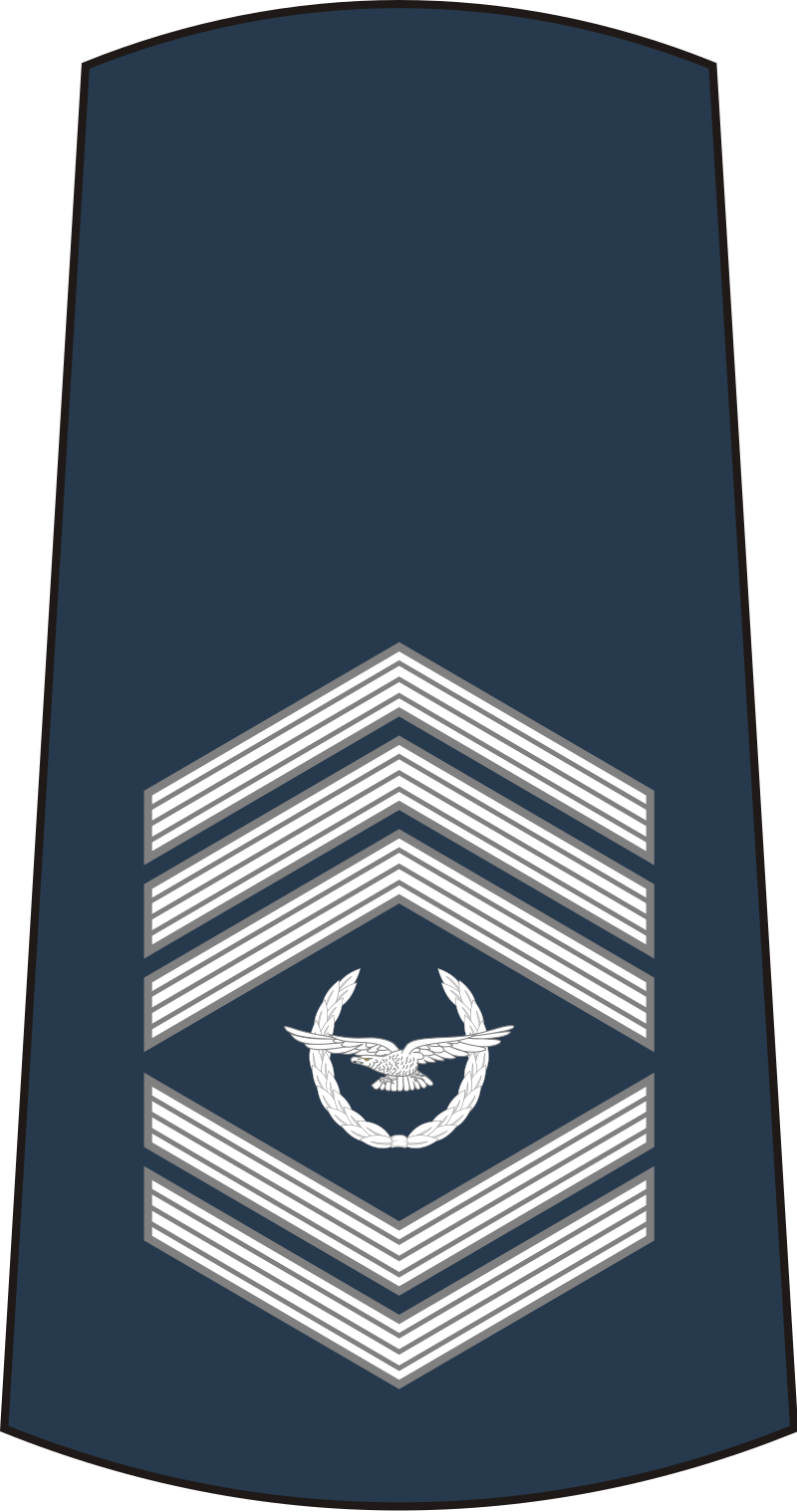
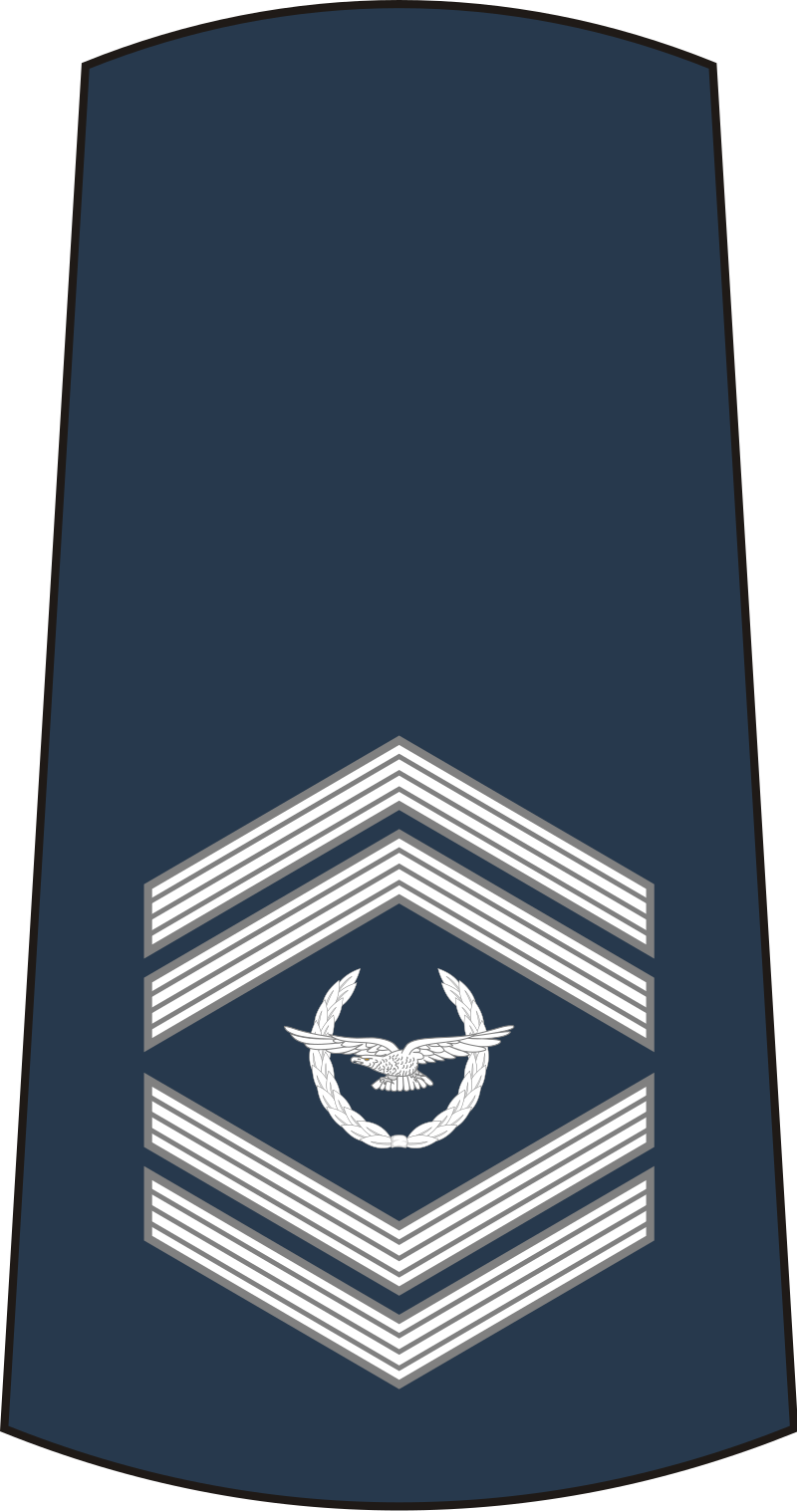
Rank group	Senior NCOs					Junior NCOs		Enlisted
Serbian Army
Serbian Army	Заставник I класе Zastavnik I klase	Заставник; Zastavnik	Старији Водник I класе Stariji Vodnik I klase	Старији Водник; Stariji Vodnik	Водник; Vodnik	Млађи водник Mlađi vodnik	Десетар; Desetar	Разводник; Razvodnik	Војник; Vojnik
Serbian River Flotilla
Serbian River Flotilla	Заставник I класе Zastavnik I klase	Заставник; Zastavnik	Старији Водник I класе Stariji Vodnik I klase	Старији Водник; Stariji Vodnik	Водник; Vodnik	Млађи водник Mlađi vodnik	Десетар; Desetar	Разводник; Razvodnik	Војник; Vojnik
Serbian Air Force and Air Defence
Serbian Air Force and Air Defence	Заставник I класе Zastavnik I klase	Заставник; Zastavnik	Старији Водник I класе Stariji Vodnik I klase	Старији Водник; Stariji Vodnik	Водник; Vodnik	Млађи водник Mlađi vodnik	Десетар; Desetar	Разводник; Razvodnik	Војник; Vojnik
Rank group	Senior NCOs					Junior NCOs		Enlisted

== Ranks of the Royal Serbian Army ==
Following the unification of the Kingdom of Serbia into Kingdom of Yugoslavia, the ranks were replaced with the military ranks of the Kingdom of Yugoslavia.

=== Officers ===
There were only three general ranks in Royal Serbian Army: General (from 1872), Army General (from 1900 to 1901) and Vojvoda (from 1901). There were only two types of shoulder cords: with double-headed eagle (from the coat of arms) for Vojvoda and without for all other General ranks. The different general grades were indicated by 6-pointed stars on the cuffs. Also the backing cloth for the shoulder cords was light blue for Army General (honorary rank from 1900 to 1901) and divisional generals and in a colour of service for brigadier general. During the Middle Ages, the Vojvoda was a military commander rank and a noble title. In the Balkan Wars and World War I this title was used to designate the highest military rank in the Royal Serbian Army (equivalent of the Field Marshal in other armies). This rank was introduced by the 1901 Law on the Organization of the Army and has been awarded only during the war for "special merits of top-ranking generals". The first Vojvoda was promoted by the Great Military Decree of the Kingdom of Serbia on 20 October 1912. Only four people ever officially held that military rank: Radomir Putnik (1912), Stepa Stepanović (1914), Živojin Mišić (1914) and Petar Bojović (1918).

The rank insignia of commissioned officers.

Rank group	General / flag officers		Senior officers			Junior officers
Royal Serbian Army
Royal Serbian Army	Војвода; Vojvoda	Ђенерал; Đeneral	Пуковник; Pukovnik	Потпуковник; Potpukovnik	Мајор; Major	Капетан I класе Kapetan I klase	Капетан II класе Kapetan II klase	Поручник; Poručnik	Потпоручник; Potporučnik	Заставник; Zastavnik

==== Student officer ranks ====
Rank group	Student officer
Royal Serbian Army
Royal Serbian Army	Питомац наредник Pitomac narednik	Питомац поднаредник Pitomac podnarednik	Питомац каплар Pitomac kaplar	Питомац; Pitomac

=== Enlisted ===
The rank insignia of non-commissioned officers and enlisted personnel.

Rank group	Non-commissioned officer			Enlisted
Royal Serbian Army
Royal Serbian Army	Наредник водник Narednik vodnik	Наредник; Narednik	Поднаредник; Podnarednik	Каплар; Kaplar	Редов; Redov

== Ranks of the Armed Forces of the Principality of Serbia ==
Ranks included general—pukovnik—potpukovnik—major—kapetan I–e klase—kapetan II–e klase—poručnik—četovođa—desetar—zastavnik—vodnik—dvajesnik—narednik—podnarednik—kaplar—dobošar—redov. Commanders were called komandant and aide-de-camps were ađutant.

== Ranks of the Revolutionary Serbian Army ==
Senior ranks were the kaplar ("corporal"), fendrek (from "fähnrich"), kapetan or buljubaša ("captain"), podvojvoda ("sub-warlord", vice-general) and vojvoda ("warlord", general), in the beginning of the First Serbian Uprising (1804–13). The ranks were initially given from within the army until the strengthening of central power when commander-in-chief Karađorđe with or without the Governing Council appointed them. At the end of the uprising, the officer ranks included kapetan, poručnik, potporučnik, praporčik, vahtmajstor (or narednik, from wachtmeister), estandarfirer (or barjaktar, "standard-bearer"), unteroficir (or podnarednik) and barabančik (or dobošar, "drummer").

== See also ==
- Military ranks of the Kingdom of Yugoslavia
- Military ranks of Socialist Yugoslavia
- Military ranks of Serbia and Montenegro

== Sources ==
- Vrhovna komanda Srpske Vojske (1879). Рат Србије са Турском за ослобођење и независност 1877-78. године. Državna štamparija.
- Bjelajac, Mile (2004). Generali i admirali Kraljevine Jugoslavije 1918—1941. Belgrade: Institut za novu istoriju Srbije. ISBN 86-7005-039-0.
- Bodrožić, Đuro (2022). "Vojska i država: počeci moderne srpske vojske". Nacionalni interes. 44 (2): 29–46.
- Milićević, Milić (2002). Reforma Vojske Srbije: 1897—1900. Beograd: Vojnoizdavački zavod. ISBN 86-335-0112-0.
