= Military ranks of the Independent State of Croatia =

The Ranks of the Independent State of Croatia Armed Forces are the ranks used by the Independent State of Croatia, it had similar insignia to those of the Armed Forces of Nazi Germany.

== Officers ==
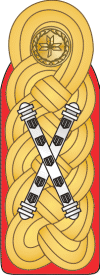
Rank group	General / flag officers				Senior officers			Junior officers
(Independent State of Croatia) Ustaše Militia
(Independent State of Croatia) Ustaše Militia				Krilnik	Pukovnik	Podpukovnik	Bojnik	Nadsatnik	Satnik	Natporučnik	Poručnik	Zastavnik
(Independent State of Croatia) Croatian Home Guard
(Independent State of Croatia) Croatian Home Guard	Vojskovodja	General pukovnik	General poručnik	General	Pukovnik	Podpukovnik	Bojnik	Nadsatnik	Satnik	Natporučnik	Poručnik	Zastavnik
Air Force of the Independent State of Croatia
Air Force of the Independent State of Croatia	Vojskovodja	General	Podmaršal	General bojnik	Pukovnik	Podpukovnik	Bojnik	Nadsatnik	Satnik	Natporučnik	Poručnik	Zastavnik
Croat Navy (1941–1942)
Croat Navy (1941–1942)			Admiral	Doadmiral	Kapetan bojnog broda	Kapetan fregate	Kapetan korvete		Poručnik bojnog broda	Poručnik fregate	Poručnik korvete	Pomorski zastavnik
Croat Navy (1942–1944)
Croat Navy (1942–1944)			Admiral	Komodor	Brodski pudkovnik	Brodski dopudkovnik	Brodski bojnik	Brodski nadsatnik	Brodski satnik	Brodski nadporučnik	Brodski poručnik	Brodski zastavnik
Croat Navy (1944–1944)
Croat Navy (1944–1944)			Admiral	Doadmiral	Kapetan bojnog broda	Kapetan fregate	Kapetan korvete	Nadporučnik bojnog broda	Poručnik bojnog broda	Poručnik fregate	Poručnik korvete	Pomorski zastavnik
Croat Navy (1944–1945)
Croat Navy (1944–1945)		Admiral	Vice-admiral	Kontra-admiral	Kapetan bojnog broda	Kapetan fregate	Kapetan korvete	Nadporučnik bojnog broda	Poručnik bojnog broda	Poručnik fregate	Poručnik korvete	Pomorski zastavnik
Croatian Armed Forces (1944-1945)
Croatian Armed Forces (1944-1945)		General pukovnik	General poručnik	General	Pukovnik	Podpukovnik	Bojnik	Nadsatnik	Satnik	Natporučnik	Poručnik	Zastavnik
Rank group	General / flag officers				Senior officers			Junior officers

=== Rank flags ===
Army				
Army	Vojskovodja	General pukovnik	General poručnik	General
Navy				
Navy		Admiral	Vice-admiral	Kontra-admiral

== Enlisted and NCOs ==
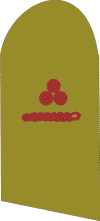
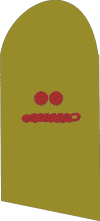
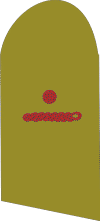
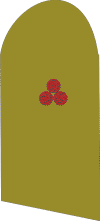
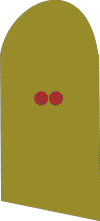
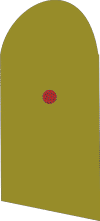
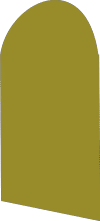
Rank group	Senior NCOs				Junior NCOs		Enlisted
(Independent State of Croatia) Ustaše Militia
(Independent State of Croatia) Ustaše Militia	Časnički namjesnik	Stožerni stražnik		Vodnik	Dovodnik	Rojnik	Dorojnik	Vojničar
(Independent State of Croatia) Croatian Home Guard
(Independent State of Croatia) Croatian Home Guard	Časnički namjesnik	Stožerni stražnik	Narednik	Vodnik		Razvodnik	Desetnik	Domobran
Croat Navy								No insignia
Croat Navy	Časnički namjesnik	Stožerni stražnik	Narednik	Vodnik		Razvodnik	Desetnik	Mornar
Air Force of the Independent State of Croatia
Air Force of the Independent State of Croatia	Časnički namjesnik	Stožerni Narednik	Narednik	Vodnik		Razvodnik	Desetnik	Zrakoplovac
Croatian Armed Forces (1944-1945)
Croatian Armed Forces (1944-1945)	Časnički namjesnik	Stožerni stražnik	Stražnik	Vodnik	Rojnik	Dorojnik	Strielac	Vojnik
Rank group	Senior NCOs				Junior NCOs		Enlisted
