= Military ranks of the Kingdom of Yugoslavia =

The Military ranks of the Kingdom of Yugoslavia were the military insignia used by the Royal Yugoslav Armed Forces. It replaced the ranks of the Kingdom of Serbia following the unification of the Kingdom of Serbia into Kingdom SHS (later Kingdom Yugoslavia). After the proclamation of the Socialist Federal Republic of Yugoslavia, the ranks were replaced by the Yugoslav People's Army ranks.

== Corps colours ==
| Colour | Branch | Prefix | Private | Notes |
|---|---|---|---|---|
| Steel Blue | General corps of the army | Serbian: Општа струка ђенералштаба, romanized: Opšta struka đeneralštaba Serbian: Општи род, romanized: Opšti rod | —N/a | Divisional general to Field Marshal. |
| Dark Red | Infantry | Serbian: Пешадија, romanized: Pešadija | Serbian: Редов, romanized: Redov | Private to Brigadier general. |
| Royal Blue | Cavalry corps | Serbian: Коњички, romanized: Konjički | Serbian: Коњаник, romanized: Konjanik | Private to Brigadier general. |
| Black | Artillery-technical corps | Serbian: Артиљеријско–технички, romanized: Artiljerijsko–tehnički; Serbian: Артиљеријски, romanized: Artiljerijski | Serbian: Артиљерац, romanized: Artiljerac | Private to Divisional general. |
| Red | General staff | Serbian: Ђенералштабни, romanized: Đeneralštabni | —N/a | Major to Divisional general. |
| Cherry Purple | Еngineering-technical corps | Serbian: Инжињерско-технички, romanized: Inžinjersko-tehnički; Serbian: Инжињерски, romanized: Inžinjerski; Serbian: Геодетски, romanized: Geodetski | —N/a | Sub–lieutenant to Divisional general. |
| Coffe Brown | Medical corps | Serbian: Санитетски, romanized: Sanitetski; Serbian: Болничарски, romanized: Bolničarski | Serbian: Болничар, romanized: Bolničar | Private to Divisional general. |
| Dark Red | Quartermaster corps | Serbian: Интендантски, romanized: Intendantski | —N/a | Sub–lieutenant to Divisional general. |
| Purple | Judge advocate general corps | Serbian: Судски, romanized: Sudski | —N/a | Sub–lieutenant to Divisional general. |
| Green | Administration and cadets | Serbian: Администртивни, romanized: Administrativni; Serbian: Питомачки, romanized: Pitomački | Serbian: Питомaц, romanized: Pitomac | Corporal to Colonel. |
| Blood Red | Gendarmerie | Serbian: Жандармеријски, romanized: Žandarmerijski | Serbian: Жандарм, romanized: Žandarm | Private to Brigadier general. |
| Light blue (sky) | Air Force (Note: Color abolished in 1937) | Serbian: Ваздухопловни, romanized: Vazduhoplovni | Serbian: Авијатичар, romanized: Avijatičar | Private to Army general. |

== Commissioned officer ranks ==
The rank insignia of commissioned officers.

| Rank group | General / flag officers | | | | Senior officers | | | Junior officers |
|---|---|---|---|---|---|---|---|---|---|---|---|
| Royal Yugoslav Army |
| Royal Yugoslav Army | Бојни војвода Bojni vojvoda | Армијски ђенерал Armijski đeneral | Дивизијски ђенерал Divizijski đeneral | Бригадни ђенерал Brigadni đeneral | Пуковник; Pukovnik | Потпуковник; Potpukovnik | Мајор; Major | Капетан прве класе Kapetan prve klase | Капетан друге класе Kapetan druge klase | Поручник; Poručnik | Потпоручник; Potporučnik |
| Royal Yugoslav Navy |
| Royal Yugoslav Navy | | Адмирал; Admiral | Вице адмирал Vice admiral | Контра адмирал Kontra admiral | Капетан бојног брода Kapetan bojnog broda | Капетан фрегате Kapetan fregate | Капетан корвете Kapetan korvete | Поручник бојног брода прве класе Poručnik bojnog broda prve klase | Поручник бојног брода друге класе Poručnik bojnog broda druge klase | Поручник фрегате Poručnik fregate | Поручник корвете Poručnik korvete |
| Royal Yugoslav Air Force |
| Royal Yugoslav Air Force | | Армијски ђенерал Armijski đeneral | Дивизијски ђенерал Divizijski đeneral | Бригадни ђенерал Brigadni đeneral | Пуковник; Pukovnik | Потпуковник; Potpukovnik | Мајор; Major | Капетан прве класе Kapetan prve klase | Капетан друге класе Kapetan druge klase | Поручник; Poručnik | Потпоручник; Potporučnik |
| (Kingdom of Yugoslavia) Royal Yugoslav Gendarmerie |
| (Kingdom of Yugoslavia) Royal Yugoslav Gendarmerie | | | | Жандармеријски бригадни ђенерал Žandarmerijski brigadni đeneral | Жандармеријски пуковник Žandarmerijski pukovnik | Жандармеријски потпуковник Žandarmerijski potpukovnik | Жандармеријски мајор Žandarmerijski major | Жандармеријски капетан прве класе Žandarmerijski kapetan prve klase | Жандармеријски капетан друге класе Žandarmerijski kapetan druge klase | Жандармеријски поручник Žandarmerijski poručnik | Жандармеријски потпоручник Žandarmerijski potporučnik |
| Rank group | General / flag officers | | | | Senior officers | | | Junior officers |

=== Former insignia ===
| Rank group | Abolished insignia |
|---|---|
| Rank |
| Rank | Адмирал; Admiral |
| Established | 11 January 1924 |
| Abolished | 6 September 1929 |

=== Rank flags ===
| Rank group | General/flag officers |
|---|---|---|---|---|
| Royal Yugoslav Army |
| Royal Yugoslav Army | Бојни Војвода; Bojni Vojvoda | Армијски ђенерал Armijski đeneral | Дивизијски ђенерал Divizijski đeneral | Бригадни ђенерал Brigadni đeneral |
| Royal Yugoslav Navy |
| Royal Yugoslav Navy | | Адмирал; Admiral | Вице адмирал Vice admiral | Контра адмирал Kontra admiral |

== Other ranks ==
The rank insignia of non-commissioned officers and enlisted personnel.

| Rank group | Senior NCOs | | | Junior NCOs | | Enlisted |
|---|---|---|---|---|---|---|---|
| Royal Yugoslav Army |
| Royal Yugoslav Army | Наредник-водник I класе Narednik-vodnik I klase | Наредник-водник II класе Narednik-vodnik II klase | Наредник-Водник III класе Narednik-vodnik III klase | Наредник; Narednik | Поднаредник; Podnarednik | Каплар; Kaplar | Редов; Redov |
| Royal Yugoslav Navy |
| Royal Yugoslav Navy | Морнарички вођа I класе Mornarički vođa I klase | Морнарички вођа II класе Mornarički vođa II klase | Морнарички вођа III класе Mornarički vođa III klase | Морнарички наредник Mornarički narednik | Морнарички поднаредник Mornarički podnarednik | Морнар прве класе Mornar prve klase | Морнар; Mornar |
| (Kingdom of Yugoslavia) Royal Yugoslav Air Force |
| (Kingdom of Yugoslavia) Royal Yugoslav Air Force | Ваздухопловни вођа I класе Vazduhoplovni vođa I klase | Ваздухопловни вођа II класе Vazduhoplovni vođa II klase | Ваздухопловни вођа III класе Vazduhoplovni vođa III klase | Ваздухопловни наредник Vazduhoplovni narednik | Ваздухопловни поднаредник Vazduhoplovni podnarednik | Ваздухопловни каплар Vazduhoplovni kaplar | Авијатичар; Avijatičar |
| (Kingdom of Yugoslavia) Royal Yugoslav Gendarmerie |
| (Kingdom of Yugoslavia) Royal Yugoslav Gendarmerie | Жандармеријски наредник-водник I класе Žandarmerijski narednik-vodnik I klase | Жандармеријски наредник-водник II класе Žandarmerijski narednik-vodnik II klase | Жандармеријски наредник-водник III класе Žandarmerijski narednik-vodnik III klase | Жандармеријски наредник Žandarmerijski narednik | Жандармеријски поднаредник Žandarmerijski podnarednik | Жандармеријски каплар Žandarmerijski kaplar | Жандарм; Žandarm |
| Rank group | Senior NCOs | | | Junior NCOs | | Enlisted |

== See also ==
- Military ranks of Serbia
- Military ranks of Socialist Yugoslavia
- Military ranks of Serbia and Montenegro
