= Comparative navy officer ranks of Hispanophone countries =

Rank comparison chart of officers for navies of Hispanophone states.

== Officers ==
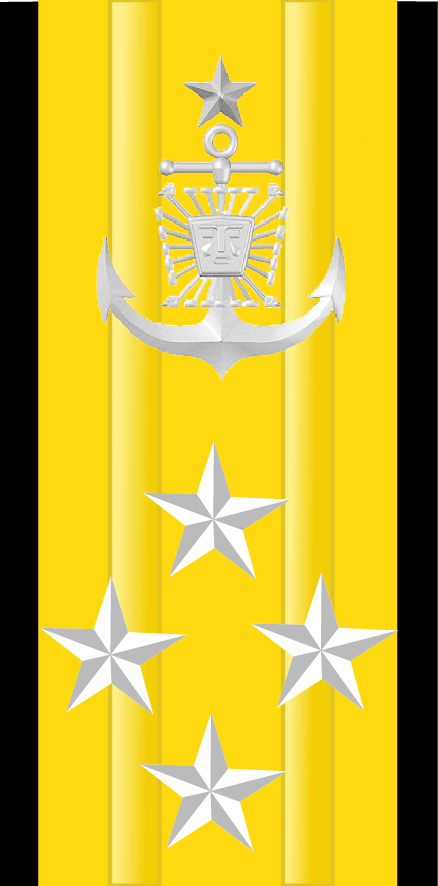
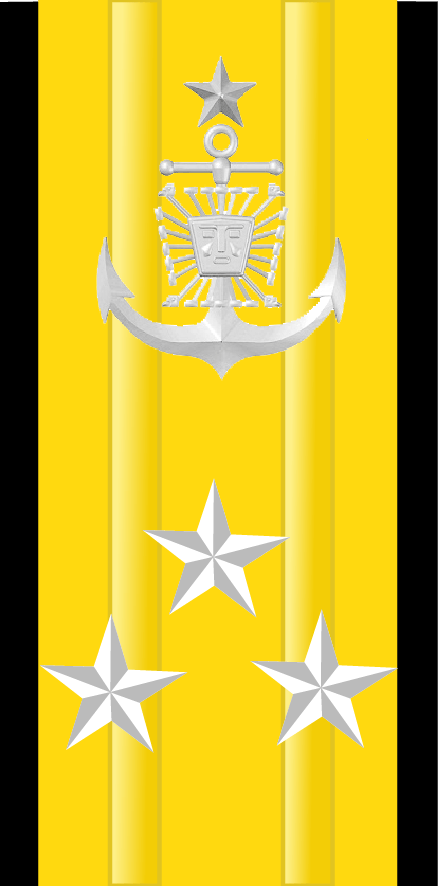
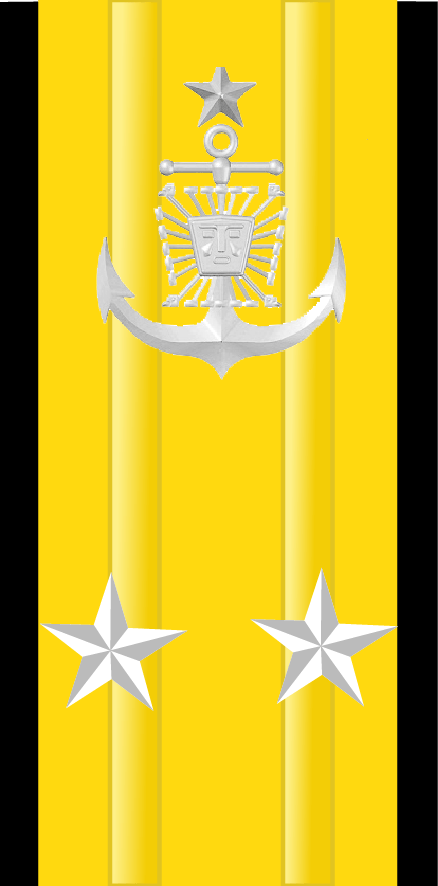
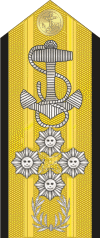
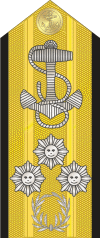
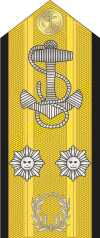
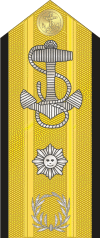
Rank group	General / flag officers					Senior officers				Junior officers
Argentine Navy
Argentine Navy		Almirante	Vicealmirante	Contralmirante	Comodoro de marina	Capitán de navío		Capitán de fragata	Capitán de corbeta	Teniente de navío		Teniente de fragata	Teniente de corbeta	Guardiamarina
Bolivian Navy
Bolivian Navy		Almirante	Vicealmirante	Contraalmirante		Capitán de navío		Capitán de fragata	Capitán de corbeta	Teniente de navío		Teniente de fragata		Alférez
Chilean Navy
Chilean Navy		Almirante	Vicealmirante	Contraalmirante	Comodoro	Capitán de navío		Capitán de fragata	Capitán de corbeta	Teniente 1°		Teniente 2°	Subteniente	Guardiamarina
Colombian National Navy
Colombian National Navy		Almirante		Vicealmirante	Contralmirante	Capitán de navío		Capitán de fragata	Capitán de corbeta	Teniente de navío		Teniente de fragata		Teniente de corbeta
Costa Rica	No navy
Cuban Revolutionary Navy
Cuban Revolutionary Navy			Almirante	Vicealmirante	Contralmirante	Capitán de flotilla	Capitán de navío	Capitán de fragata	Capitán de corbeta	Teniente de navío		Teniente de fragata	Teniente de corbeta	Alférez
Dominican Navy
Dominican Navy			Almirante	Vicealmirante	Contralmirante	Capitán de navío		Capitán de fragata	Capitán de corbeta	Teniente de navio		Teniente de fragata		Teniente de corbeta
Ecuadorian Navy
Ecuadorian Navy		Almirante	Vicealmirante	Contralmirante		Capitán de navío		Capitán de fragata	Capitán de corbeta	Teniente de navío		Teniente de fragata		Alferez de fragata
Navy of El Salvador
Navy of El Salvador		Almirante	Vicealmirante	Contralmirante	Comodoro	Capitán de navío		Capitán de fragata	Capitán de corbeta	Teniente de navío		Teniente de fragata		Teniente de corbeta
Navy of Equatorial Guinea
Navy of Equatorial Guinea				Vice almirante	Contra almirante	Capitán de navío		Capitán de fragata	Capitán de corbeta	Teniente de navío		Alférez de navío		Alférez de fragata
Guatemalan Navy
Guatemalan Navy				Almirante	Vicealmirante	Capitán de navío		Capitán de fragata	Capitán de corbeta	Teniente de navio	Teniente de fragata	Alférez de navio		Alférez de fragata
Honduran Navy
Honduran Navy				Vicealmirante	Contralmirante	Capitán de navío		Capitán de fragata	Capitán de corbeta	Teniente de navío		Teniente de fragata		Alferez de fragata
Rank group	General / flag officers					Senior officers				Junior officers
Mexican Navy
Mexican Navy		Secretario de Marina	Almirante	Vicealmirante	Contraalmirante	Capitán de navío		Capitán de fragata	Capitán de corbeta	Teniente de navio	Teniente de fragata	Teniente de corbeta		Guardiamarina
Nicaraguan Navy
Nicaraguan Navy			Almirante	Vicealmirante	Contralmirante	Capitán de navío		Capitán de fragata	Capitán de corbeta	Teniente de navío		Teniente de fragata	Teniente de corbeta	Alferez de fragata
Panama	No navy
Paraguayan Navy
Paraguayan Navy		Almirante	Vicealmirante	Contraalmirante		Capitán de navío		Capitán de fragata	Capitán de corbeta	Teniente de navio		Teniente de fragata	Teniente de corbeta	Guardiamarina
Peruvian Navy
Peruvian Navy	Gran Almirante del Perú	Almirante	Vicealmirante	Contraalmirante		Capitán de navío		Capitán de fragata	Capitán de corbeta	Teniente primero		Teniente segundo		Alférez de fragata
Spanish Navy
Spanish Navy	Capitán general	Almirante general	Almirante	Vicealmirante	Contralmirante	Capitán de navío		Capitán de fragata	Capitán de corbeta	Teniente de navío		Alférez de navío		Alférez de fragata
National Navy of Uruguay
National Navy of Uruguay		Almirante		Contraalmirante		Capitán de navío		Capitán de fragata	Capitán de corbeta	Teniente de navío		Alférez de navio	Alférez de fragata	Guardiamarina
Bolivarian Navy of Venezuela
Bolivarian Navy of Venezuela		Almirante en jefe	Almirante	Vicealmirante	Contraalmirante	Capitán de navío		Capitán de fragata	Capitán de corbeta	Teniente de navío		Teniente de fragata		Alferez de navío
Rank group	General / flag officers					Senior officers				Junior officers

== See also ==
- Comparative navy officer ranks of the Americas
- Ranks and insignia of NATO navies officers
