= Military ranks of Socialist Yugoslavia =

The Military ranks of Socialist Yugoslavia are the military insignia used by the Yugoslav People's Army.

== Ranks (1945–1946) ==
=== Officers ===
The rank insignia of commissioned officers.

Rank group	General / flag officers				Senior officers			Junior officers
(Socialist Federal Republic of Yugoslavia) Yugoslav Army
(Socialist Federal Republic of Yugoslavia) Yugoslav Army	Maršal Jugoslavije (Note: Marshal of Yugoslavia was an highest military distinction of the Supreme Commander of Armed Forces and not a military rank. The first and the only one was given to Josip Broz Tito, who (beside the title of Maršal and Supreme Commander), also held the lifelong function of the President of the Socialist Federal Republic of Yugoslavia and the leader of the Communist Party of Yugoslavia.)	General-pukovnik	General-lajtant	General-major	Pukovnik	Potpukovnik	Major	Kapetan	Poručnik	Potporučnik	Zastavnik
Rank group	General / flag officers				Senior officers			Junior officers

=== Other ranks ===
The rank insignia of non-commissioned officers and enlisted personnel.

Rank group	Senior NCOs		Junior NCOs		Enlisted
(Socialist Federal Republic of Yugoslavia) Yugoslav Army					No insignia
(Socialist Federal Republic of Yugoslavia) Yugoslav Army	Stariji vodnik	Vodnik	Mlađi vodnik	Desetar	Borac
Rank group	Senior NCOs		Junior NCOs		Enlisted

== Ranks (1946–1953) ==
=== Officers ===
The rank insignia of commissioned officers.

Between 1946 and 1953, the shoulder board rank insignia for junior officers of the Yugoslav Armed Forces underwent two major revisions:

1946-1948

-Zastavnik: no stars

-Potporučnik: 1 star

-Poručnik: 2 stars

-Kapetan: 3 stars

1948-1952

In 1948, the number of stars on the shoulder boards were changed, and they were as follows:

-Zastavnik: 1 star

-Potporučnik: 2 stars

-Poručnik: 3 stars

-Kapetan: 4 stars

1952-1953

On April 6, 1952, the rank of Kapetan prve klase was introduced, and the rank of Zastavnik was abolished, leading to the number of stars being changed again:

-Potporučnik: 1 star

-Poručnik: 2 stars

-Kapetan: 3 stars

-Kapetan prve klase: 4 stars

The rank of Zastavnik was reintroduced as the seniormost NCO rank in 1953.

Rank group	General / flag officers					Senior officers			Junior officers
(Socialist Federal Republic of Yugoslavia) Yugoslav Ground Forces
(Socialist Federal Republic of Yugoslavia) Yugoslav Ground Forces	Maršal Jugoslavije	General armije	General-pukovnik	General-lajtnant (Note: Renamed in 1952 as General-potpukovnik.)	General-major	Pukovnik	Potpukovnik	Major	Kapetan prve klase (Note: Established 1952.)	Kapetan	Poručnik	Potporučnik	Zastavnik (Note: Abolished 1952 as Junior officer and moved to Senior NCO in 1953.)
Yugoslav Navy
1946–1952	Maršal Jugoslavije		Admiral	Viceadmiral	Kontraadmiral	Kapetan I ranga	Kapetan II ranga	Kapetan III ranga	—	Poručnik I ranga	Poručnik II ranga	Poručnik III ranga	Zastavnik
1952–1953	Maršal Jugoslavije		Admiral	Viceadmiral	Kontraadmiral	Kapetan bojnog broda	Kapetan Fregate	Kapetan korvete	Poručnik bojnog broda	Poručnik fregate	Poručnik korvete	Potporučnik	—
(Socialist Federal Republic of Yugoslavia) Yugoslav Air Force
(Socialist Federal Republic of Yugoslavia) Yugoslav Air Force	Maršal Jugoslavije		General-pukovnik	General-lajtnant	General-major	Pukovnik	Potpukovnik	Major	Kapetan prve klase	Kapetan	Poručnik	Potporučnik	Zastavnik
(Socialist Federal Republic of Yugoslavia) People's Defence Corps of Yugoslavia
(Socialist Federal Republic of Yugoslavia) People's Defence Corps of Yugoslavia				General-lajtnant	General-major	Pukovnik	Potpukovnik	Major	Kapetan prve klase	Kapetan	Poručnik	Potporučnik	Zastavnik
Rank group	General / flag officers					Senior officers			Junior officers

=== Other ranks ===
The rank insignia of non-commissioned officers and enlisted personnel.

Rank group	Senior NCOs		Junior NCOs		Enlisted
(Socialist Federal Republic of Yugoslavia) Yugoslav Ground Forces
(Socialist Federal Republic of Yugoslavia) Yugoslav Ground Forces	Stariji vodnik	Vodnik	Mlađi vodnik	Desetar	Vojnik
Yugoslav Navy
Yugoslav Navy	Stariji vodnik	Vodnik	Mlađi vodnik	Desetar	Mornar
(Socialist Federal Republic of Yugoslavia) Yugoslav Air Force
(Socialist Federal Republic of Yugoslavia) Yugoslav Air Force	Stariji vodnik	Vodnik	Mlađi vodnik	Desetar	Vojnik
(Socialist Federal Republic of Yugoslavia) People's Defence Corps of Yugoslavia
(Socialist Federal Republic of Yugoslavia) People's Defence Corps of Yugoslavia	Stariji vodnik	Vodnik	Mlađi vodnik	Desetar	Vojnik
Rank group	Senior NCOs		Junior NCOs		Enlisted

== Ranks (1953–1982) ==
This table shows the rank structure in use by Yugoslav People's Army from 1953 to 1982.

=== Officers ===
The rank insignia of commissioned officers.

Rank group	General / flag officers						Senior officers			Junior officers
(Socialist Federal Republic of Yugoslavia) Yugoslav Ground Forces
(Socialist Federal Republic of Yugoslavia) Yugoslav Ground Forces	Maršal Jugoslavije	General (Note: General was highest military rank for deputy supreme commander. Established 1955 and abolished 1974. Ivan Gošnjak, while serving as a defence minister and deputy supreme commander of SFRY, was considered for promotion to this rank. No officers were promoted to this rank.)	General armije	General-pukovnik	General-potpukovnik	General-major	Pukovnik	Potpukovnik	Major	Kapetan prve klase	Kapetan	Poručnik	Potporučnik
Yugoslav Navy
Yugoslav Navy	Maršal Jugoslavije		Admiral flote (Note: Established 1955.)	Admiral	Viceadmiral	Kontraadmiral	Kapetan bojnog broda	Kapetan Fregate	Kapetan korvete	Poručnik bojnog broda	Poručnik fregate	Poručnik korvete	Potporučnik
(Socialist Federal Republic of Yugoslavia) Yugoslav Air Force
(Socialist Federal Republic of Yugoslavia) Yugoslav Air Force	Maršal Jugoslavije			General-pukovnik	General-potpukovnik	General-major	Pukovnik	Potpukovnik	Major	Kapetan prve klase	Kapetan	Poručnik	Potporučnik
Rank group	General / flag officers						Senior officers			Junior officers

=== Other ranks ===
The rank insignia of non-commissioned officers and enlisted personnel.

Rank group	NCOs						Enlisted
(Socialist Federal Republic of Yugoslavia) Yugoslav Ground Forces
(Socialist Federal Republic of Yugoslavia) Yugoslav Ground Forces	Zastavnik I klase	Zastavnik	Stariji vodnik I klase	Stariji vodnik	Vodnik I klase	Vodnik	Mlađi vodnik	Desetar	Razvodnik	Vojnik
Yugoslav Navy
Yugoslav Navy	Zastavnik I klase	Zastavnik	Stariji vodnik I klase	Stariji vodnik	Vodnik I klase	Vodnik	Mlađi vodnik	Desetar	Razvodnik	Mornar
(Socialist Federal Republic of Yugoslavia) Yugoslav Air Force
(Socialist Federal Republic of Yugoslavia) Yugoslav Air Force	Zastavnik I klase	Zastavnik	Stariji vodnik I klase	Stariji vodnik	Vodnik I klase	Vodnik	Mlađi vodnik	Desetar	Razvodnik	Vojnik
Rank group	NCOs						Enlisted

== Ranks (1982–1992) ==
=== Officers ===
The rank insignia of commissioned officers.

Rank group	General / flag officers				Senior officers			Junior officers
Yugoslav Ground Forces
Yugoslav Ground Forces	General armije	General-pukovnik	General-potpukovnik	General-major	Pukovnik	Potpukovnik	Major	Kapetan 1. klase	Kapetan	Poručnik	Potporučnik
Yugoslav Navy
Yugoslav Navy	Admiral flote	Admiral	Vice admiral	Kontraadmiral	Kapetan bojnog broda	Kapetan fregate	Kapetan korvete	Poručnik bojnog broda	Poručnik fregate	Poručnik korvete	Potporučnik
Yugoslav Air Force
Yugoslav Air Force	General armije (Note: Established 1982. No officers were promoted to this rank.)	General-pukovnik	General-potpukovnik	General-major	Pukovnik	Potpukovnik	Major	Kapetan 1. klase	Kapetan	Poručnik	Potporučnik
Rank group	General / flag officers				Senior officers			Junior officers

=== Other ranks ===
The rank insignia of non-commissioned officers and enlisted personnel.

Rank group	NCOs						Enlisted
(Socialist Federal Republic of Yugoslavia) Yugoslav Ground Forces
(Socialist Federal Republic of Yugoslavia) Yugoslav Ground Forces	Zastavnik I klase	Zastavnik	Stariji vodnik I klase	Stariji vodnik	Vodnik I klase	Vodnik	Mlađi vodnik	Desetar	Razvodnik	Vojnik
Yugoslav Navy
Yugoslav Navy	Zastavnik I klase	Zastavnik	Stariji vodnik I klase	Stariji vodnik	Vodnik I klase	Vodnik	Mlađi vodnik	Desetar	Razvodnik	Mornar
(Socialist Federal Republic of Yugoslavia) Yugoslav Air Force
(Socialist Federal Republic of Yugoslavia) Yugoslav Air Force	Zastavnik I klase	Zastavnik	Stariji vodnik I klase	Stariji vodnik	Vodnik I klase	Vodnik	Mlađi vodnik	Desetar	Razvodnik	Vojnik
Rank group	NCOs						Enlisted

In 1988, wartime insignia for Members of the Presidency were instituted (effective January 1st, 1989) for wear in their collective capacity as supreme commander-in-chief, but were never used.

Rank group	Supreme Command
(Socialist Federal Republic of Yugoslavia) Yugoslav People's Army
(Socialist Federal Republic of Yugoslavia) Yugoslav People's Army	Članovi Predsedništva

== See also ==
- Military ranks of Serbia and Montenegro
- Military ranks of Serbia
- Croatian military ranks
- Military ranks and insignia of Bosnia and Herzegovina
