= Military ranks of Serbia and Montenegro =

Ranks and insignia of the Military of Serbia and Montenegro were the military insignia used by the Armed Forces of Serbia and Montenegro. The Military of Serbia and Montenegro used the same military ranks insignia as Yugoslav People's Army, with some ranks abolished. The same ranks and insignia system was used both before and after the constitutional reforms of 2003, before which the military held the name "Military of Yugoslavia". When the union of Serbia and Montenegro was dissolved, the two new armies created new systems of ranks and insignia.

== Cap Badges ==
Category	Ground Forces	Air Force and Air Defense	Navy
Generals/Admirals			
Officers			
NCOs			
Soldiers			

Special Forces
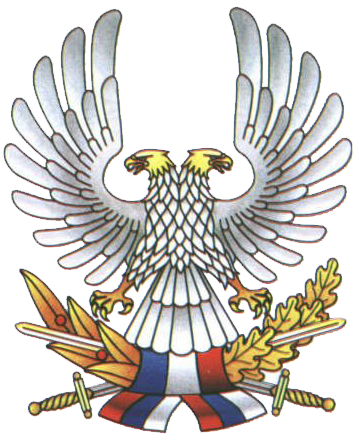

== Officers ==
The rank insignia of commissioned officers.

In the navy rank was shown by a number of gold stripes of varying widths, worn on the cuff. Broader stripes indicated a higher rank. All officers wore a five pointed gold star above the stripes.

Rank group	General / flag officers				Senior officers			Junior officers
Ground Forces of Serbia and Montenegro
Ground Forces of Serbia and Montenegro	Генерал армије General armije	Генерал-пуковник; General-pukovnik	Генерал-потпуковник; General-potpukovnik	Генерал-мајор; General-major	Пуковник; Pukovnik	Потпуковник; Potpukovnik	Мајор; Major	Капетан прве класе Kapetan 1. klase	Капетан; Kapetan	Поручник; Poručnik	Потпоручник; Potporučnik
Navy of Serbia and Montenegro
Navy of Serbia and Montenegro	Адмирал флоте Admiral flote	Адмирал; Admiral	Вицеадмирал; Vitseadmiral	Контраадмирал; Kontraadmiral	Капетан бојног брода Kapetan bojnog broda	Капетан фрегате Kapetan fregate	Капетан корвете Kapetan korvete	Поручник бојног брода Poručnik bojnog broda	Поручник фрегате Poručnik fregate	Поручник корвете Poručnik korvete	Потпоручник; Potporučnik
Air Force of Serbia and Montenegro
Air Force of Serbia and Montenegro	Генерал армије General armije	Генерал-пуковник; General-pukovnik	Генерал-потпуковник; General-potpukovnik	Генерал-мајор; General-major	Пуковник; Pukovnik	Потпуковник; Potpukovnik	Мајор; Major	Капетан прве класе Kapetan 1. klase	Капетан; Kapetan	Поручник; Poručnik	Потпоручник; Potporučnik
Rank group	General / flag officers				Senior officers			Junior officers

== Other ranks ==
The rank insignia of non-commissioned officers and enlisted personnel.

Rank group	Senior NCOs						Junior NCOs		Enlisted
Ground Forces of Serbia and Montenegro
Ground Forces of Serbia and Montenegro	Заставник прве класе Zastavnik 1. klase	Заставник; Zastavnik	Старији водник прве класе Stariji vodnik 1. klase	Старији водник Stariji vodnik	Водник прве класе Vodnik 1. klase	Водник; Vodnik	Млађи водник Mlađi vodnik	Десетар; Desetar	Разводник; Razvodnik	Војник; Vojnik
Navy of Serbia and Montenegro
Navy of Serbia and Montenegro	Заставник прве класе Zastavnik 1. klase	Заставник; Zastavnik	Старији водник прве класе Stariji vodnik 1. klase	Старији водник Stariji vodnik	Водник прве класе Vodnik 1. klase	Водник; Vodnik	Млађи водник Mlađi vodnik	Десетар; Desetar	Разводник; Razvodnik	Саилор; Mornar
Air Force of Serbia and Montenegro
Air Force of Serbia and Montenegro	Заставник прве класе Zastavnik 1. klase	Заставник; Zastavnik	Старији водник прве класе Stariji vodnik 1. klase	Старији водник Stariji vodnik	Водник прве класе Vodnik 1. klase	Водник; Vodnik	Млађи водник Mlađi vodnik	Десетар; Desetar	Разводник; Razvodnik	Војник; Vojnik
Rank group	Senior NCOs						Junior NCOs		Enlisted

== See also ==
- Military ranks of Serbia
- Military ranks of Montenegro
- Military ranks of Socialist Yugoslavia
