= Military ranks of the Polish People's Republic =

The Military ranks of the Polish People's Republic were the military insignia used by the Polish People's Army.

== Army ==
=== Officer timeline ===
Rank group	General / flag officers					Senior officers			Junior officers
1943-1949
1943-1949	Marszałek Polski		Generał broni	Generał dywizji	Generał brygady	Pułkownik	Podpułkownik	Major	Kapitan	Porucznik	Podporucznik	Chorąży
1949-1952
1949-1952	Marszałek Polski		Generał broni	Generał dywizji	Generał brygady	Pułkownik	Podpułkownik	Major	Kapitan	Porucznik	Podporucznik
1952-1960
1952-1960	Marszałek Polski	Generał armii	Generał broni	Generał dywizji	Generał brygady	Pułkownik	Podpułkownik	Major	Kapitan	Porucznik	Podporucznik	Chorąży
1960-1963
1960-1963	Marszałek Polski		Generał broni	Generał dywizji	Generał brygady	Pułkownik	Podpułkownik	Major	Kapitan	Porucznik	Podporucznik	Chorąży
1963-1967
1963-1967	Marszałek Polski		Generał broni	Generał dywizji	Generał brygady	Pułkownik	Podpułkownik	Major	Kapitan	Porucznik	Podporucznik
1967-1989
1967-1989	Marszałek Polski	Generał armii	Generał broni	Generał dywizji	Generał brygady	Pułkownik	Podpułkownik	Major	Kapitan	Porucznik	Podporucznik
Rank group	General / flag officers					Senior officers			Junior officers

=== Enlisted timeline ===
Rank group	Senior NCOs									Junior NCOs			Enlisted
1943-1963
1943-1963								Starszy sierżant	Sierżant	Plutonowy	Kapral		Starszy szeregowy	Szeregowy
1963-1967
1963-1967			Starszy chorąży	Chorąży				Starszy sierżant	Sierżant	Plutonowy	Kapral		Starszy szeregowy	Szeregowy
1967-1989
1967-1989	Starszy chorąży sztabowy	Chorąży sztabowy	Starszy chorąży	Chorąży	Młodszy chorąży	Starszy sierżant sztabowy	Sierżant sztabowy	Starszy sierżant	Sierżant	Plutonowy	Starszy kapral	Kapral	Starszy szeregowy	Szeregowy

== Air and Air Defence Force ==
=== Officer timeline ===
Rank group	General / flag officers			Senior officers			Junior officers
1961-1989
1961-1989	Generał broni	Generał dywizji	Generał brygady	Pułkownik	Podpułkownik	Major	Kapitan	Porucznik	Podporucznik
Rank group	General / flag officers			Senior officers			Junior officers

=== Enlisted timeline ===
Rank group	Senior NCOs									Junior NCOs			Enlisted
1961-1963
1961-1963							Starszy sierżant		Sierżant	Plutonowy		Kapral	Starszy szeregowy	Szeregowy
1963-1970
1963-1970	Starszy chorąży			Chorąży			Starszy sierżant		Sierżant	Plutonowy		Kapral	Starszy szeregowy	Szeregowy
1970-1989
1970-1989	Starszy chorąży sztabowy	Chorąży sztabowy	Starszy chorąży	Chorąży	Młodszy chorąży	Starszy sierżant sztabowy	Sierżant sztabowy	Starszy sierżant	Sierżant	Plutonowy	Starszy kapral	Kapral	Starszy szeregowy	Szeregowy

== Navy ==
=== Officer timeline ===
Rank group	General / flag officers			Senior officers			Junior officers
1943-1952
1943-1952	Admirał	Wiceadmirał	Kontradmirał	Komandor	Komandor porucznik	Komandor podporucznik	Kapitan marynarki	Porucznik marynarki	Podporucznik marynarki
1952-1963
1952-1963	Admirał	Wiceadmirał	Kontradmirał	Komandor	Komandor porucznik	Komandor podporucznik	Kapitan marynarki	Porucznik marynarki	Podporucznik marynarki	Chorąży marynarki
1964-1989
1964-1989	Admirał	Wiceadmirał	Kontradmirał	Komandor	Komandor porucznik	Komandor podporucznik	Kapitan marynarki	Porucznik marynarki	Podporucznik marynarki

=== Enlisted timeline ===
Rank group	Senior NCOs									Junior NCOs			Enlisted
1943-1963														No insignia
1943-1963								Starszy bosman	Bosman	Bosmanmat	Mat		Starszy marynarz	Marynarz
1963-1967														No insignia
1963-1967			Starszy chorąży marynarki	Chorąży marynarki				Starszy bosman	Bosman	Bosmanmat	Mat		Starszy marynarz	Marynarz
1967-1989														No insignia
1967-1989	Starszy chorąży sztabowy marynarki	Сhorąży sztabowy marynarki	Starszy chorąży marynarki	Chorąży marynarki	Młodszy chorąży marynarki	Starszy bosman sztabowy	Bosman sztabowy	Starszy bosman	Bosman	Bosmanmat	Starszy mat	Mat	Starszy marynarz	Marynarz
