= Military ranks of Yugoslavia =

Military ranks of Yugoslavia could refer to:

- Military ranks of the Kingdom of Yugoslavia (1918–1941)
- Yugoslav People's Army ranks (1945–1992)
- Military ranks of Serbia and Montenegro (1992–2006), known as "Military of Yugoslavia" until 2003
