= Montenegrin Ground Army =

- Kopnena vojska Crne Gore
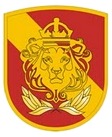
- Emblem of the Montenegrin Ground Army
- Active: 1879–1918; 2006–present
- Country: Montenegro
- Type: Ground army
- Role: Ground warfare
- Size: 1,500
- Part of: Armed Forces of Montenegro

Commanders
- Commander: Colonel Dragutin Dakić

Insignia
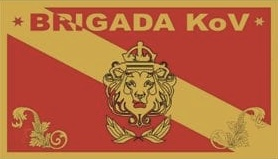
- Ensign

Montenegrin Ground Army (Montenegrin: Kopnena vojska Crne Gore) is the ground force of the Armed Forces of Montenegro.

== Montenegrin Army ==
The fundamental role and purpose of the Montenegrin Army is to protect vital national interests of Montenegro and defend the sovereignty and territorial integrity of the state.

== Ranks ==
=== Commissioned officer ranks ===
The rank insignia of commissioned officers.

NATO code	OF-10	OF-9	OF-8	OF-7	OF-6	OF-5	OF-4	OF-3	OF-2	OF-1
Montenegrin Ground Army
Montenegrin Ground Army		General pukovnik	General potpukovnik	General major	Brigadir general	Pukovnik	Potpukovnik	Major	Kapetan	Poručnik	Potporučnik

=== Other ranks ===
The rank insignia of non-commissioned officers and enlisted personnel.

NATO code	OR-9	OR-8	OR-7	OR-6	OR-5	OR-4	OR-3	OR-2	OR-1
Montenegrin Ground Army
Montenegrin Ground Army	Zastavnik 1 klase	Zastavnik	Stariji vodnik 1 klase	Stariji vodnik	Vodnik 1 klase	Vodnik	Mlađi vodnik	Desetar	Razvodnik
