= Bootsmannsmaat =

Non-commissioned officer rank in the navy

Bootsmannsmaat (transl. boatswain's mate) was, in the Austro-Hungarian Navy (1786-1918), an enlisted rank and, in the Imperial German Navy, a non-commissioned officer (NCO) rank.

== Austria-Hungary ==
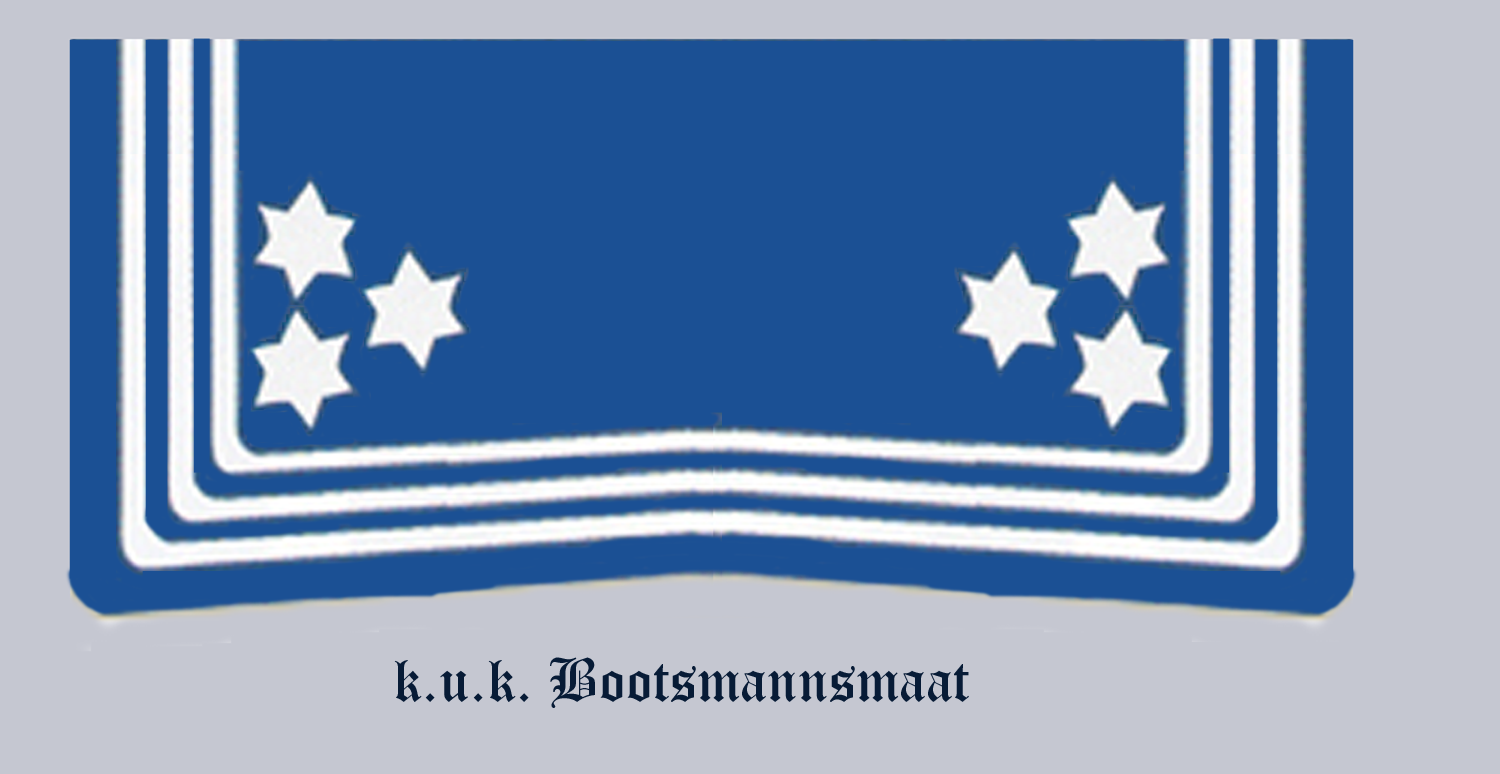
K.u.k. BtsmMaat rank insignia, collar, sailor suit.

Bootsmannsmaat was in the k.u.k. Austro-Hungarian Navy (1786 until 1918) equivalent to the rank Corporal of the k.u.k. Common Army. The sequence of ranks was as follows:

- Rudergast - OR3 (en: Helmsman)
- Bootsmannsmaat - OR4 (en: boatswain's mate)

== Germany ==
Bootsmannsmaat Boatswain's mate
- Collar tabs

- Sleeve insignia
- Country: Nazi Germany
- Service branch: Kriegsmarine
- Abbreviation: BtsmMaat
- Formation: 1933
- Abolished: 1945
- Next higher rank: Oberbootsmannmaat
- Next lower rank: Oberstabsgefreiter
- Equivalent ranks: Unteroffizier; Leading rate (UK); Petty officer third class (U.S.)

The Bootsmannsmaat was equivalent to the rank of Unteroffizier in Heer und Luftwaffe.

Regarding the particular career or assignment the sequence of ranks (both of them OR5 / second mates) and the grade description was established as follows:

- for Maate (en: mates) – Bootsmannsmaat (en: boatswain's mate), Feuerwerksmaat (en: firework's mate), Maschinistenmaat (en: engineman's mate), or Steuermannsmaat (en: steersman's mate)
- for Obermaate (en: senior mates) – Oberbootsmannsmaat (en: senior boatswain's mate), Oberfeuerwerksmaat (en: senior firework's mate), Obermaschinistenmaat (en: senior enginemen's mate), or Obersteuermannsmaat (en: senior steersman's mate)

== Russian Empire ==
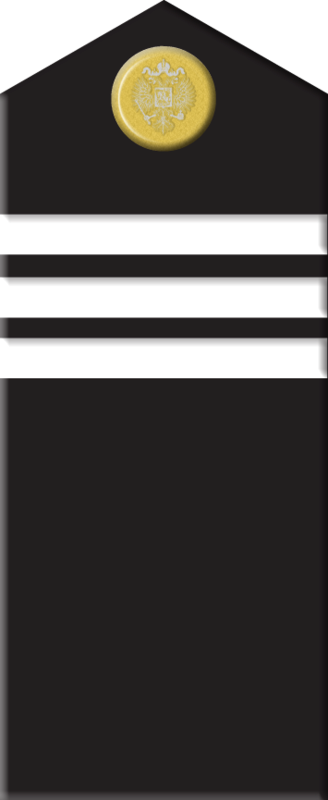
Shoulder board BtsmMaat RIN until 1917

Similar to the naming in German speaking naval forces, in the Imperial Russian Navy (IRN) of the Russian Empire there was the rank Bootsmannsmaat (original Russian: боцманмат / botsmanmat) as well. However, it was an OR6-rank equivalent to the Senior unteroffizier (ru: «старший унтерофицер» (ОR6)). The sequence of ranks was as follows:

- Quartiermeister - OR4 (en: Quartermaster / ru:квартирмейстер)
- Bootsmannsmaat - OR6 (en: boatswain's mate /ru: боцманмат)
- Bootsmann - OR7 (en: Boatswain / ru: боцман)
- Gardemarin - OR8 (en: Guard marine / ru: гардемарин)
