= Lieutenant colonel general =

Military rank used in a number of Balkan armed forces

Countries which use Lieutenant colonel general

Lieutenant colonel general (Serbo-Croatian: генерал-потпуковник, general-potpukovnik, lit. 'general sub-colonel') is a general officer rank in a number of armed forces in the countries of the Balkans. The rank can be traced back the ranks used by the Yugoslav People's Army, and continues to be used in a number of former Yugoslav countries following the breakup of Yugoslavia.

The rank of lieutenant colonel general represents a rationalisation of the situation in some armies of a lieutenant general outranking a major general, when a major outranks a lieutenant.

== Lieutenant colonel general's insignia ==
=== Army ===
General Potpukovnik
(Montenegrin Ground Army)

Генерал потполковник
General potpolkovnik
(North Macedonian Ground Forces)

Генерал-потпуковник
General-potpukovnik
(Serbian Army)

Generalpodpolkovnik
(Slovenian Ground Force)

=== Air force ===
General Potpukovnik
(Montenegrin Air Force)

Генерал потполковник
General potpolkovnik
(North Macedonia Air Brigade)

Генерал-Потпуковник
General-Potpukovnik
(Serbian Air Force)

Generalpodpolkovnik
(Slovenian Air Force)

== See also ==
- Lieutenant (Eastern Europe)
- Lieutenant colonel (Eastern Europe)
- Colonel (Eastern Europe)
- Colonel general
