= Podporuchik =

Officer rank in some Slavic armed forces

Countries which use Podporuchik

Podporuchik (Russian: подпору́чик, lit. 'sub-poruchik', Czech: podporučík, Slovak: podporučík), podporuchnik (Polish: podporucznik) or potporuchnik (Serbo-Croatian: потпоручник, potporučnik, Macedonian: потпоручник) is the most junior officer rank in some Slavic armed forces, and is placed below the rank of lieutenant, typically corresponding to rank of second lieutenant in English-speaking countries.

== Russia ==
The rank was introduced first by Peter the Great in 1703 as an officer rank of the so-called ober-officer rank group. It belonged to rank class XIII (infantry), class XII (artillery, and engineer troops), and class X (guards) until 1884. In line with the military reforms in 1884, podpraporshik became in peace time. However, in the guards and the cossacks armed forces Cornet and Chorąży remained the lowest officer rank.

The equivalent to podporuchik was Michman in the Imperial Russian Navy, and governmental secretary (Russian: губернский секретарь, romanized: gubernsky sekretar) in the civil administration.

== Serbia ==
The rank of potporučnik was adopted by the Revolutionary Serbian Army at the end of the First Serbian Uprising (1804–13), alongside poručnik and others.

It was the second lowest commissioned officer rank in the Royal Serbian Army (1882–1918).

It is today the lowest commissioned officer rank in the Serbian Armed Forces.

== Poland ==
In Poland, the rank of Podporucznik (lit. 'sub-lieutenant'; abbreviated "ppor.") is the lowest officer rank used within the Polish Army. It is roughly equivalent to the military rank of the Second lieutenant in the armed forces of English-speaking countries.

Graduates of military schools are awarded the rank of podporucznik by the office of the President of Poland upon the request of the Ministry of National Defence (Poland). The rank may also awarded by the way of a promotion provided certain conditions.

The rank of podporucznik also exists in the Border Guard, Prison Service, the State Protection Service, Foreign Intelligence Agency, Military Intelligence Service, the Military Counterintelligence Service, the Internal Security Agency, and in the Polish Navy.

Variants

- Prison Service: Podporucznik Służby Więziennej (lit. 'Sub-lieutenant of the Prison Service')
- Navy: Podporucznik marynarki (lit. 'Sub-lieutenant of the Navy')

== Possible rank sequence ==
A possible sequence of ranks (ascending) might be as follows:

- Podporuchik (sub / junior poruchik / lieutenant)
- Poruchik (lieutenant)
- Nadporuchik (senior poruchik / lieutenant)
- Kapitan (captain)

== Podporuchik insignia ==
=== Army ===
Podporučnik
(Bosnian Ground Forces)

Потпоручник
Potporučnik
(North Macedonia Ground Forces)

Potporučnik
(Montenegrin Ground Army)

Podporucznik
(Polish Land Forces)

Потпоручник
Potporučnik
(Serbian Army)

=== Navy ===
Podporucznik marynarki
(Polish Navy)

Потпоручник
Potporučnik
(Serbian River Flotilla)

== See also ==
- Lieutenant (Eastern Europe)
- Lieutenant colonel (Eastern Europe)
- Colonel (Eastern Europe)
- Lieutenant colonel general
- Comparative army officer ranks of Europe
- Ranks and insignia of the Russian armed forces until 1917

== Sources ==
- Bodrožić, Đuro (2022). "Vojska i država: počeci moderne srpske vojske". Nacionalni interes. 44 (2): 29–46.
