= Lieutenant (Eastern Europe) =

Military rank in Slavophone armed forces

Countries which use the term

The rank of poruchik (Russian: поручик; Czech: poručík; Slovak: poručík) or poruchnik (Serbo-Croatian: поручник, poručnik; Polish: porucznik; Slovene: poročnik; Ukrainian: поручник, poručnyk), translated to lieutenant, is used in Slavophone armed forces, depending on the country being either the lowest or second lowest officer rank.

== Etymology ==
The rank designation poruchik might be derived from Russian: поpученец, lit. 'a person tasked by a special mission'; Russian: поручение, lit. 'assignment', 'commission' or Russian: поручить, lit. 'task to look after', 'charge with something'. Normally the poruchik received military orders in written form and was responsible to meet the particular goals and objectives anticipated.

== Russia ==
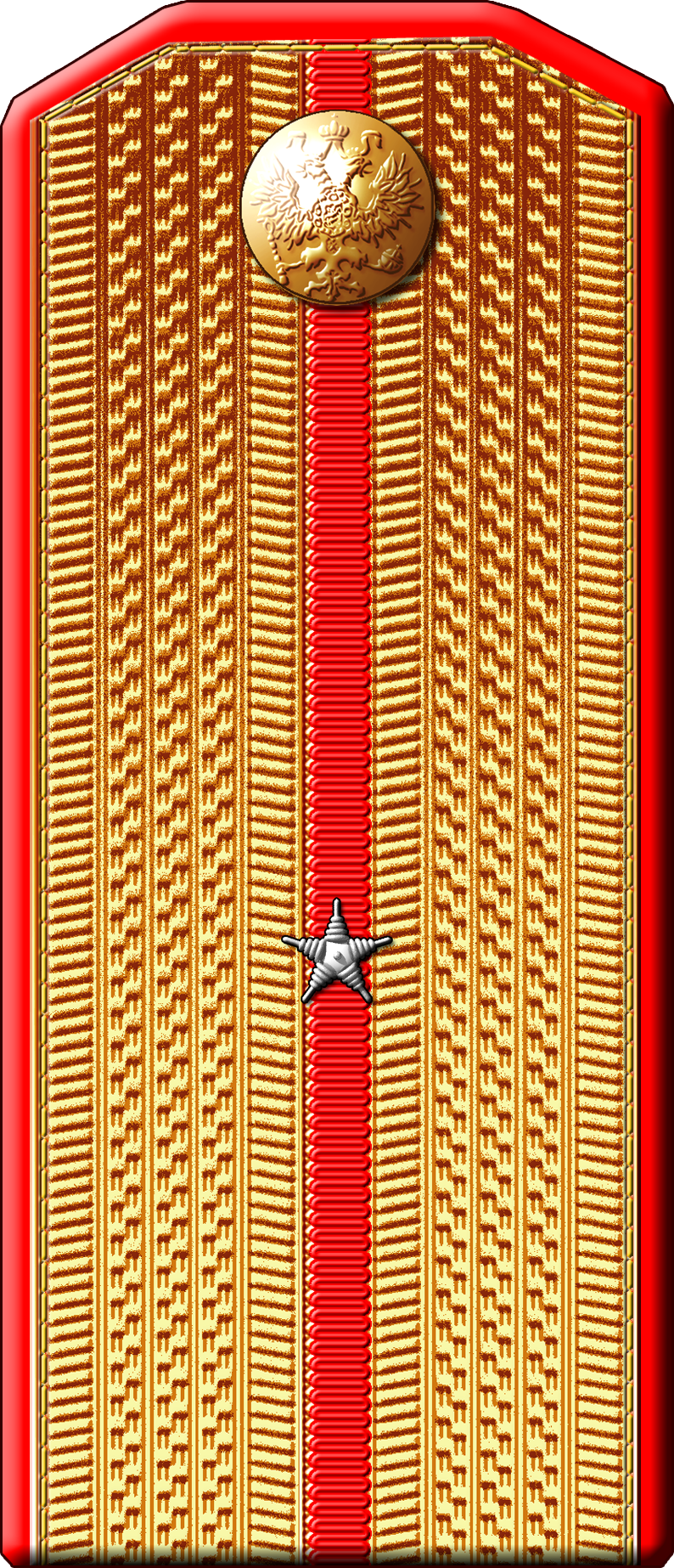
Lieutenant insignia used by the Imperial Russian Army.

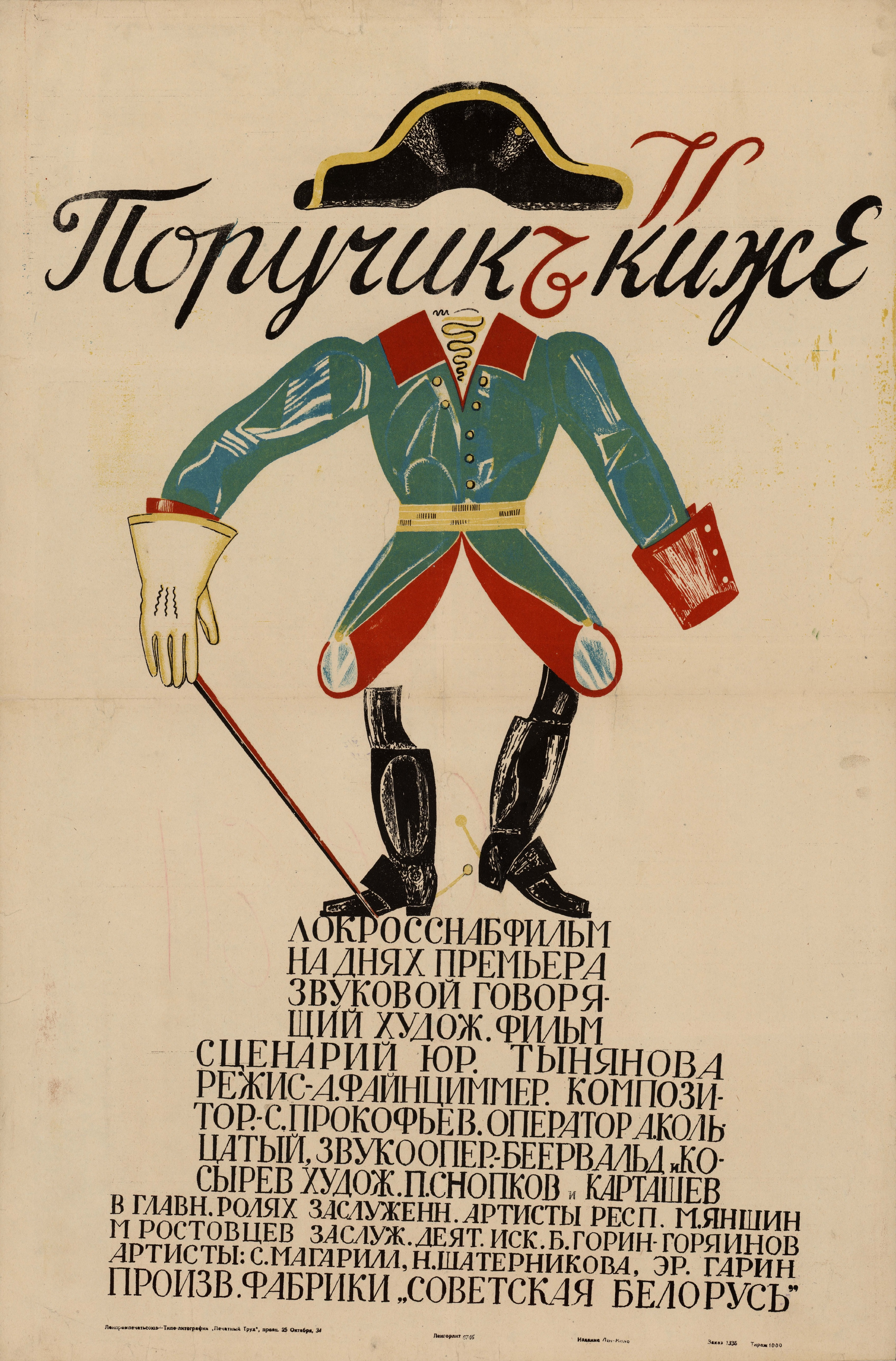
Poster for the film Lieutenant (Poruchik) Kijé

The Imperial Russian Army introduced this rank first in middle of the 17th century, by the Strelets so-called New Order Regiments, reflected in the Table of Ranks. A poruchik was normally assigned to assistant commanding officer of a company, later platoon. In 1798 this particular rank designation was replaced by lieutenant beginning with the Russian Guards, followed by other military units, and legalised by the Table of Ranks.

In 1933–34, Sergei Prokofiev composed the suite Poruchik Kizhe, known to English and French speakers as Lieutenant Kijé.

== Serbia ==
The rank of poručnik was adopted by the Revolutionary Serbian Army at the end of the First Serbian Uprising (1804–13), alongside potporučnik and others.

It was the third lowest commissioned officer rank in the Royal Serbian Army (1882–1918).

It is today the second lowest commissioned officer rank in the Serbian Armed Forces.

== Insignia ==
Poručnik
(Bosnian Ground Forces)

Poručnik
(Croatian Army)

Poručík
(Czech Land Forces)

Поручник
Poručnik
(North Macedonia Ground Forces)

Poručnik
(Montenegrin Ground Army)

Porucznik
(Polish Land Forces)

Поручник
Poručnik
(Serbian Army)

Poručík
(Slovak Ground Forces)

Poročnik
(Slovenian Ground Force)

== See also ==
- Podporuchik
- Lieutenant
- Lieutenant colonel (Eastern Europe)
- Colonel (Eastern Europe)
- Lieutenant colonel general
- Comparative army officer ranks of Europe
- Ranks and insignia of the Russian armed forces until 1917

== Sources ==
- Bodrožić, Đuro (2022). "Vojska i država: počeci moderne srpske vojske". Nacionalni interes. 44 (2): 29–46.
