= Corvette lieutenant =

Naval rank

- Common types of insignia
- Country: See gallery
- Service branch: Navies
- Rank group: Junior officer
- NATO rank code: OF-1
- Next higher rank: Frigate lieutenant
- Equivalent ranks: Ensign (Anglophone)

Corvette lieutenant is a rank in some navies, especially those of Spain and Latin America, roughly equivalent to a Royal Navy acting sub-lieutenant or a US Navy ensign.

== Corvette lieutenants' insignia ==
Tenente-de-corveta
(Angolan Navy)

Teniente de corbeta
(Argentine Navy)

Teniente de corbeta
(Colombian National Navy)

Poručnik korvete
(Croatian Navy)

Teniente de corbeta
(Cuban Revolutionary Navy)

Teniente de corbeta
(Dominican Navy)

Teniente de corbeta
(Navy of El Salvador)

Teniente de corbeta
(Mexican Navy)

Poručnik korvete
(Montenegrin Navy)

Teniente de corbeta
(Nicaraguan Navy)

Teniente de corbeta
(Paraguayan Navy)

Поручник Корвете
Poručnik korvete
(Serbian River Flotilla)

Poročnik korvete
(Slovenian Navy)

== See also ==
- Corvette
- Corvette captain
