= Corvette captain =

Naval rank equivalent to lieutenant commander

- Common types of insignia
- Country: See gallery
- Service branch: Navies
- Rank group: Senior officer
- NATO rank code: OF-3
- Next higher rank: Frigate captain
- Next lower rank: Ship-of-the-line lieutenant
- Equivalent ranks: Lieutenant commander (Anglophone)

Corvette captain is a rank in many European and Latin American navies which theoretically corresponds to command of a corvette (small warship). The equivalent rank is lieutenant commander in the Royal Navy and other Commonwealth navies, the United States Navy, and the Royal Canadian Navy – a bilingual country which actually uses the term capitaine de corvette (capc) for the rank of lieutenant-commander when written or spoken in French.

Notable users of the rank of corvette captain in Europe include the navies of France, Germany, Italy, Spain, and Croatia. Other users include many Latin American countries.

While the NATO rank code is OF-3, the official translation of the rank as per NATO STANAG 2116 varies between "commander junior grade" and "commander" (with the next senior rank being translated as "commander senior grade"). Some NATO members class their corvette captains as OF-4 when they are serving afloat.

== Germany ==
Korvettenkapitän is an OF3 rank equivalent to the German Army and German Air Force rank of Major.

== Gallery ==
Capitão de corveta
(Angolan Navy)

Capitán de corbeta
(Argentine Navy)

Korvetkapitein
(Belgian Navy)

Capitaine de corvette
(Benin Navy)

Capitán de corbeta
(Bolivian Navy)

Capitão de corveta
(Brazilian Navy)

Capitaine de corvette
(Cameroon Navy)

Capitaine de corvette
Lieutenant-commander
(Royal Canadian Navy)

Capitán de corbeta
(Chilean Navy)

Capitán de corbeta
(Colombian National Navy)

Capitaine de corvette
(Navy of the DR Congo)

Capitaine de corvette
(Congolese Navy)

Kapetan korvete
(Croatian Navy)

Capitán de corbeta
(Cuban Revolutionary Navy)

Capitán de corbeta
(Dominican Navy)

Capitán de corbeta
(Navy of El Salvador)

Capitán de corbeta
(Navy of Equatorial Guinea)

Capitaine de corvette
(French Navy)

Capitaine de corvette
(Gabonese Navy)

Korvettenkapitän
(German Navy)

Capitaine de corvette
(Guinean Navy)

Capitán de corbeta
(Honduran Navy)

Capitano di corvetta
(Italian Navy)

Capitaine de corvette
(Navy of Ivory Coast)

Capitaine de corvette
(Madagascar Navy)

Capitán de corbeta
(Mexican Navy)

Capitán de corbeta
(Nicaraguan Navy)

Kapetan korvete
(Montenegrin Navy)

Capitaine de corvette
(Royal Moroccan Navy)

Capitán de corbeta
(Paraguayan Navy)

Capitán de corbeta
(Peruvian Navy)

Capitaine de corvette
(Senegal Navy)

Капетан Корвете
Kapetan korvete
(Serbian River Flotilla)

Kapitan korvete
(Slovenian Navy)

Capitán de corbeta
(Spanish Navy)

Capitaine de corvette
(Togolese Navy)

Capitaine de corvette
رائد بالبحرية
(Tunisian National Navy)

Capitán de corbeta
(National Navy of Uruguay)

Capitán de corbeta
(Bolivarian Navy of Venezuela)

== See also ==
- Corvette lieutenant
