= Frigate captain =

Naval officer's rank

- Common types of insignia
- Country: See gallery
- Service branch: Navies
- Rank group: Senior officer
- NATO rank code: OF-4
- Next higher rank: Ship-of-the-line captain
- Next lower rank: Corvette captain
- Equivalent ranks: Commander (Anglophone)

Frigate captain is a naval rank in the naval forces of several countries. Corvette captain lies one level below frigate captain.

It is usually equivalent to the Commonwealth/US Navy rank of commander.

Countries using this rank include Argentina, Colombia and Spain (Spanish: capitán de fragata), France (French: capitaine de frégate), Belgium (Dutch: fregatkapitein), Italy (Italian: capitano di fregata), Brazil and Portugal (Portuguese: capitão de fragata), Croatia (Croatian: kapetan fregate) and Germany (German: Fregattenkapitän).

In the Royal Canadian Navy, capitaine de frégate is the official French language name for the rank of commander.

The NATO rank code is OF-4, the official translation for instance of the German Fregattenkapitän as well as the French capitaine de frégate into English is "commander senior grade".

== Germany ==
Fregattenkapitän is a German Navy line officer rank OF-4 equivalent to Oberstleutnant (en: Lieutenant colonel) in the German Army and German Air Force.

== Gallery ==
Capitão de fragata
(Angolan Navy)

Capitán de fragata
(Argentine Navy)

Fregatkapitein
(Belgian Navy)

Capitaine de frégate
(Benin Navy)

Capitán de fragata
(Bolivian Navy)

Capitão de fragata
(Brazilian Navy)

Capitaine de frégate
(Cameroon Navy)

Commander
Capitaine de frégate
(Royal Canadian Navy)

Capitán de fragata
(Chilean Navy)

Capitán de fragata
(Colombian National Navy)

Capitaine de frégate
(Navy of the DR Congo)

Capitaine de frégate
(Congolese Navy)

Kapetan fregate
(Croatian Navy)

Capitán de fragata
(Cuban Revolutionary Navy)

Capitán de fragata
(Dominican Navy)

Capitán de fragata
(Navy of El Salvador)

Capitán de fragata
(Navy of Equatorial Guinea)

Capitaine de frégate
(French Navy)

Capitaine de fregate
(Gabonese Navy)

Fregattenkapitän
(German Navy)

Capitaine de frégate
(Guinean Navy)

Capitão de fragata
(Navy of Guinea-Bissau)

Capitán de fragata
(Honduran Navy)

Capitano di fregata
(Italian Navy)

Capitaine de frégate
(Navy of Ivory Coast)

Capitaine de frégate
(Madagascar Navy)

Capitán de fragata
(Mexican Navy)

Capitán de fragata
(Nicaraguan Navy)

Kapetan fregate
(Montenegrin Navy)

Capitaine de frégate
(Royal Moroccan Navy)

Capitão de fragata
(Mozambique Naval Command)

Capitán de fragata
(Paraguayan Navy)

Capitán de fragata
(Peruvian Navy)

Capitão de fragata
(Portuguese Navy)

Capitão de fragata
(Coast Guard of São Tomé and Príncipe)

Capitaine de frégate
(Senegal Navy)

Капетан Фрегате
Kapetan fregate
(Serbian River Flotilla)

Kapitan fregate
(Slovenian Navy)

Capitán de fragata
(Spanish Navy)

Capitão de fragata
(East Timor Navy)

Capitaine de frégate
(Togolese Navy)

Capitaine de frégate
مقدم بالبحرية
(Tunisian National Navy)

Capitán de fragata
(National Navy of Uruguay)

Capitán de fragata
(Bolivarian Navy of Venezuela)

== See also ==
- Frigate lieutenant
