= Navy of El Salvador =

Salvadoran Navy
- Fuerza Naval de El Salvador
- Founded: 1912 (original); 12 October 1951
- Country: El Salvador
- Branch: Navy
- Type: Naval warfare
- Size: 2,000 personnel
- Part of: Armed Forces of El Salvador
- Mottos: "Patria, Lealtad y Valor" ("Homeland, Loyalty and Valor (Courage)")

Commanders
- Commander-in-Chief: President Nayib Bukele
- Minister of National Defense: Vice Admiral René Merino Monroy
- Chief of the Navy Staff: Vice Admiral Exón Oswaldo Ascencio Albeño

Insignia
- Flag

- Naval jack

The Navy of El Salvador (Spanish: Fuerza Naval de El Salvador) is the naval arm of the Armed Forces of El Salvador. The navy was founded on 12 October 1951.

Built around craft and duties absorbed from the Salvadoran Coast Guard, the navy is primarily composed of patrol boats tasked with coastal patrol and fishery protection. The current fleet is made up of three Camcraft-type patrol boats originally built in the United States for use as oilfield crew boats. New patrol boats have been ordered from Chile to replace or supplement the current, aging ships.

== Current fleet ==
Number/name	Image	Builder	Class	Type	Displacement	Year	Status in NAVY	Details
Patrol Ships
PM06; PM07; PM08		United States	Camcraft-type	Patrol boat	100t	1975	In service (2019)	Builder: Camcraft, Crown Point, USA.
PM10		United States	Swiftships 65 ft class	Patrol boat	36t	1984	In service (2019)	Builder: Swiftships, Morgan City, USA.
PM11		United States	Swiftships 77 ft class	Patrol boat	48t	1985	In service (2019)	Builder: Swiftships, Morgan City, USA.
Coastal Patrol Boats
PC01-08		United States	37-foot Boston Whaler	Patrol boat			In service (2020)	8 donated by US government. Builder: Boston Whaler, USA.
PC02-09		United States	Protector class	Patrol boat	11t	1988: LP01-05 1989: LP06-09	In service (2019)	1998: one unit discarding. In service (2019): 8 units. Builder: SeaArk Marine, Monticello, USA.
Landing crafts
BD02		United States	USN LCM(8) craft	Landing craft	121t	1987	In service (2019)	Builder: SeaArk, Monticello, USA.
BD04; BD05; BD06		United States	USN LCM(8) craft	Landing craft	121t	1950s	In service (2019)	Commissioned 1996, 1996, and 2010
Auxiliary Ships
BL01 General Manuel José Arce		United States	Cactus/Balsam-class	Support vessel	1038t	1942	sunk	Ex-USCGC Madrona. Built as a seagoing buoy tender for the U.S. Coast Guard in 1942. Decommissioned and sold to El Salvador in 2002.

== Future fleet ==
Two (possibly three) new patrol boats have been ordered from Chile. They will be slightly larger than the current patrol boats with a displacement of 107 tons, measure 32.7 x 6.7 x 2.1 meters, and have a crew of 14. They will also be slightly slower with a top speed of 18 knots. Armament will be 1 x 20mm gun, and one 12.7mm machine gun.
