= Frigate lieutenant =

Officer rank in some navies

Frigate lieutenant is a naval rank in the naval forces of several countries.

The rank of Frigate Lieutenant (officially light frigate lieutenant, lieutenant de frégate légère) was a rank in the French Royal Navy until 1786. It was used by officers promoted from outside the ranks of the gardes de la marine, such as merchant navy officers, promoted volunteers or colonial gentry. The rank of frigate lieutenant was equivalent, but junior to, to the rank of ship ensign. Some frigate lieutenants were eventually promoted fireship captains (capitaines de brulôt), equivalent to ship-of-the-line lieutenants.

== Gallery ==
Teniente de fragata
(Argentine Navy)

Teniente de corbeta
(Bolivian Naval Force)

Teniente de fragata
(Colombian National Navy)

Poručnik fregate
(Croatian Navy)

Teniente de fragata
(Cuban Revolutionary Navy)

Teniente de fragata
(Dominican Navy)

Teniente de fragata
(Ecuadorian Navy)

Teniente de fragata
(Navy of El Salvador)

Teniente de fragata
(Honduran Navy)

Teniente de corbeta
(Mexican Navy)

Poručnik fregate
(Montenegrin Navy)

Teniente de fragata
(Nicaraguan Navy)

Teniente de fragata
(Paraguayan Navy)

Поручник Фрегате
Poručnik fregate
(Serbian Navy)

Poročnik fregate
(Slovenian Navy)

Teniente de fragata
(Bolivarian Navy of Venezuela)
