= Podpolkovnik =

Military rank

Countries which use the Eastern European variant

A podpolkovnik (Russian: подполко́вник, lit. 'sub –, junior –, or lower regimentary') is a military rank in Slavic and nearby countries which corresponds to the lieutenant colonel in the English-speaking states and military.

In different languages the exact name of this rank maintains a variety of spellings. The transliteration is also in common usage for the sake of tradition dating back to the Old Slavonic word "polk" (literally: regiment sized unit), and include the following names:

- Azerbaijan — Polkovnik-leytenant
- Belarus — падпалкоўнік (padpalkownik)
- Bosnia and Herzegovina, Croatia, Montenegro and Serbia — потпуковник / potpukovnik (Serbo-Croatian: [pôtpukoːʋniːk])
- Bulgaria — подполковник
- Czech Republic — podplukovník (Czech: [ˈpotplukovɲiːk])
- Georgia — ვიცე-პოლკოვნიკი (Georgian: [vitse pʼolkʼovnikʼi])
- North Macedonia — потполковник (podpolkovnik)
- Poland — podpułkownik (Polish: [pɔtpuwˈkɔvɲik])
- Russia — подполко́вник (podpolkovnik) (Russian: [pətpɐlˈkovnʲɪk])
- Slovenia — podpolkovnik
- Slovakia — podplukovník
- Ukraine — підполковник (pidpolkovnyk)

== Russia ==
Lieutenant colonel Подполко́вник (Podpolkovnik)
- Army and air force insignia
- Country: Russia
- Service branch: Russian Ground Forces; Russian Air Force
- Formation: Early 16th century
- Next higher rank: Polkovnik
- Next lower rank: Majór
- Equivalent ranks: Kapitan 2-go ranga

In Russia, the rank of lieutenant colonel is called podpolkovnik (Russian: подполко́вник, lit. 'sub-colonel'). First it appeared in Russia as appointment or assignment to the assistant or deputy commander of a regiment sized military formation at the end of the 15th — early 16th centuries.

In the Streltsy formations, as a general role, the podpolkovnik was responsible for all administrative tasks and functions. Normally it was of nobility or boyar origin.

From the 17th - to early 17th century, there was a rank and an appointment under the designation polupolkovnik (Russian: полуполко́вник, IPA: [polʊpɐlˈkovnʲɪk]). Beyond its normal responsibilities, he was in charge to command the second half of the regiment, the rear -, reserve -, and other regular units (until the introduction of the battalion structure).

=== Russian Empire ===
From the introduction of the Russian table of ranks to the abolishment in 1917, podpolkovnik was quoted to rank positioned VII, and until 1856, it was privileged by hereditary nobility.

In 1884, as the mayor rank in the Russian army was suppressed, all mayors, by exemption of retirement, loss of civil rights, or mercilessly, were converted to podpolkovnik. From this moment, the rank podpolkovnik was equivalent to the rank armed forces' starshina (Russian: войскова́я старшина́, romanized: voyskovaja starshina, lit. 'head of the armed forces', pronounced [vəjskɐˈvajə stərʂɨˈna]). Before 1884, the armed forces' starshina was adequate to mayor. In line to this reform, the shoulder board rank insignia had been changed from two big stars to three smaller ones.

To the formations of the so-called leyb-guard (Russian: лейб гва́рдия, romanized: leyb-gvardija, IPA: [lʲejb ˈɡvardʲɪjə]), the rank podpolkovnik had not been introduced. Normally, kapitan officers might have been promoted to polkovnik immediately, by skipping the ranks major and podpolkovnik.

In the Imperial Russian Navy, the rank Kapitan 2nd rank was equivalent to podpolkovnik, in the civil administration it was corresponding to privy councillor (Russian: надво́рный сове́тник, romanized: nadvornjy sovetnik, IPA: [nɐˈdvornɨj sɐˈvʲetʲnʲɪk]). The rank podpolkovnik was abolished 16 December 1917, together with all previous ranks and rank insignia of the former Russian imperial army.

In the white voluntary army, the rank was in the period from December 1917 to November 1918. Then it was abolished as well, and harmonized to the Kapitan ranks of the guard and other officers of the other formations. However, in the Russian army of general Pyotr Nikolayevich Wrangel the podpolkovnik rank was reestablished in April 1920.

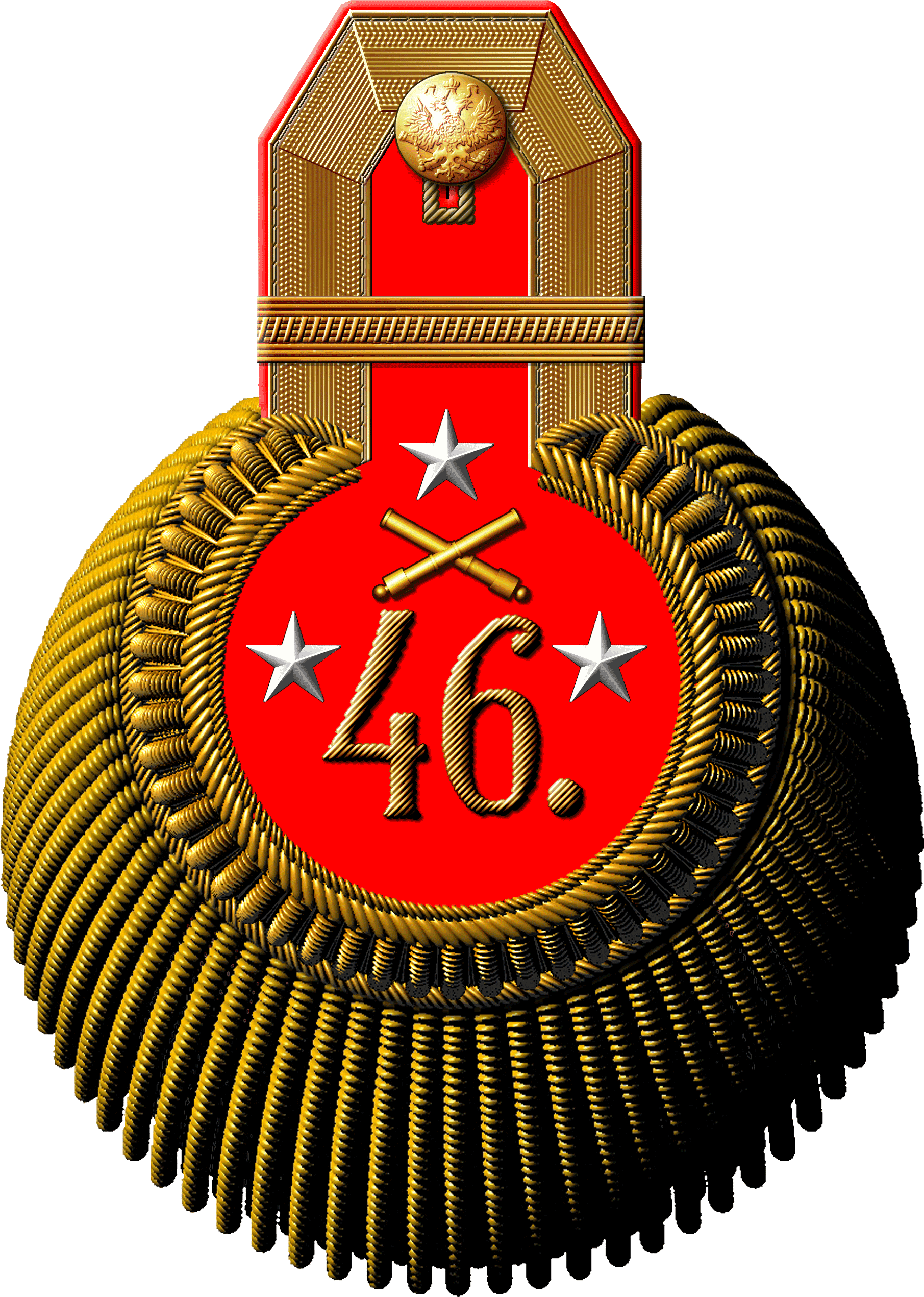
Epaulette Podpolkovnik of Imperial Russian Army (by 1911)

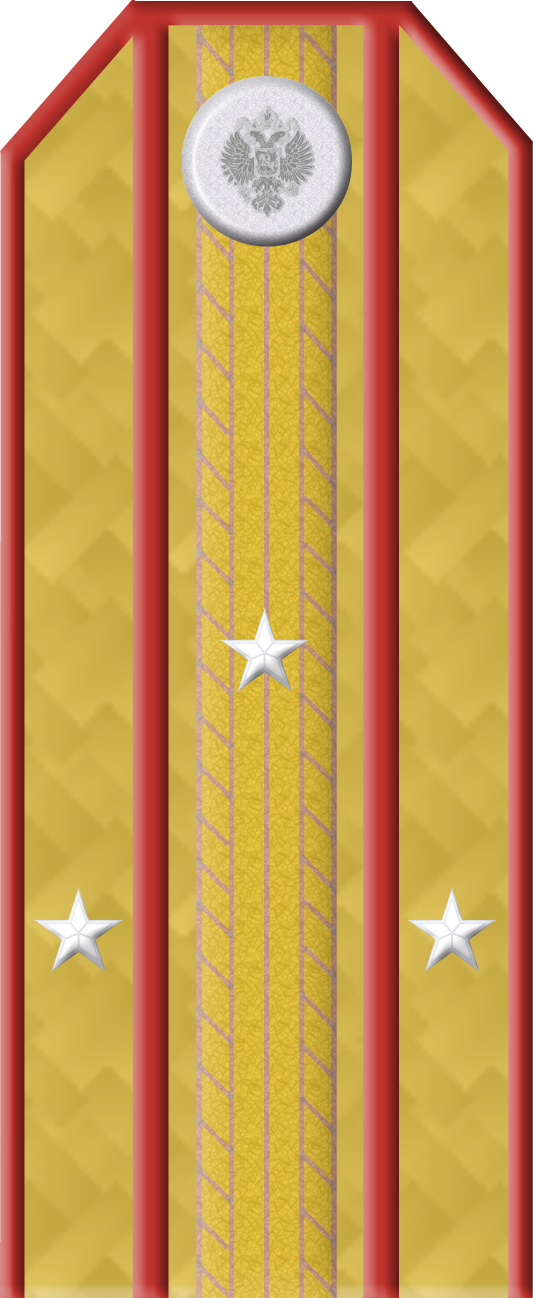
Shoulder board

=== USSR ===
By foundation of the Soviet Union, the rank designation and rank insignia of the Imperial Russian Army were suppressed. An equivalent rank to podpolkovnik was created in 1924, by the introduction of the so-called status category 8 rank – (English: 'assistant commander of the regiment and equivalent personnel'; Russian: помо́щник команди́ра полка́ и ему́ ра́вные, IPA: [pɐˈmoʂnʲɪk kəmɐnʲˈdʲirə pɐlˈka i jɪˈmu ˈravnɨje]). However, this was overtaken by the introduction of individual ranks in 1935.

Podpolkovnik as a military rank was reintroduced on September 1, 1939, by disposal of the Central Executive Committee of the Soviet Union (from September 2, 1939), and the Council of People's Commissars of the USSR No. 2690 (article 41, pertaining the law of universal compulsory military service), published by the order No. 226 of the People's Commissar of Defence (from July 26, 1940).

The Red Army used this rank together with a number of other former Russian ranks, and it has been used in many ex-USSR countries, including Russia, to the present day.

By the first promotion to that particular rank the hitherto (old) polkovnik collar distinction insignia with three parallel bars had to be used. The new polkovnik rank was from now on characterized by four bars. This insignia had to be worn until the introduction of shoulder boards, and were finally replaced in 1943.

In the Soviet navy, the rank kapitan 2nd rank was equivalent to podpolkovnik. In the civil administration it was corresponding to privy councillor (Russian: надво́рный сове́тник). The rank podpolkovnik was abolished 16 December 1917, together with all previous ranks and rank insignia of the former Russian imperial army. In the military political organization, it was equivalent to starshy battalion commissar (Russian: ста́рший батальо́нный комисса́р, IPA: [ˈstarʂɨj bətɐˈlʲjɵnːɨj kəmʲɪˈsar]), another corresponding rank designation was Specialist 1st rank (pertaining to: military engineers, surgeons, commissionaires, veterinary surgeons, and legal personnel).

1943—1992

In late 1943, shoulder boards were reintroduced as rank designation. From this moment in the podpolkovnik rank of the Red Army was specified by two big horizontal stars, on shoulder boards, with parallel piping (two straps). The stars had to be established on a distance of 35 mm from the lower end of the shoulder board (Rules to wear military uniforms in the Soviet Army and the Navy). From 7 November 1944, the stars were pinned direct (symmetrically to the piping) on piping.

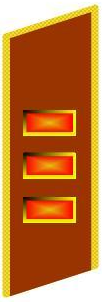
Collar tab of the Red Army (1940-1943)

... Soviet Air Force (1940-1943)

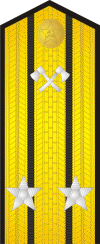
Shoulder board of Red Army engineers (1943-1946)/Soviet Army (1946-55)

Parade uniform, Soviet Army (1955-1994, reused in 2010)

... Airborne Force, Air Force, Aviation of the Defence Force (1955-1994), and since 2010

=== Russian Federation ===
If military personnel serves in a guards formation, or on a guards war ship, to the rank designation will be placed in front the noun guards (e.g. "Guards podpolkovnik"). Civil – or military personnel with a specific defined level of expertise or knowledge in medical or judicial professions, to the military rank will be added the noun "legal" or the wording "medical service". Further adding to the military rank designation might be "retired" or "on retirement".

Personnel serving in the executive of the Russian Federation might be specified by rank designation as follows.

- Podpolkovnik of the Police (until March 1, 2011 Podpolkovnik of the Militsiya)
- Podpolkovnik of the Internal Troops
- Podpolkovnik Investigation of Tax Offence
Parade uniform, Russian Ground Forces (1994-2010)

Parade uniform, Russian Ground Forces (2010-present)

Office uniform, Russian Ground Forces

Office uniform, Russian Air Force

Field uniform

Podpolkovnik of the Russian Police (until 2011 — Militsiya), also Internal Troops

== Lieutenant colonel's insignia ==
Падпалкоўнік
Padpalkoŭnik
(Belarusian Ground Forces)

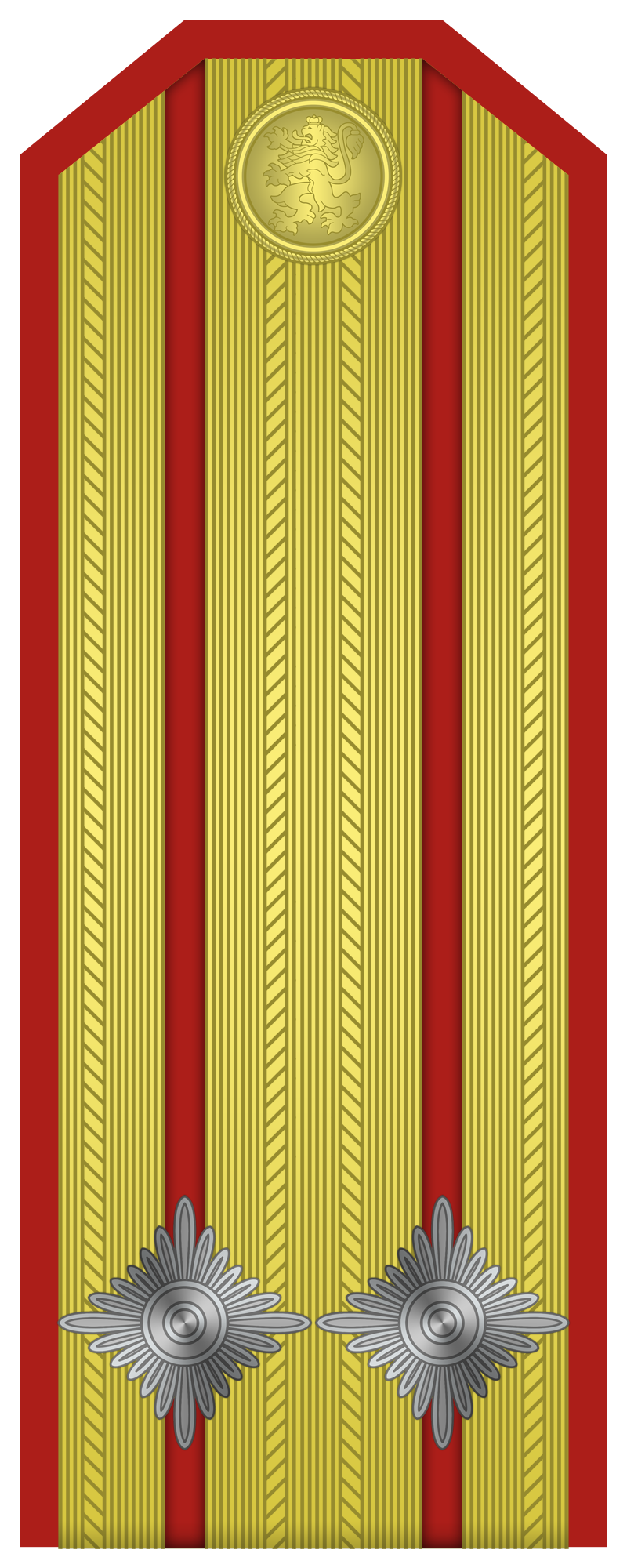
Подполковник
Podpolkovnik
(Bulgarian Land Forces)

Podplukovník
(Czech Land Forces)

Подполковник
Podpolkovnïk
(Kazakh Ground Forces)

Подполковник
Podpolkovnik
(Kyrgyz Army)

Потполковник
Potpolkovnik
(North Macedonia Ground Forces)

Potpukovnik
(Montenegrin Ground Army)

Podpułkownik
(Polish Land Forces)

Подполко́вник
Podpolkóvnik
(Russian Ground Forces)

Потпуковник
Potpukovnik
(Serbian Army)

Podplukovník
(Slovak Ground Forces)

Podpolkovnik
(Slovenian Ground Force)

Подполковник
Podpolkovnik
(Tajik National Army)

Podpolkownik
(Turkmen Ground Forces)

Підполковник
Pidpolkovnyk
(Ukrainian Ground Forces)

Podpolkovnik
(Uzbek Ground Forces)

== See also ==
- Lieutenant (Eastern Europe)
- Polkovnik
- Lieutenant colonel general
- Comparative army officer ranks of Europe
