= Ship-of-the-line lieutenant =

Naval officer rank

Ship-of-the-line lieutenant (French: Lieutenant de vaisseau; Spanish: Teniente de navío) is a naval officer rank, used in a number of countries. The name derives from the name of the largest class of warship, the ship of the line, as opposed to smaller types of warship (corvettes and frigates).

It is rated OF-2 within the NATO ranking system and is equivalent to Lieutenant in the Royal Navy and the United States Navy.

== Gallery ==
Tenente-de-navio
(Angolan Navy)

Teniente de navío
(Argentine Navy)

Lieutenant de vaisseau
(German: Linienschiffsleutnant)
(Belgian Navy)

Lieutenant de vaisseau
(Benin Navy)

Teniente de navio
(Bolivian Naval Force)

Lieutenant de vaisseau
(Cameroon Navy)

Lieutenant (N)
(French: Lieutenant de vaisseau)
(Royal Canadian Navy)

Teniente de navío
(Colombian National Navy)

Lieutenant de vaisseau
(Navy of the DR Congo)

Lieutenant de vaisseau
(Congolese Navy)

Poručnik bojnog broda
(Croatian Navy)

Teniente de navío
(Cuban Revolutionary Navy)

Teniente de navio
(Dominican Navy)

Teniente de navío
(Ecuadorian Navy)

Teniente de navio
(Navy of El Salvador)

Teniente de navío
(Navy of Equatorial Guinea)

Lieutenant de vaisseau
(French Navy)

Lieutenant de vaisseau
(Gabonese Navy)

Lieutenant de vaisseau
(Guinean Navy)

Teniente de navio
(Honduran Navy)

Tenente di vascello
(Italian Navy)

Lieutenant de vaisseau
(Navy of Ivory Coast)

Lieutenant de vaisseau
(Madagascar Navy)

Teniente de navio
(Mexican Navy)

Poručnik bojnog broda
(Montenegrin Navy)

Lieutenant de vaisseau
(Royal Moroccan Navy)

Teniente de navío
(Nicaraguan Navy)

Teniente de navío
(Paraguayan Navy)

Lieutenant de vaisseau
(Senegal Navy)

Poručnik bojnog broda
(Serbian River Flotilla)

Poročnik bojne ladje
(Slovenian Navy)

Teniente de navío
(Spanish Navy)

Lieutenant de vaisseau
(Togolese Navy)

Lieutenant de vaisseau
(Arabic: نقيب بالبحرية, romanized: Naqib bialbahria)
(Tunisia Navy)

Teniente de navío
(National Navy of Uruguay)

Teniente de navío
(Bolivarian Navy of Venezuela)

== See also ==
- Ship-of-the-line captain
