= Comparative navy officer ranks of Post-Soviet states =

Post-Soviet Navy officer ranks

Rank comparison chart of all navies of Post-Soviet states.

== Officers (OF 1–10) ==
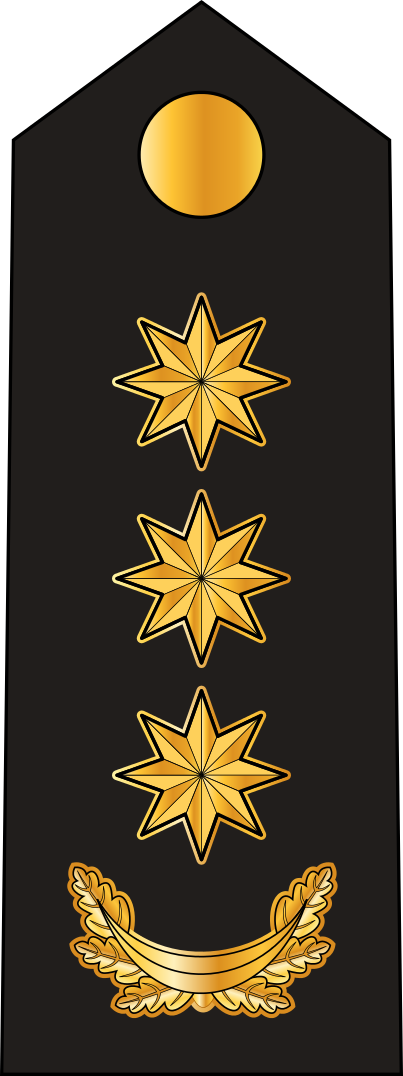
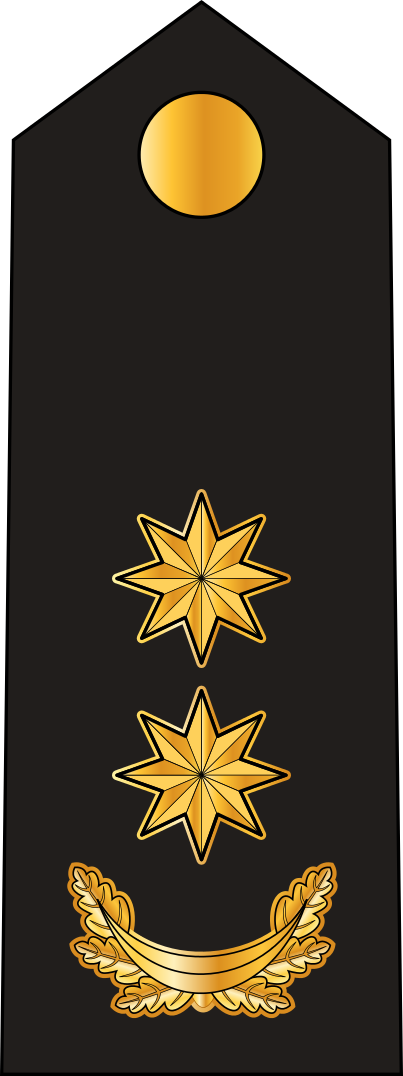
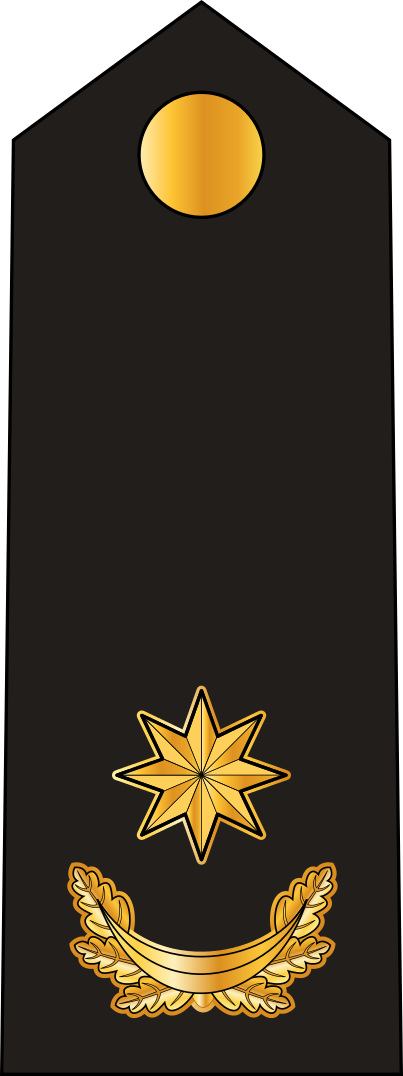
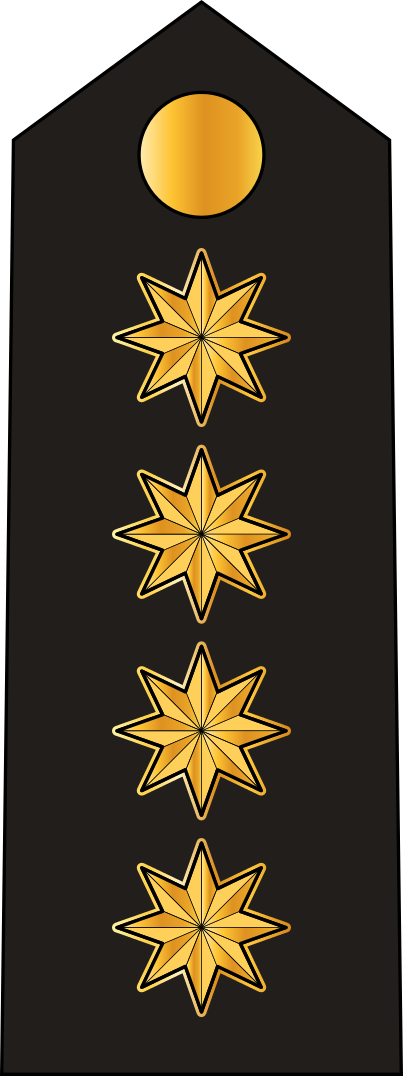
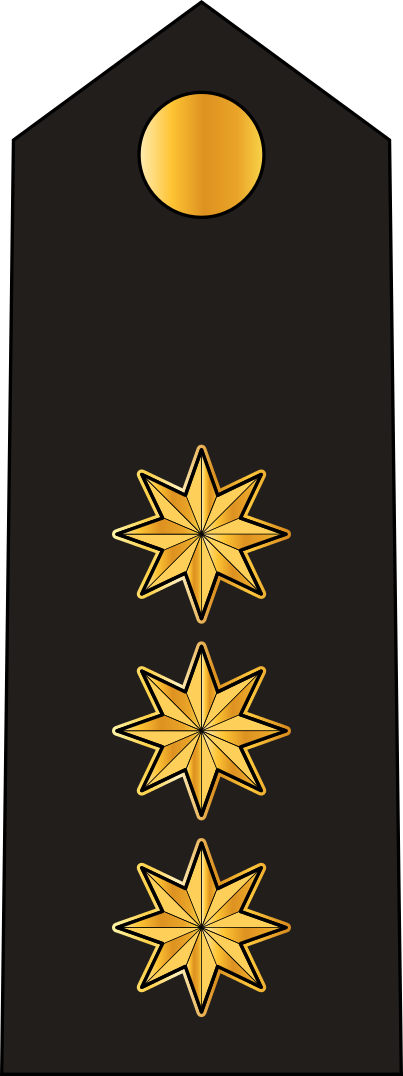
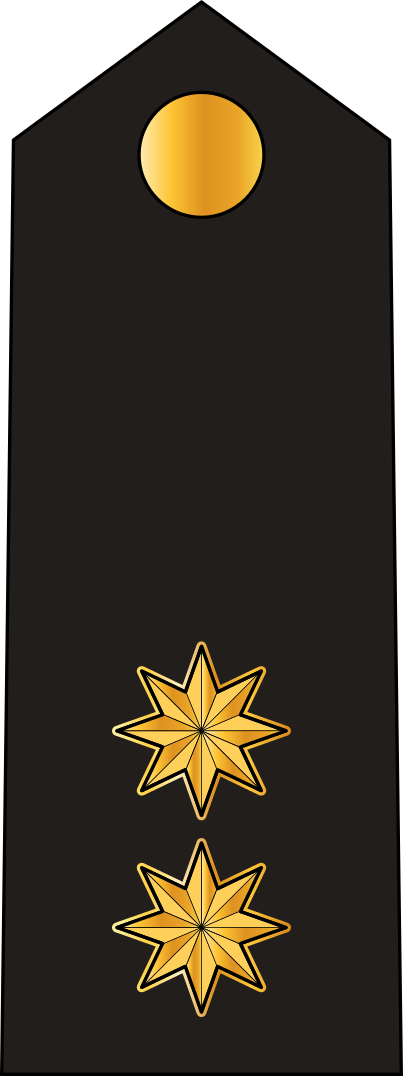
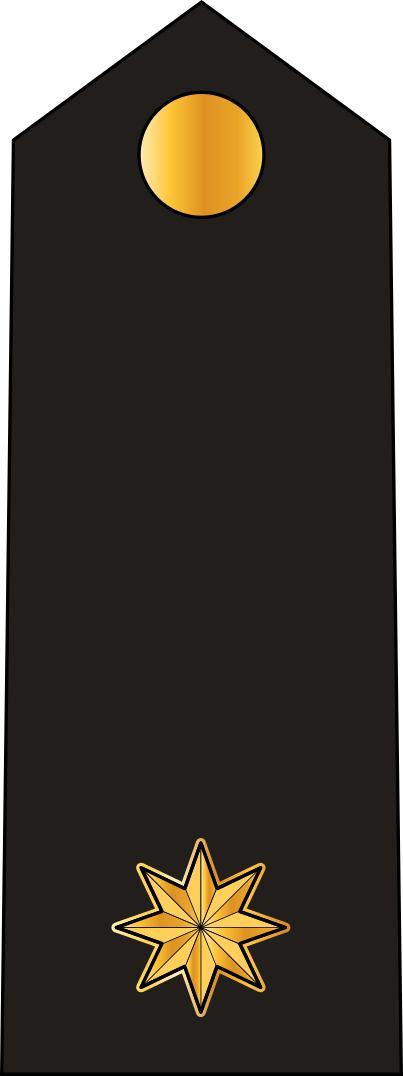
Rank group	General / flag officers					Senior officers			Junior officers
Armenia	No navy
Azerbaijani Navy
Azerbaijani Navy			Admiral	Vitse-admiral	Kontr-admiral	Birinci dərəcəli kapitan	Ikinci dərəcəli kapitan	Üçüncü dərəcəli kapitan	Kapitan-leytenant	Baş leytenant	Leytenant	Kiçik leytenant
Belarus	No navy
Estonian Navy
Estonian Navy		Admiral	Viitseadmiral	Kontradmiral	Kommodoor	Mereväekapten	Kaptenleitnant	Kaptenmajor	Vanemleitnant	Leitnant	Nooremleitnant	Lipnik
(Georgia (country)) Georgia	No navy
Rank group	General / flag officers					Senior officers			Junior officers
Kazakh Naval Forces
Kazakh Naval Forces	Жоғарғы Бас қолбасшының Joğarğı Bas qolbasşınıñ		Адмирал; Admïral	Вице-адмирал; Vice-admïral	Контр-адмирал; Kontr-admïral	Бірінші дәрежелі капитан Birinşi därejeli kapïtan	Екінші дәрежелі капитан Ekinşi därejeli kapïtan	Үшінші дәрежелі капитан Üşinşi därejeli kapïtan	Капитан-лейтенант; Kapïtan-leytenant	Аға лейтенант Ağa leytenant		Лейтенант; Leytenant
Kyrgyzstan	No navy
Latvian Naval Forces
Latvian Naval Forces			Viceadmirālis	Kontradmirālis	Flotiles admirālis	Jūras kapteinis	Komandkapteinis	Komandleitnants	Kapteiņleitnants	Virsleitnants		Leitnants
Lithuanian Naval Force
Lithuanian Naval Force		Admirolas	Viceadmirolas	Kontradmirolas	Flotilės admirolas	Jūrų kapitonas	Komandoras	Komandoras leitenantas	Kapitonas leitenantas	Vyresnysis leitenantas		Leitenantas
Moldova	No navy
Rank group	General / flag officers					Senior officers			Junior officers
Russian Navy
Russian Navy		Адмирал флота Admiral flota	Адмирал; Admiral	Вице-адмирал; Vitse-admiral	Контр-адмирал; Contre-admiral	Капитан 1-го ранга Kapitan 1-go ranga	Капитан 2-го ранга Kapitan 2-go ranga	Капитан 3-го ранга Kapitan 3-go ranga	Капитан-лейтенант; Kapitan-leytenant	Старший лейтенант Starshiy leytenant	Лейтенант; Leytenant	Младший лейтенант Mladshiy leytenant
Tajikistan	No navy
Turkmen Naval Forces
Turkmen Naval Forces		Flot admiraly	Admiral	Wise-admiral	Kontr-admiral	1-nji derejeli kapitan	2-nji derejeli kapitan	3-nji derejeli kapitan	Kapitan-leýtenant	Uly leýtenant	Leýtenant	Kiçi leýtenant
Ukrainian Navy
Ukrainian Navy		Адмірал; Admiral	Віце-адмірал; Vitse-admiral	Контр-адмірал; Kontr-admiral	Коммодор; Kommodor	Капітан I рангу Kapitan I ranhu	Капітан II рангу Kapitan II ranhu	Капітан III рангу Kapitan III ranhu	Капітан-лейтенант; Kapitan-leytenant	Старший лейтенант Starshyy leytenant	Лейтенант; Leytenant	Молодший лейтенант Molodshyy leytenant
Uzbek River Force
Uzbek River Force						I rang kapitani	II rang kapitani	III rang kapitani	Kapitan-leytenant	Katta leytenant		Leytenant
Rank group	General / flag officers					Senior officers			Junior officers

== See also ==
- Comparative navy officer ranks of Asia
- Comparative navy officer ranks of Europe
