= Ranks and insignia of NATO navies' officers =

Each officer rank in the navy of a NATO country may be compared with the ranks used by any military service in other NATO countries, under a standardized NATO rank scale. This is useful, for instance, in establishing seniority amongst officers serving alongside each other within multinational command structures.

The grades, prefixed OF- (commissioned officers) and WO- (warrant officers) were established in the document STANAG 2116, formally titled NATO Codes for Grades of Military Personnel.

In many navies, two separate ranks fall within the OF-1 grade. These particular ranks, known by various names in different navies, are commonly given the less formal grades of "OF-1a" (more senior) and "OF-1b" (less senior).

== Officers (OF-1 – 10) ==
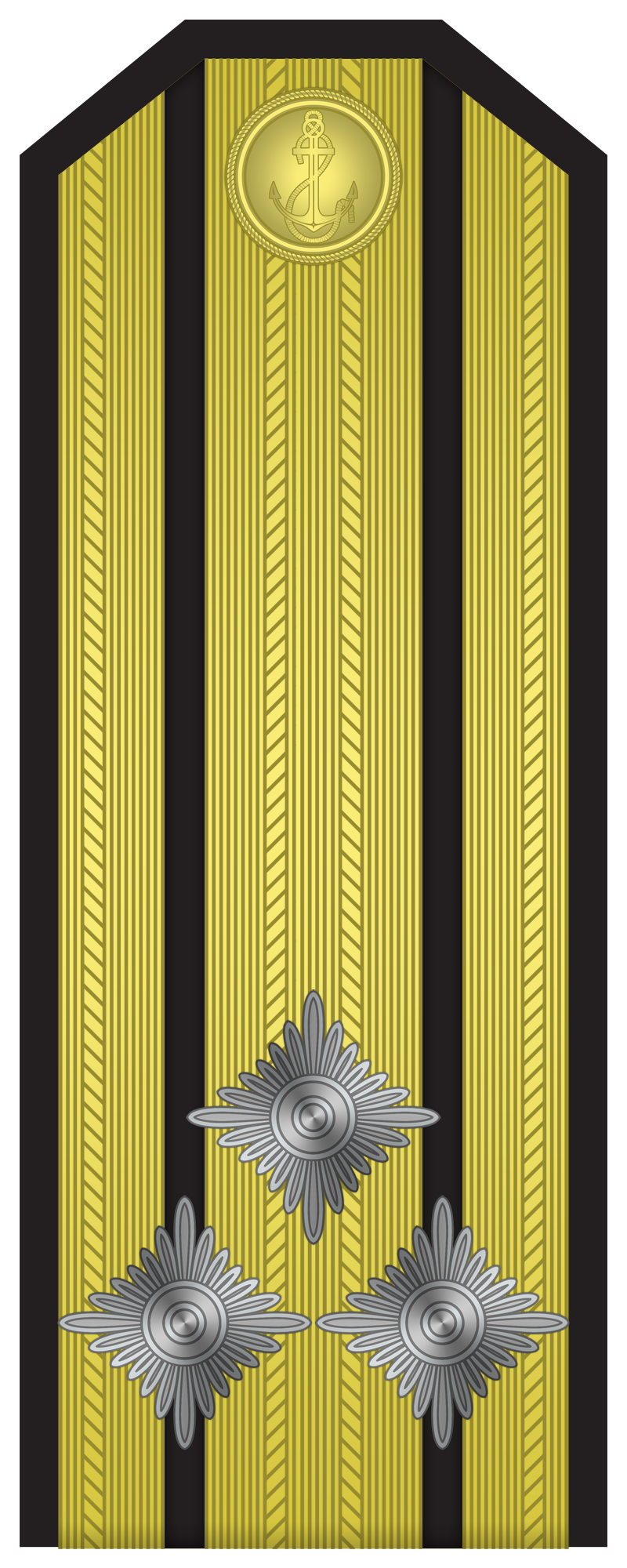
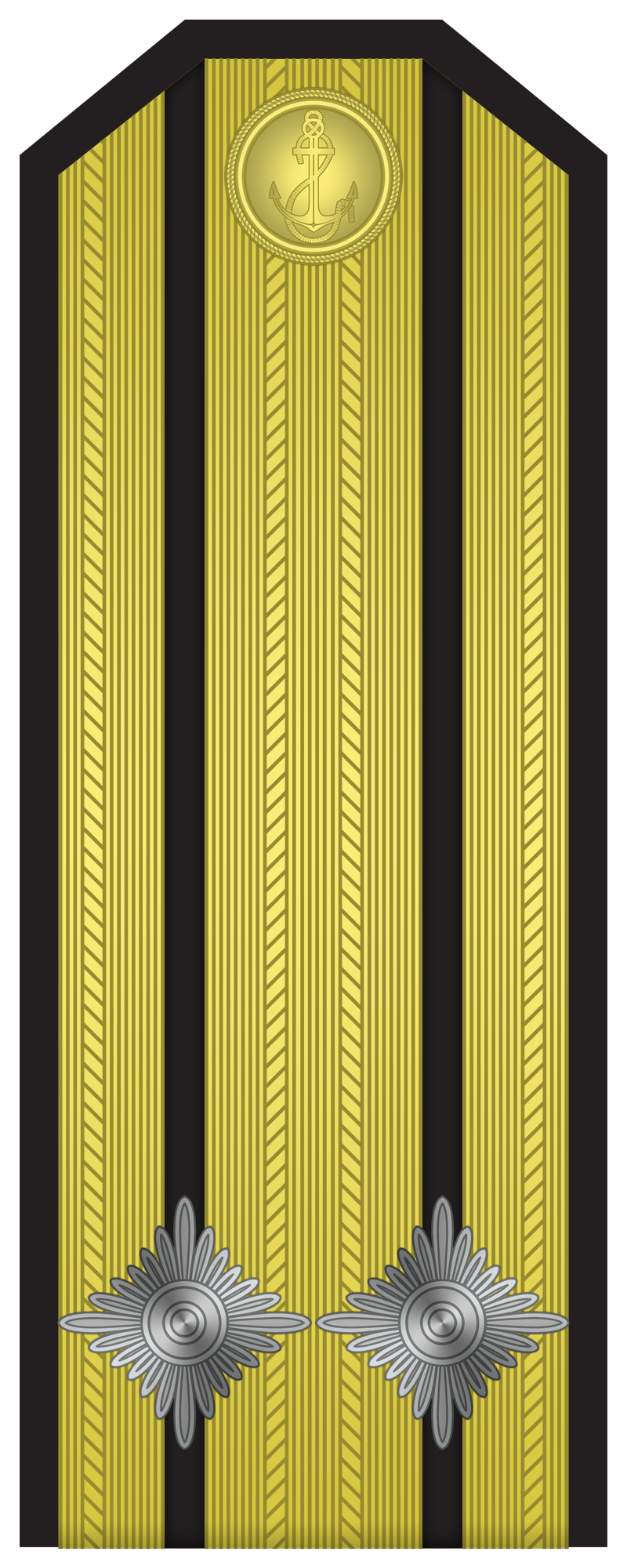
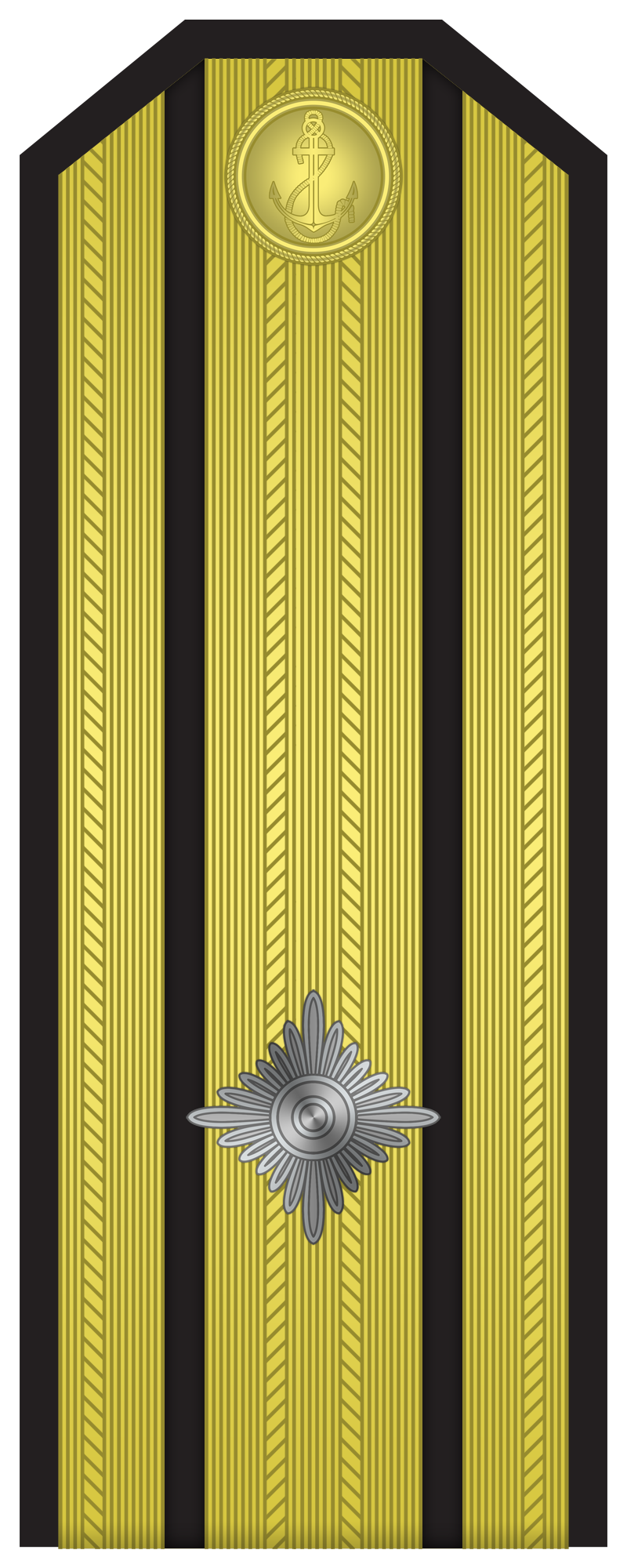
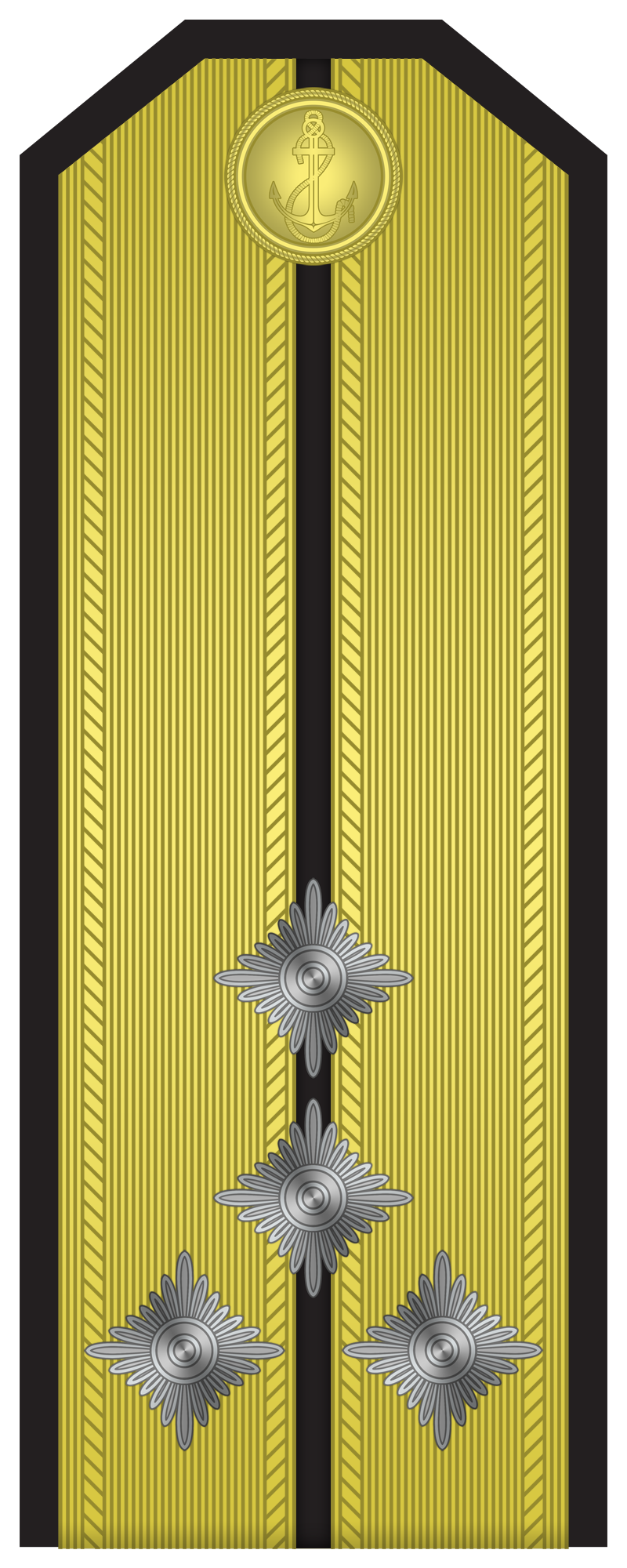
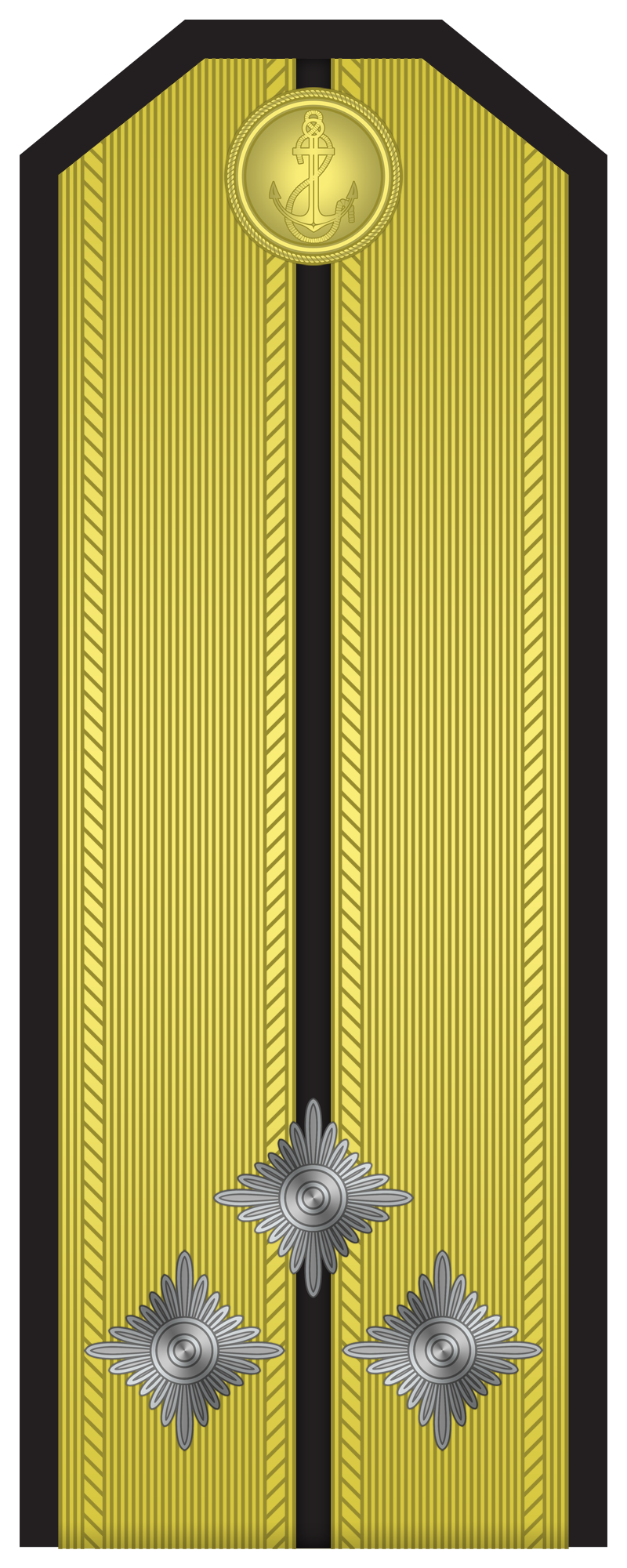
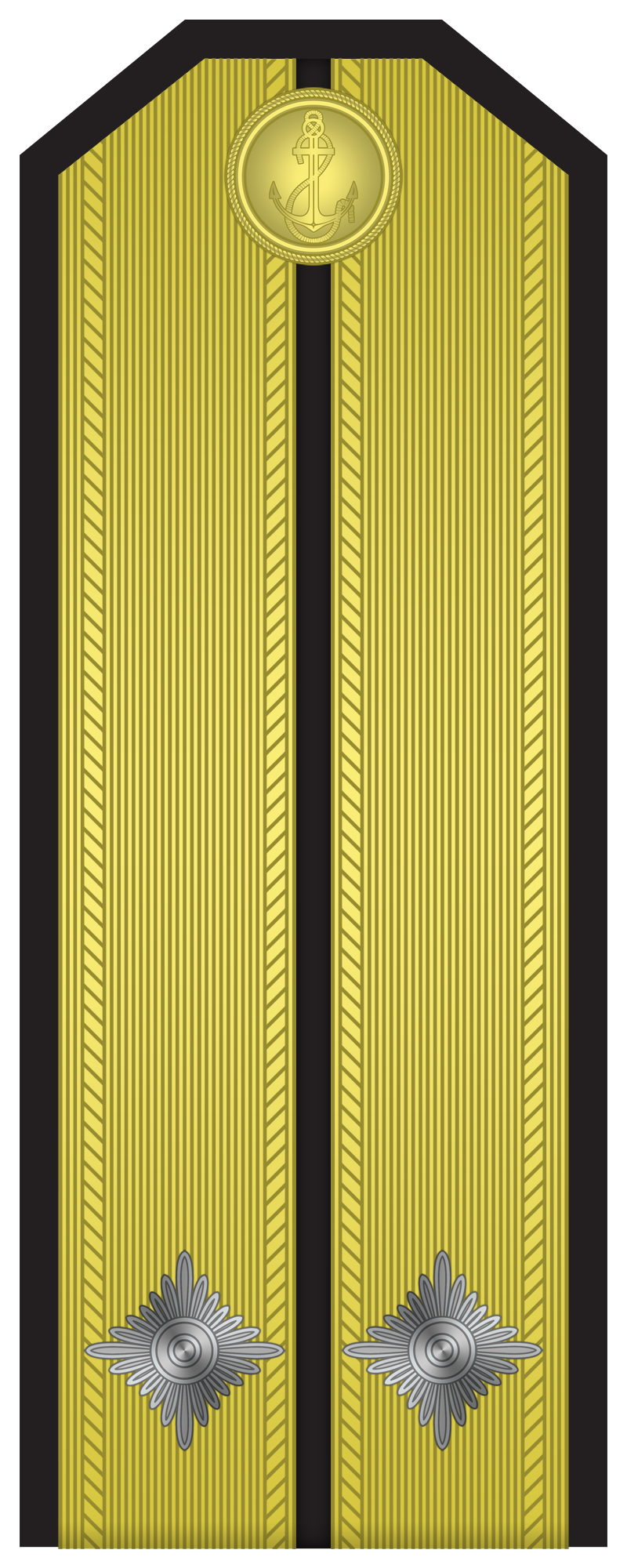
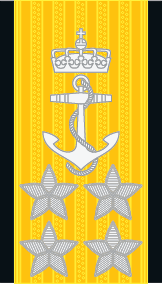
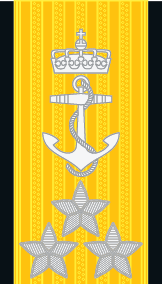
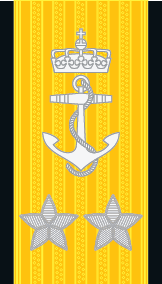
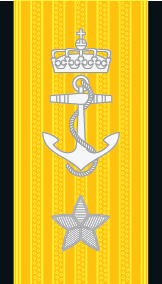
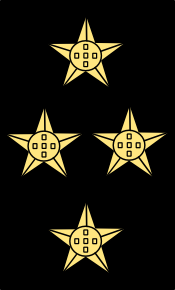
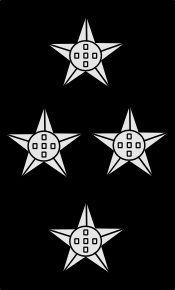
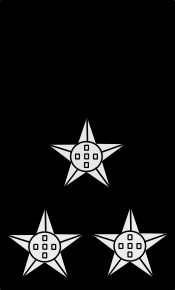
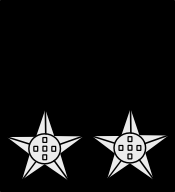
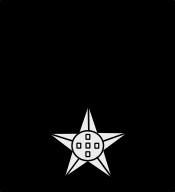
NATO code	OF-10	OF-9	OF-8	OF-7	OF-6	OF-5	OF-4		OF-3		OF-2		OF-1
Albanian Naval Force
Albanian Naval Force			Admiral	Nënadmiral	Kundëradmiral	Kapiten rangut I	Kapiten rangut II		Kapiten rangut III		Kapiten lejtnant		Lejtnant		Nënlejtnant
Belgian Navy
Belgian Navy		Admiraal	Vice-admiraal	Divisieadmiraal	Flottieljeadmiraal	Kapitein-ter-zee	Fregatkapitein		Korvetkapitein	Luitenant-ter-zee 1ste klasse	Luitenant-ter-zee		Vaandrig-ter-zee		Vaandrig-ter-zee 2de klasse
Belgian Navy		Amiral	Vice-amiral	Amiral de division	Amiral de flottille	Capitaine de vaisseau	Capitaine de frégate		Capitaine de corvette	Lieutenant de vaisseau de 1^{re} classe	Lieutenant de vaisseau		Enseigne de vaisseau		Enseigne de vaisseau de 2^{e} classe
Belgian Navy		Admiral	Vizeadmiral	Divisionsadmiral	Flotillenadmiral	Kapitän zur See	Fregattenkapitän		Korvettenkapitän	Linienschiffsleutnant 1. klasse	Linienschiffsleutnant		Seefahnrich		Seefahnrich 2. klasse
Bulgarian Navy
Bulgarian Navy		Адмирал; Admiral	Вицеадмирал; Vitseadmiral	Контраадмирал; Kontraadmiral	Флотилен адмирал Flotilen admiral	Капитан I ранг Kapitan I rang	Капитан II ранг Kapitan II rang		Капитан III ранг Kapitan III rang		Капитан-лейтенант; Kapitan-leytenant		Старши лейтенант Starshi leĭtenant		Лейтенант; Leytenant
Royal Canadian Navy
Royal Canadian Navy		Admiral	Vice-admiral	Rear-admiral	Commodore	Captain (N)	Commander		Lieutenant-commander		Lieutenant (N)		Sub-lieutenant		Acting sub-lieutenant
Royal Canadian Navy		Amiral(e)	Vice-amiral(e)	Contre-amiral(e)	Commodore	Capitaine de vaisseau	Capitaine de frégate		Capitaine de corvette		Lieutenant(e) de vaisseau		Enseigne de vaisseau de 1^{re} classe		Enseigne de vaisseau de 2^{e} classe
Croatian Navy
Croatian Navy	Admiral flote	Admiral	Viceadmiral	Kontraadmiral	Komodor	Kapetan bojnog broda	Kapetan fregate		Kapetan korvete		Poručnik bojnog broda		Poručnik fregate		Poručnik korvete
Czech Republic	No navy
Royal Danish Navy
Royal Danish Navy		Admiral	Viceadmiral	Kontreadmiral	Flotilleadmiral	Kommandør	Kommandørkaptajn		Orlogskaptajn		Kaptajnløjtnant		Premierløjtnant		Løjtnant
Estonian Navy
Estonian Navy		Admiral	Viitseadmiral	Kontradmiral	Kommodoor	Mereväekapten	Kaptenleitnant		Kaptenmajor		Vanemleitnant		Leitnant	Nooremleitnant	Lipnik
NATO code	OF-10	OF-9	OF-8	OF-7	OF-6	OF-5	OF-4		OF-3		OF-2		OF-1
Finnish Navy
Finnish Navy		Amiraali	Vara-amiraali	Kontra-amiraali	Lippueamiraali	Kommodori	Komentaja		Komentajakapteeni		Kapteeniluutnantti		Yliluutnantti	Luutnantti	Aliluutnantti
Finnish Navy		Amiral	Viceamiral	Konteramiral	Flottiljamiral	Kommodor	Kommendör		Kommendörkapten		Kaptenlöjtnant		Premiärlöjtnant	Löjtnant	Underlöjtnant
French Navy
French Navy	Amiral de France	Amiral	Vice-amiral d'escadre	Vice-amiral	Contre-amiral	Capitaine de vaisseau	Capitaine de frégate		Capitaine de corvette		Lieutenant de vaisseau		Enseigne de vaisseau de 1^{re} classe		Enseigne de vaisseau de 2^{e} classe
German Navy
German Navy		Admiral	Vizeadmiral	Konteradmiral	Flottillenadmiral	Kapitän zur See	Fregattenkapitän		Korvettenkapitän		Stabskapitänleutnant	Kapitänleutnant	Oberleutnant zur See		Leutnant zur See
Hellenic Navy
Hellenic Navy		Ναύαρχος; Navarchos	Αντιναύαρχος; Antinavarchos	Υποναύαρχος; Yponavarchos	Αρχιπλοίαρχος; Archiploiarchos	Πλοίαρχος; Ploiarchos	Αντιπλοίαρχος; Antiploiarchos		Πλωτάρχης; Plotarchis		Υποπλοίαρχος; Ypoploiarchos		Ανθυποπλοίαρχος; Anthypoploiarchos		Σημαιοφόρος; Simaioforos
Hungarian River Guard
Hungarian River Guard						Ezredes	Alezredes		Őrnagy		Százados		Főhadnagy		Hadnagy
Icelandic Coast Guard
Icelandic Coast Guard				Forstjóri Landhelgisgæslunnar	Framkvæmdastjóri aðgerðasviðs	Framkvæmdastjóri siglingasviðs / Framkvæmdastjóri varnarmálasviðs	Flugrekstrarstjóri / Flaggskipherra / Yfirflugstjóri / Tæknistjóri	Skipherrar / Flugstjórar / Deildarstjórar	Næstráðandi / Yfirstýrimaður / Flugmaður / Yfirvélstjóri		Yfirmaður eftir 6 ár / Stýrimaður / Vélstjóri / Flugmaður		Yfirmaður eftir 2 ár / Stýrimaður / Vélstjóri / Flugmaður		Byrjandi í yfirmannastöðu
Italian Navy
Italian Navy		Ammiraglio	Ammiraglio di squadra	Ammiraglio di divisione	Contrammiraglio	Capitano di vascello	Capitano di fregata		Capitano di corvetta		Tenente di vascello		Sottotenente di vascello		Guardiamarina
Latvian Naval Forces
Latvian Naval Forces			Viceadmirālis	Kontradmirālis	Flotiles admirālis	Jūras kapteinis	Komandkapteinis		Komandleitnants		Kapteiņleitnants		Virsleitnants		Leitnants
NATO code	OF-10	OF-9	OF-8	OF-7	OF-6	OF-5	OF-4		OF-3		OF-2		OF-1
Lithuanian Naval Force
Lithuanian Naval Force		Admirolas	Viceadmirolas	Kontradmirolas	Flotilės admirolas	Jūrų kapitonas	Komandoras		Komandoras leitenantas		Kapitonas leitenantas		Vyresnysis leitenantas		Leitenantas
Luxembourg	No navy
Montenegrin Navy
Montenegrin Navy		Admiral	Vice admiral	Kontra admiral	Komodor	Kapetan bojnog broda	Kapetan fregate		Kapetan korvete		Poručnik bojnog broda		Poručnik fregate		Poručnik korvete
North Macedonia	No navy
Royal Netherlands Navy
Royal Netherlands Navy		Luitenant-Admiraal	Vice-Admiraal	Schout-bij-Nacht	Commandeur	Kapitein ter zee	Kapitein-luitenant ter zee		Luitenant ter zee der 1^{ste} klasse		Luitenant ter zee der 2^{de} klasse oudste categorie		Luitenant ter zee der 2^{de} klasse		Luitenant ter zee der 3^{de} klasse
Royal Norwegian Navy
Royal Norwegian Navy		Admiral	Viseadmiral	Kontreadmiral	Flaggkommandør	Kommandør	Kommandørkaptein		Orlogskaptein		Kapteinløytnant		Løytnant		Fenrik
Polish Navy
Polish Navy	Marszałek Polski	Admirał	Admirał floty	Wiceadmirał	Kontradmirał	Komandor	Komandor porucznik		Komandor podporucznik		Kapitan marynarki		Porucznik marynarki		Podporucznik marynarki
Portuguese Navy
Portuguese Navy	Almirante da Armada	Almirante	Vice-almirante	Contra-almirante	Comodoro	Capitão de mar e guerra	Capitão de fragata		Capitão-tenente		Primeiro-tenente		Segundo-tenente		Guarda-marinha/ Subtenente
NATO code	OF-10	OF-9	OF-8	OF-7	OF-6	OF-5	OF-4		OF-3		OF-2		OF-1
Romanian Naval Forces
Romanian Naval Forces	Mareșal	Amiral	Viceamiral	Contraamiral	Contraamiral de flotilă	Comandor	Căpitan-comandor		Locotenent-comandor		Căpitan		Locotenent		Aspirant
Slovakia	No navy
Slovenian Navy
Slovenian Navy		Admiral	Vice admiral	Kontraadmiral	Kapitan	Kapitan bojne ladje	Kapitan fregate		Kapitan korvete		Poročnik bojne ladje		Poročnik fregate		Poročnik korvete
Spanish Navy
Spanish Navy	Capitán general	Almirante general	Almirante	Vicealmirante	Contralmirante	Capitán de navío	Capitán de fragata		Capitán de corbeta		Teniente de navío		Alférez de navío		Alférez de fragata
Spanish Marine Infantry
Spanish Marine Infantry			Teniente general	General de división	General de brigada	Coronel	Teniente coronel		Comandante		Capitán		Teniente		Alférez
Swedish Navy
Swedish Navy		Amiral	Viceamiral	Konteramiral	Flottiljamiral	Kommendör	Kommendörkapten		Örlogskapten		Kapten		Löjtnant		Fänrik
(Sweden) Swedish Amphibious Corps
(Sweden) Swedish Amphibious Corps		General	Generallöjtnant	Generalmajor	Brigadgeneral	Överste	Överstelöjtnant		Major		Kapten		Löjtnant		Fänrik
Turkish Naval Forces
Turkish Naval Forces	Büyük amiral	Oramiral	Koramiral	Tümamiral	Tuğamiral	Albay	Yarbay		Binbaşı		Yüzbaşı		Üsteğmen	Teğmen	Asteğmen
Royal Navy
Royal Navy	Admiral of the Fleet	Admiral	Vice admiral	Rear admiral	Commodore	Captain	Commander		Lieutenant commander		Lieutenant		Sub lieutenant		Midshipman
Royal Marines
Royal Marines		General	Lieutenant-general	Major-general	Brigadier	Colonel	Lieutenant colonel		Major		Captain		Lieutenant		Second lieutenant
United States Navy
United States Navy	Fleet admiral	Admiral	Vice admiral	Rear admiral	Rear admiral (lower half)	Captain	Commander		Lieutenant commander		Lieutenant		Lieutenant (junior grade)		Ensign
United States Marine Corps
United States Marine Corps		General	Lieutenant general	Major general	Brigadier general	Colonel	Lieutenant colonel		Major		Captain		First lieutenant		Second lieutenant
United States Coast Guard
United States Coast Guard		Admiral	Vice admiral	Rear admiral	Rear admiral (lower half)	Captain	Commander		Lieutenant commander		Lieutenant		Lieutenant (junior grade)		Ensign
NATO code	OF-10	OF-9	OF-8	OF-7	OF-6	OF-5	OF-4		OF-3		OF-2		OF-1

== See also ==
- NATO
- Ranks and insignia of NATO
- Ranks and insignia of NATO armies enlisted
- Ranks and insignia of NATO armies officers
- Ranks and insignia of NATO air forces enlisted
- Ranks and insignia of NATO air forces officers
- Ranks and insignia of NATO navies enlisted
