= Comparative navy officer ranks of the Americas =

Rank comparison chart of navies of North and South American states.

== Officers ==
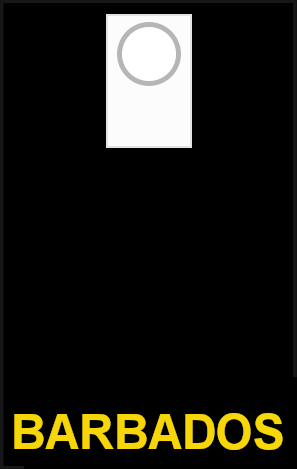
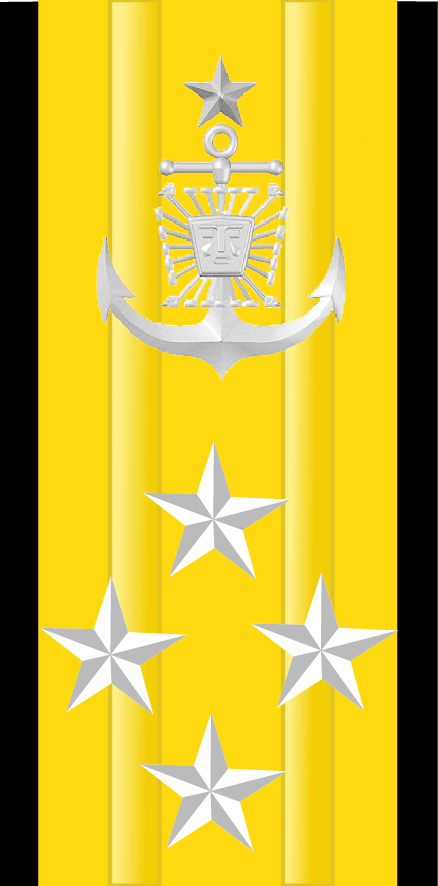
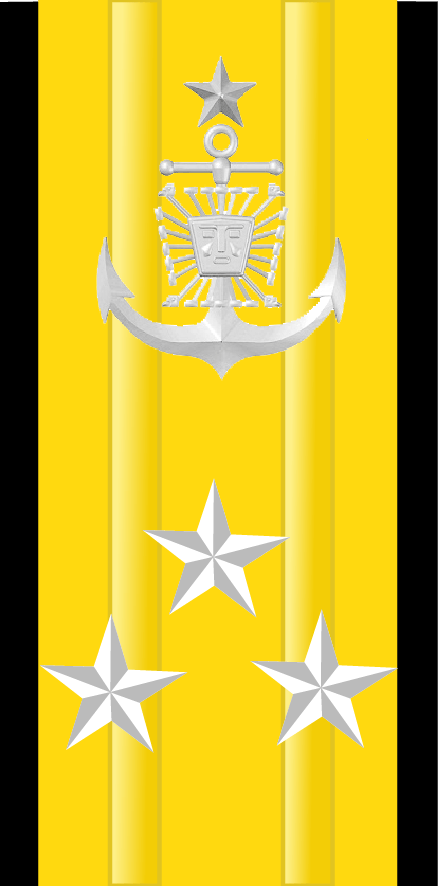
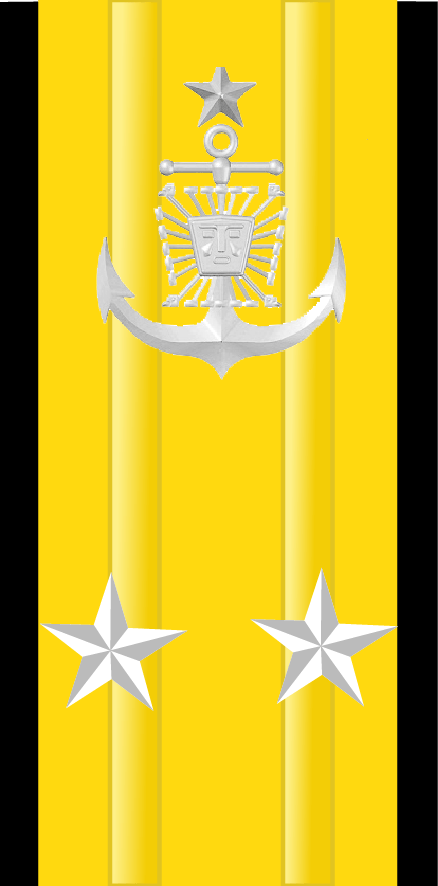
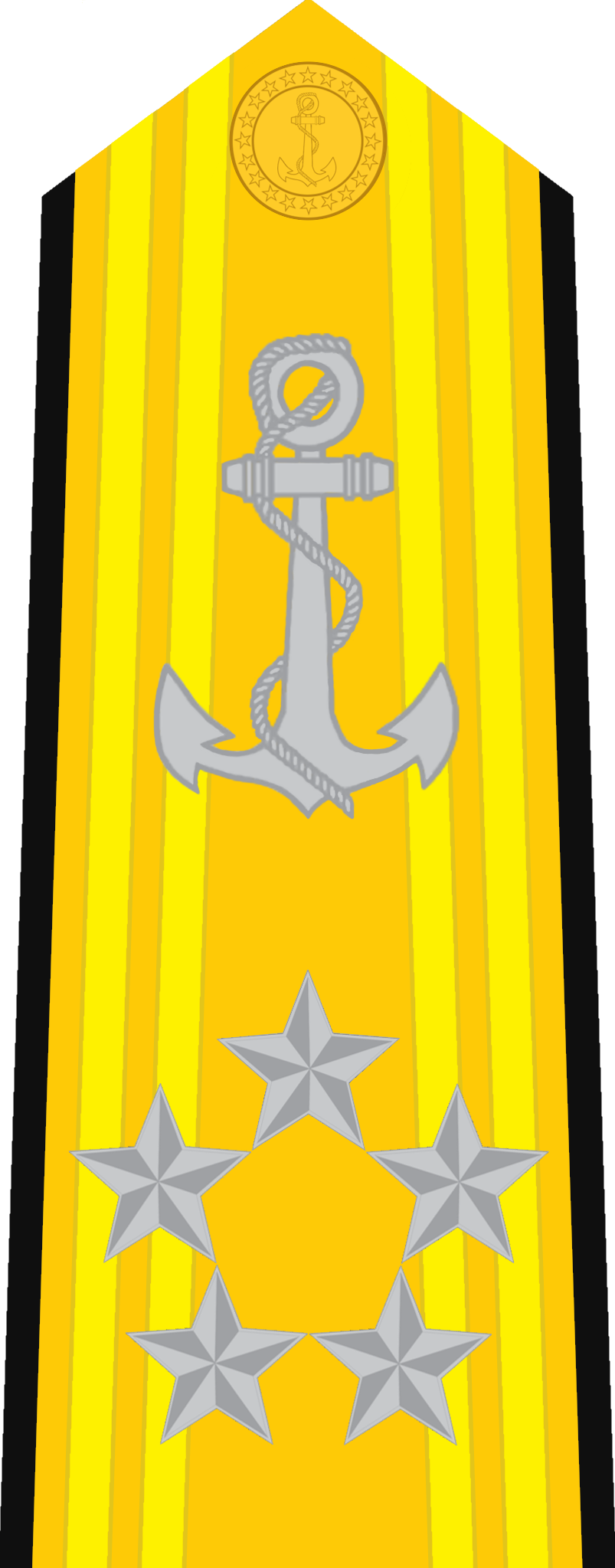
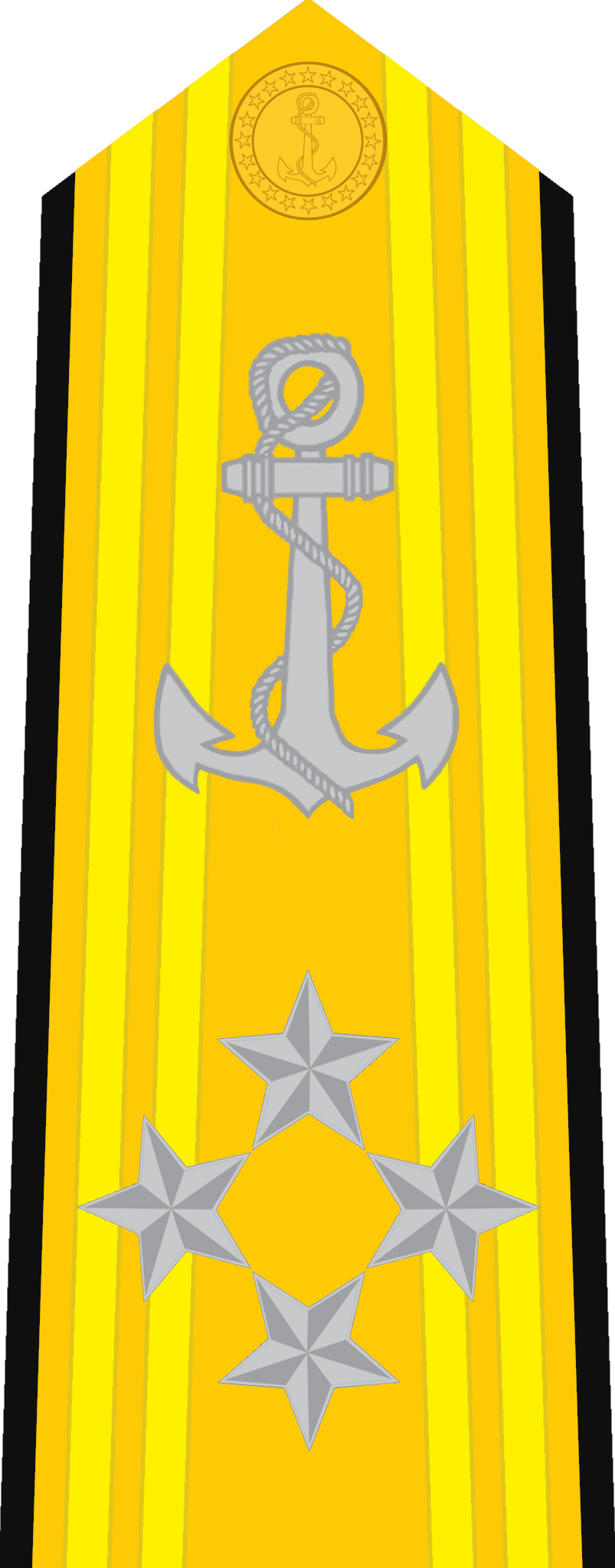
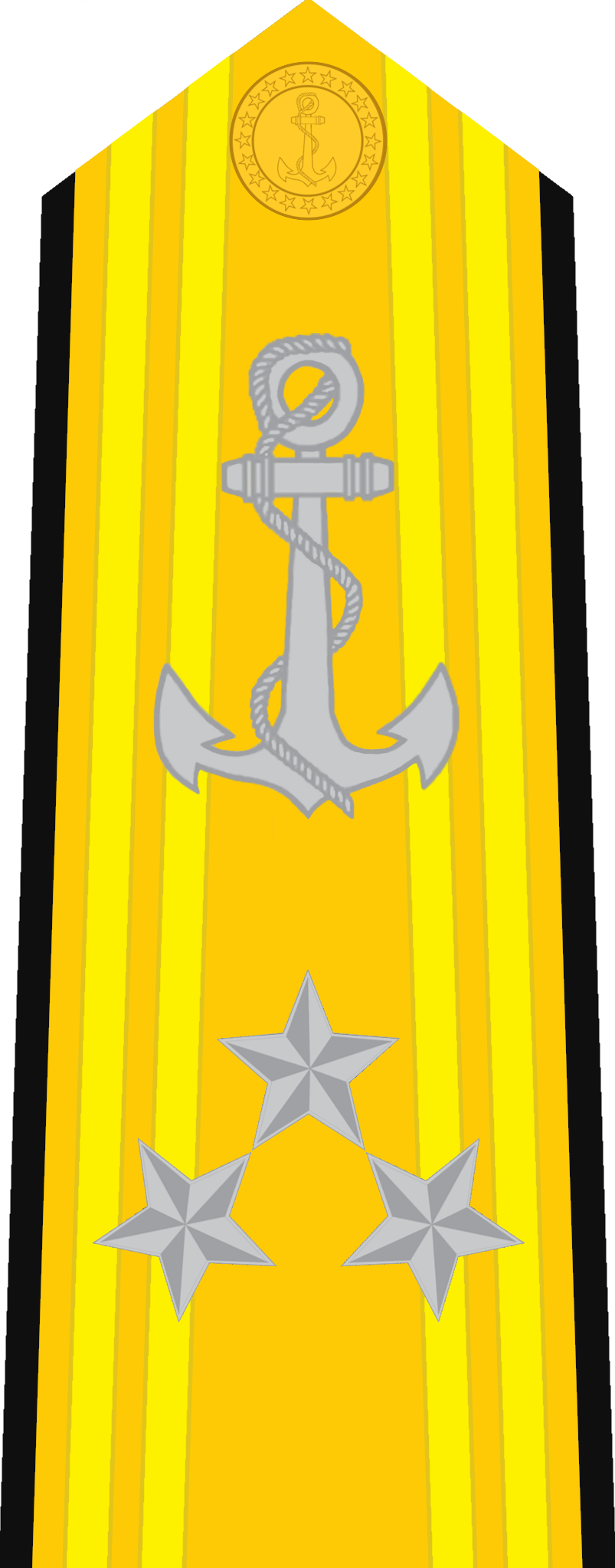
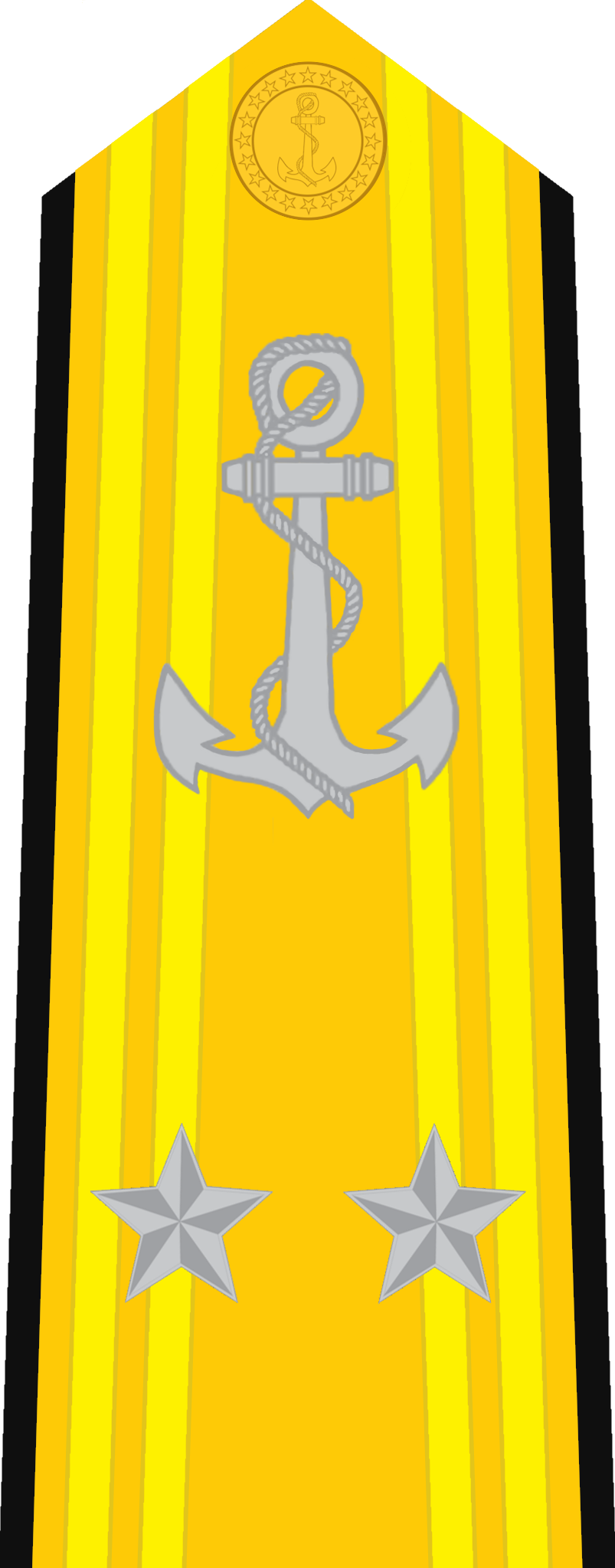
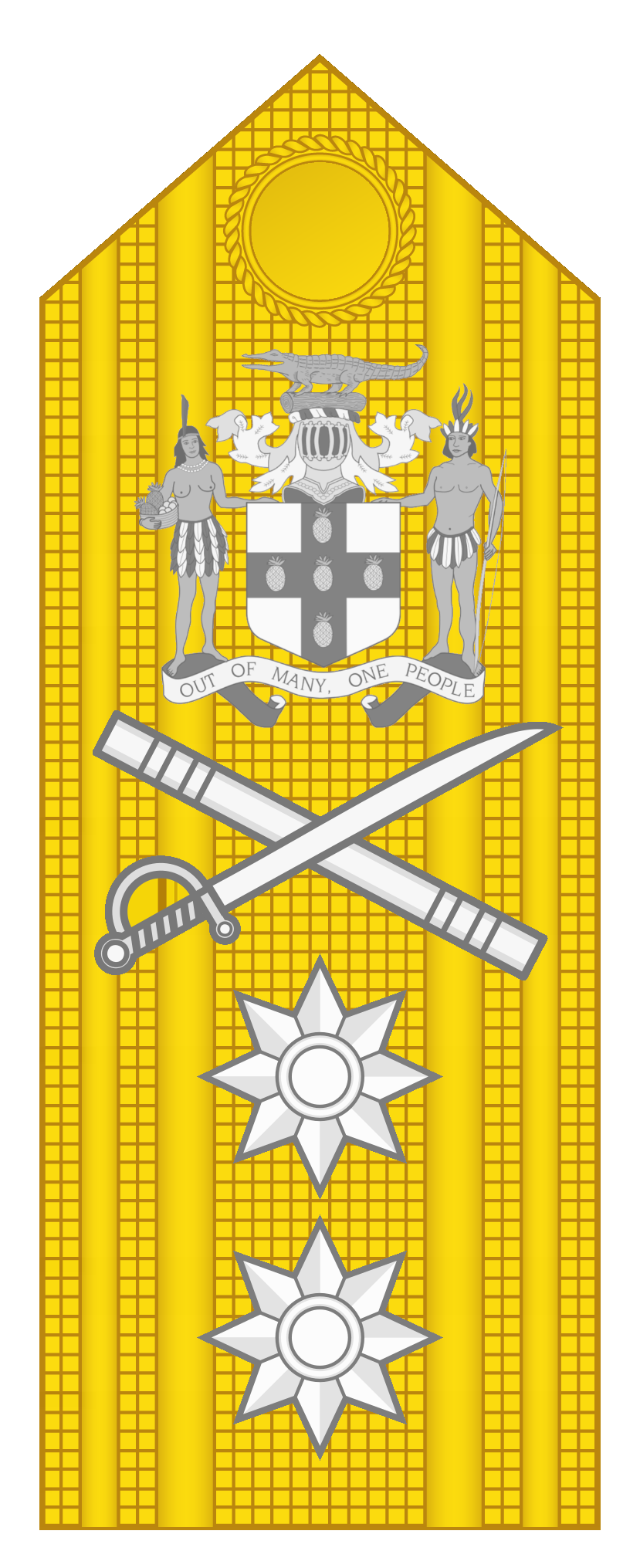
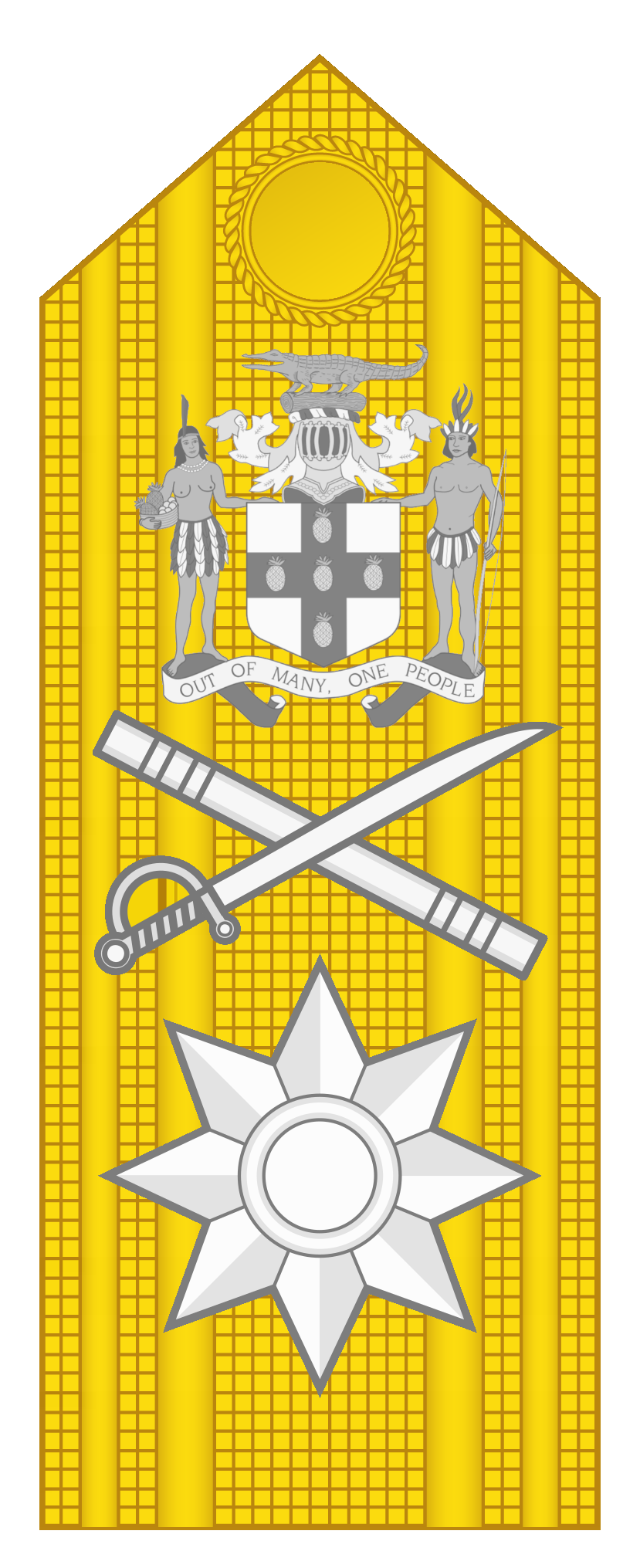
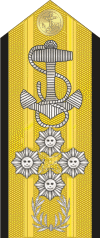
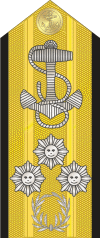
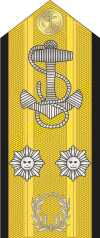
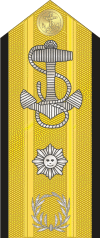
Rank group	General / flag officers					Senior officers					Junior officers
Antigua and Barbuda Coast Guard
Antigua and Barbuda Coast Guard						Captain		Commander		Lieutenant commander	Lieutenant		Lieutenant (junior grade)		Sub-lieutenant
Argentine Navy
Argentine Navy		Almirante	Vicealmirante	Contralmirante	Comodoro de marina	Capitán de navío		Capitán de fragata		Capitán de corbeta	Teniente de navío		Teniente de fragata	Teniente de corbeta	Guardiamarina
Royal Bahamas Defence Force
Royal Bahamas Defence Force					Commodore	Captain		Senior commander	Commander	Lieutenant commander	Senior lieutenant	Lieutenant	Sub-lieutenant		Acting sub-lieutenant
Barbados Coast Guard
Barbados Coast Guard				Rear admiral	Commodore	Captain		Commander		Lieutenant commander	Lieutenant		Sub lieutenant		Midshipman
Belize Coast Guard
Belize Coast Guard				Rear admiral	Rear admiral (lower half)	Captain		Commander		Lieutenant commander	Lieutenant		Lieutenant (junior grade)		Ensign
Bolivian Navy
Bolivian Navy		Almirante	Vicealmirante	Contraalmirante		Capitán de navío		Capitán de fragata		Capitán de corbeta	Teniente de navío		Teniente de fragata		Alférez
Brazilian Navy
Brazilian Navy	Almirante	Almirante de esquadra	Vice-almirante	Contra-almirante		Capitão de mar e guerra		Capitão de fragata		Capitão de corveta	Capitão-tenente		Primeiro-tenente		Segundo-tenente
Royal Canadian Navy
Royal Canadian Navy		Admiral	Vice-admiral	Rear-admiral	Commodore	Captain (N)		Commander		Lieutenant-commander	Lieutenant (N)		Sub-lieutenant		Acting sub-lieutenant
Royal Canadian Navy		Amiral(e)	Vice-amiral(e)	Contre-amiral(e)	Commodore	Capitaine de vaisseau		Capitaine de frégate		Capitaine de corvette	Lieutenant(e) de vaisseau		Enseigne de vaisseau de 1^{re} classe		Enseigne de vaisseau de 2^{e} classe
Chilean Navy
Chilean Navy		Almirante	Vicealmirante	Contraalmirante	Comodoro	Capitán de navío		Capitán de fragata		Capitán de corbeta	Teniente 1°		Teniente 2°	Subteniente	Guardiamarina
Colombian National Navy
Colombian National Navy		Almirante		Vicealmirante	Contralmirante	Capitán de navío		Capitán de fragata		Capitán de corbeta	Teniente de navío		Teniente de fragata		Teniente de corbeta
Rank group	General / flag officers					Senior officers					Junior officers
Costa Rica	No navy
Cuban Revolutionary Navy
Cuban Revolutionary Navy			Almirante	Vicealmirante	Contralmirante	Capitán de flotilla	Capitán de navío	Capitán de fragata		Capitán de corbeta	Teniente de navío		Teniente de fragata	Teniente de corbeta	Alférez
Dominica	No navy
Dominican Navy
Dominican Navy			Almirante	Vicealmirante	Contralmirante	Capitán de navío		Capitán de fragata		Capitán de corbeta	Teniente de navio		Teniente de fragata		Teniente de corbeta
Ecuadorian Navy
Ecuadorian Navy		Almirante	Vicealmirante	Contralmirante		Capitán de navío		Capitán de fragata		Capitán de corbeta	Teniente de navío		Teniente de fragata		Alferez de fragata
Navy of El Salvador
Navy of El Salvador		Almirante	Vicealmirante	Contralmirante	Comodoro	Capitán de navío		Capitán de fragata		Capitán de corbeta	Teniente de navío		Teniente de fragata		Teniente de corbeta
Grenada	No navy
Guatemalan Navy
Guatemalan Navy				Almirante	Vicealmirante	Capitán de navío		Capitán de fragata		Capitán de corbeta	Teniente de navio	Teniente de fragata	Alférez de navio		Alférez de fragata
Guyana Coast Guard
Guyana Coast Guard				Rear admiral	Commodore	Captain		Commander		Lieutenant commander	Lieutenant		Lieutenant junior grade		Sub-lieutenant
Haitian Navy
Honduran Navy
Honduran Navy				Vicealmirante	Contralmirante	Capitán de navío		Capitán de fragata		Capitán de corbeta	Teniente de navío		Teniente de fragata		Alferez de fragata
Jamaican Coast Guard
Jamaican Coast Guard			Vice admiral	Rear admiral	Commodore	Captain		Commander		Lieutenant commander	Lieutenant		Lieutenant (junior grade)		Sub-lieutenant
Mexican Navy
Mexican Navy		Secretario de Marina	Almirante	Vicealmirante	Contraalmirante	Capitán de navío		Capitán de fragata		Capitán de corbeta	Teniente de navio	Teniente de fragata	Teniente de corbeta		Guardiamarina
Rank group	General / flag officers					Senior officers					Junior officers
Nicaraguan Navy
Nicaraguan Navy			Almirante	Vicealmirante	Contralmirante	Capitán de navío		Capitán de fragata		Capitán de corbeta	Teniente de navío		Teniente de fragata	Teniente de corbeta	Alferez de fragata
Panama	No navy
Paraguayan Navy
Paraguayan Navy		Almirante	Vicealmirante	Contraalmirante		Capitán de navío		Capitán de fragata		Capitán de corbeta	Teniente de navio		Teniente de fragata	Teniente de corbeta	Guardiamarina
Peruvian Navy
Peruvian Navy	Gran Almirante del Perú	Almirante	Vicealmirante	Contraalmirante		Capitán de navío		Capitán de fragata		Capitán de corbeta	Teniente primero		Teniente segundo		Alférez de fragata
Saint Kitts and Nevis Coast Guard
Saint Kitts and Nevis Coast Guard								Commander		Lieutenant Commander	Lieutenant		Sub-Lieutenant		Midshipman
Saint Lucia	No navy
Saint Vincent and the Grenadines	No navy
Trinidad and Tobago Coast Guard
Trinidad and Tobago Coast Guard				Rear admiral	Commodore	Captain		Commander		Lieutenant commander	Lieutenant		Sub-lieutenant		Acting sub-lieutenant
United States Navy
United States Navy	Fleet admiral	Admiral	Vice admiral	Rear admiral	Rear admiral (lower half)	Captain		Commander		Lieutenant commander	Lieutenant		Lieutenant (junior grade)		Ensign
United States Coast Guard
United States Coast Guard		Admiral	Vice admiral	Rear admiral	Rear admiral (lower half)	Captain		Commander		Lieutenant commander	Lieutenant		Lieutenant (junior grade)		Ensign
United States Marine Corps
United States Marine Corps		General	Lieutenant general	Major general	Brigadier general	Colonel		Lieutenant colonel		Major	Captain		First lieutenant		Second lieutenant
National Navy of Uruguay
National Navy of Uruguay		Almirante		Contraalmirante		Capitán de navío		Capitán de fragata		Capitán de corbeta	Teniente de navío		Alférez de navio	Alférez de fragata	Guardiamarina
Bolivarian Navy of Venezuela
Bolivarian Navy of Venezuela		Almirante en jefe	Almirante	Vicealmirante	Contraalmirante	Capitán de navío		Capitán de fragata		Capitán de corbeta	Teniente de navío		Teniente de fragata		Teniente de corbeta
Rank group	General / flag officers					Senior officers					Junior officers

== See also ==
- Comparative navy officer ranks of Asia
- Comparative navy officer ranks of Europe
- Ranks and insignia of NATO navies officers
