= Oberleutnant zur See =

German naval rank

- shoulder board / cuff title / mounting loop
- Country: Germany
- Service branch: German Navy
- Abbreviation: OLt zS
- NATO rank code: OF-1
- Formation: 1898
- Next higher rank: Kapitänleutnant
- Next lower rank: Leutnant zur See
- Equivalent ranks: Oberleutnant

Oberleutnant zur See (OLt zS or OLZS in the German Navy, Oblt.z.S. in the Kriegsmarine) is traditionally the highest rank of Lieutenant in the German Navy. It is grouped as OF-1 in NATO.

The rank was introduced in the Imperial German Navy by renaming the former rank of Premier Lieutenant in 1890. Within the navy, officers of this rank were simply addressed as Herr Oberleutnant. To distinguish naval officers from those of the army, the suffix zur See (at sea) was added in official communications, sometimes shortened to z.S. (Oblt.z.S.). The rank has since been used by the Reichsmarine, Kriegsmarine, and Bundesmarine. In the Volksmarine, the rank was originally used in the same way until the suffix zur See was dropped. In the Kriegsmarine, engineers (Ingenieur – Ing.) of the same rank were distinguished as Oberleutnant (Ing.).

junior rank Leutnant zur See	(German officer rank); Oberleutnant zur See	senior rank Kapitänleutnant

== See also ==
- Ranks of the German Bundeswehr
- Rank insignia of the German Bundeswehr
