= Leutnant zur See =

Naval officer rank

Leutnant zur See is the lowest officer rank in the German Navy. Comparable ranks European navies are: Belgium Navy - Luitenant-ter-zee (LTZ), Dutch - Luitenant-ter-zee.

== Belgium ==
| NATO code | OF-3 | OF-2 |
|---|---|---|
| Insignia | | |
| Flemish | Luitenant-ter-zee 1ste klasse | Luitenant-ter-zee |
| Belgian French | Lieutenant de vaisseau de 1^{re} classe | Lieutenant de vaisseau |
| German | Linienschiffsleutnant 1. klasse | Linienschiffsleutnant |

== Germany ==
Lieutenant at sea Leutnant zur See
- Shoulder board / cuff title / mounting loop
- Country: Germany
- Service branch: German Navy
- Abbreviation: LZS
- NATO rank code: OF-1
- Formation: 1890
- Next higher rank: Oberleutnant zur See
- Next lower rank: Oberstabsbootsmann
- Equivalent ranks: Leutnant (Army & Air force)

Leutnant zur See (Lt zS or LZS) is the lowest officer rank in the German Navy, grouped as OF1 in NATO.

The rank was introduced in the German Imperial Navy by renaming the former rank of Sekonde Lieutenant in 1890. In navy context officers of this rank were simply addressed as Herr Leutnant. To distinguish naval officers from officers of the army, the suffix zur See (at sea) was added in official communication, sometimes shortened to z.S. or Lt.z.S. The rank has since been used by the Reichsmarine, the Kriegsmarine and the German Navy. In the Volksmarine the rank was originally used in the same way until the suffix zur See was dropped.

== Netherlands ==
| NATO code | OF-3 | OF-2 | OF-1 | |
|---|---|---|---|---|
| Insignia | | | | |
| Dutch | Luitenant ter zee der 1^{ste} klasse | Luitenant ter zee der 2^{de} klasse oudste categorie | Luitenant ter zee der 2^{de} klasse | Luitenant ter zee der 3^{de} klasse |

== See also ==
- Lieutenant (navy)
- Ranks and insignia of officers of NATO navies

== Bibliography ==
- Showell, Jak P. Mallmann (2002) [1999]. German Navy Handbook 1939–1945. Stroud, UK: Sutton Publishing. ISBN 0-7509-3205-8.
