= Gardes de la Marine =

Junior naval officer rank

Gardes de la Marine is a junior officer rank, usually used in American navies, as well as a former rank used in France.

== France ==
In France, under the Ancien Régime, the Gardes de la Marine (Guards of the Navy), or Gardes-Marine were young gentlemen undergoing training to be naval officers. The training program was established by Cardinal Richelieu in 1670 and lasted until Admiral Charles Eugène Gabriel de La Croix abolished it in 1786.

The Gardes-Marine received a brevet commission from the King and were organized into companies, established at the harbors of Brest, Toulon, and Rochefort. All naval officers were drawn from these companies, which were the equivalent of the current naval school.

The king paid schoolmasters to instruct the Gardes-Marine in everything they needed to know to be good officers - there were masters in mathematics, drawing, writing, fortification, naval architecture and construction, dance, hydrography, fencing, etc.

The Gardes-Marine sailed on the king's ships, on which they served as soldiers, and trained in all roles on board. At sea they honed the skills they had learned ashore. Their training, in cooperation with the captain of the vessel, included four hours intended for their different exercises. The first hour was in piloting and hydrography, the second for musketry and military manoeuvres, the third for cannon exercise, the fourth one for training in steering a ship, if time allowed, supervised by the captain or second in command, done by each of the gardes in turn.

== Gallery ==
Guardiamarina
(Argentine Navy)

Guarda-marinha
(Brazilian Navy)

Guarda-marinha
(Cape Verdean Coast Guard)

Guardiamarina
(Chilean Navy)

Guardiamarina
(Mexican Navy)

Guardiamarina
(Paraguayan Navy)

Guardiamarina
(National Navy of Uruguay)
