= Junior lieutenant =

Military rank

Junior lieutenant is a junior officer rank in several countries, comparable to Sub-lieutenant.

== Germany ==
In East Germany's National People's Army, the rank of Unterleutnant (lit. 'Under-lieutenant') was introduced in 1956 and used until German reunification in 1990.

== Eastern Europe ==
In many Eastern European countries, the rank of junior lieutenant is used.

=== Russia ===
The rank of Junior lieutenant (Russian: Mла́дший лейтена́нт, romanized: Mládshiy leytenánt) was introduced into the Russian military in 1937.

== Junior lieutenant insignia ==
=== Army insignia ===
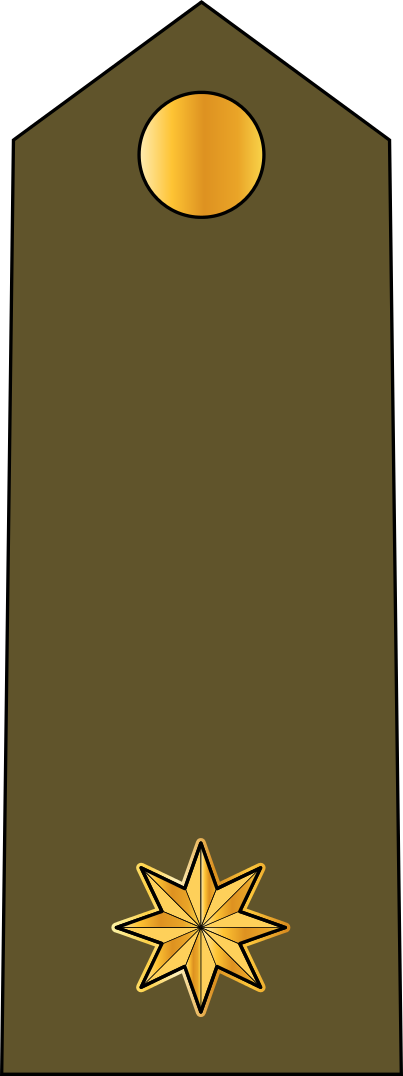
Kiçik leytenant
(Azerbaijani Land Forces)

Малодшы лейтэнант
Malodšy liejtenant
(Belarusian Ground Forces)

Leftenan muda
(Royal Brunei Land Force)

Кенже лейтенант
Kenje leytenant
(Kyrgyz Army)

Leftenan muda
(Malaysian Army)

Mла́дший лейтена́нт
Mládshiy leytenánt
(Russian Ground Forces)

Лейтенанти хурд
Leytenanti xurd
(Tajik Ground Forces)

Kiçi leýtenant
(Turkmen Ground Forces)

Молодший лейтенант
Molodshyy leytenant
(Ukrainian Ground Forces and Ukrainian Air Assault Forces)

=== Navy insignia ===
Kiçik leytenant
(Azerbaijani Navy)

Leftenan muda
(Royal Brunei Navy)

Leftenan muda
(Royal Malaysian Navy)

Младший лейтенант
Mladshiy leytenant
( Russian Navy)

Kiçi leýtenant
(Turkmen Naval Forces)

Молодший лейтенант
Molodshyy leytenant
(Ukrainian Navy)

=== Other branches and non-military services ===
Молодший лейтенант поліції
Molodshyy leytenant politsii
(National Police of Ukraine)

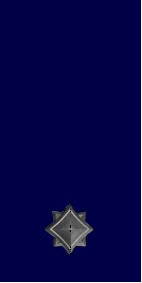
Молодший лейтенант ДСНС
Molodshyy leytenant DSNS
(State Emergency Service of Ukraine)

== See also ==
- Podporuchik
