= Flotilla admiral =

Military rank

Flotilla admiral is the lowest flag rank, a rank above captain, in the modern navies of Belgium, Bulgaria, Denmark, Finland, Germany, Latvia, Lithuania and Sweden. It corresponds to the rank of commodore in the navies of the United Kingdom and certain other countries or rear admiral (lower half) in the navy of the United States.

== Germany ==
Flottillenadmiral, short FltlAdm in lists FADM, (en: Flotilla admiral) is the lowest flag officer rank in the German Navy, corresponding to command of a US Navy Rear Admiral (lower half) or Commodore (Royal Navy). It is equivalent to Brigadegeneral in the Bundeswehr or to Admiralarzt/Generalarzt, Admiralapotheker/Generalapotheker in the Zentraler Sanitätsdienst der Bundeswehr.

Its rank insignia, worn on the sleeves and shoulders, are one five-pointed star above a big gold stripe and a narrow one (without the star when rank loops are worn). It is grade B6 in the pay rules of the Federal Ministry of Defence.

The sequence of ranks (top-down approach) in that particular group is as follows:

- OF-9: Admiral (Germany) / General (Germany)
- OF-8: Vizeadmiral / Generalleutnant
- OF-7: Konteradmiral / Generalmajor
- OF-6: Flottillenadmiral / Brigadegeneral

== Gallery ==
Flottieljeadmiraal
(Belgian Navy)

Флотилен адмирал
Flotilen admiral
(Bulgarian Navy)

Flotilleadmiral
(Royal Danish Navy)

Lippueamiraali
Flottiljamiral
(Finnish Navy)

Flottillenadmiral
(German Navy)

Flotiles admirālis
(Latvian Naval Forces)

Flotilės admirolas
(Lithuanian Naval Force)

Flottiljamiral
(Royal Swedish Navy)
