= Mereväekapten =

Estonian military rank

- The insignia of an Estonian Navy captain
- Country: Republic of Estonia
- Service branch: Estonian Navy
- Abbreviation: m-kpt
- Rank group: senior officer
- Rank: Captain
- NATO rank code: OF-5
- Next higher rank: kommodoor
- Next lower rank: kaptenleitnant
- Equivalent ranks: kolonel (Estonian Army, Estonian Air Force)

Mereväekapten (Captain; from Low German: kaptein) is the senior-most senior officer rank in the Estonian Navy. In Estonia, the rank of captain is usually that of the Chief of the Navy and other senior officers or employees in the field of defence, including in the Foreign Service (such as the Defence Attaché). The rank of captain, as of any other officer, is granted by the President of the Republic of Estonia on the proposal of the Commander of the Defense Forces.
