= Captain lieutenant =

Naval military rank

Captain lieutenant or captain-lieutenant is a military rank used in a number of navies worldwide and formerly in the British Army.

== Northern Europe ==
=== Denmark, Norway and Finland ===
The same rank is used in the navies of Denmark (kaptajnløjtnant), Norway (kapteinløytnant) and Finland (Finnish: kapteeniluutnantti; Swedish: kaptenlöjtnant).

In Denmark and Norway, the higher rank is Ship-of-the-line captain (Danish: orlogskaptajn; Norwegian: orlogskaptein), and the lower rank is First lieutenant (premierløjtnant) in Denmark and Lieutenant (løytnant) in Norway.

The rank was also used in the Royal Danish Army between 1923 and 1962.

=== Estonia ===
In the Estonian Navy the similarly sounding rank of kaptenleitnant is an officer rank classified as NATO OF-4, i.e. equal to commander in the Royal Navy and United States Navy.

=== Sweden ===
A captain lieutenant (kaptenlöjtnant) was in Sweden an officer standing between captain and lieutenant, who commanded one of the companies, which actually had the regimental commander, lieutenant colonel or major as officer commanding. In 1750, the rank title of captain lieutenant was replaced by that of staff captain, whose number, when the rank of second major (sekundmajor) was established in 1757, became four in each infantry regiment. The rank was abolished in 1833.

== France ==
The French Army of the Ancien Régime used a rank of capitaine-lieutenant very similar to the British one. It was mostly encountered in the Royal Guard (maison militaire du roi), where the king was officially captain of most of the guard companies, but the effective command was in the hands of a captain-lieutenant. D'Artagnan is perhaps the most famous captain-lieutenant in French history, as commander of the first mousquetaire company.

== Germany ==
Kapitänleutnant is an OF2 rank equivalent to the Hauptmann (en: Captain) in the German Army and the German Air Force.

== Netherlands ==
In the Royal Netherlands Navy, a kapitein-luitenant ter zee is equivalent to a US Navy or Royal Navy commander (OF-4).

== Portugal and Brazil ==
In the Portuguese Navy, as well as in most of the other Community of Portuguese Language Countries navies, a capitão-tenente is the equivalent naval rank to a British or US lieutenant commander (OF-3). The rank was introduced in the Portuguese Navy in the late 17th century. It was equivalent to an Army lieutenant colonel until the introduction of the rank of frigate captain in 1782 and, from then on, it became equivalent to an Army major.

The Brazilian Navy uses the rank of capitão-tenente as the equivalent to the British and US lieutenant (OF-2). Until the introduction of the rank of corvette captain in 1906, the Brazilian Navy followed the Portuguese model of a capitão-tenente being an equivalent of an Army major.

== Slavophone armed forces ==
=== Russia ===
Kapitan-leytenant (Russian: капитан-лейтенант) is a rank in the Russian Navy, previously the Red Fleet/Soviet Navy and Imperial Russian Navy. It is the rank below a captain of the 3rd rank and above a senior lieutenant. In Soviet times, it could be achieved as early as an officer's 5th year of service. In Russian and other East-European navies it is the most senior junior officer rank (equivalent to "captain" in the Army/Ground Forces).

The Russian Navy assigns this rank the two-and-a-half stripe insignia used in Britain and the US for lieutenant commanders. On the other hand, the US Navy considers this rank equivalent to lieutenant.

In terms of responsibilities, officers of this rank may serve as department heads on larger warships, but may also serve as commanding officers of 3rd and 4th rank warships (Russian ship classifications referring to all from Krivak-class frigates to gunboats and minesweepers).

Unlike the equivalent OF2-rank Kapitänleutnant in the German Navy, submarines are at least nominally not on the list of eligible positions. In the past, when the boats were smaller, captain-lieutenants were eligible for the submarine command. However, in current Russian ship ranking no modern submarine is given 3rd rank. This reflects the high status of submarines, as all nuclear submarines (SSBN or SSN) are considered 1st rank and large and medium diesels 2nd rank, while smaller 3rd rank submarines simply aren't built.

Rank insignia IRA, Soviet Navy, RF Navy

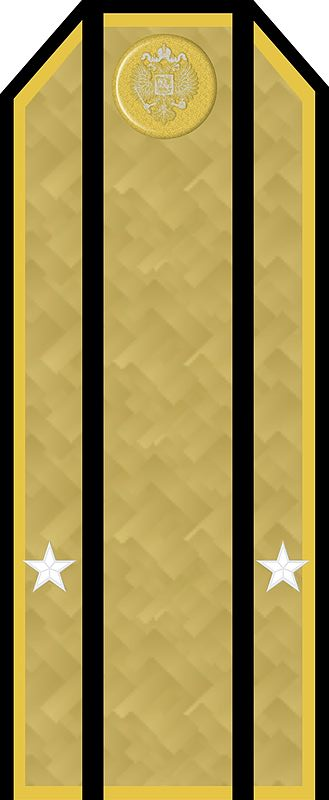
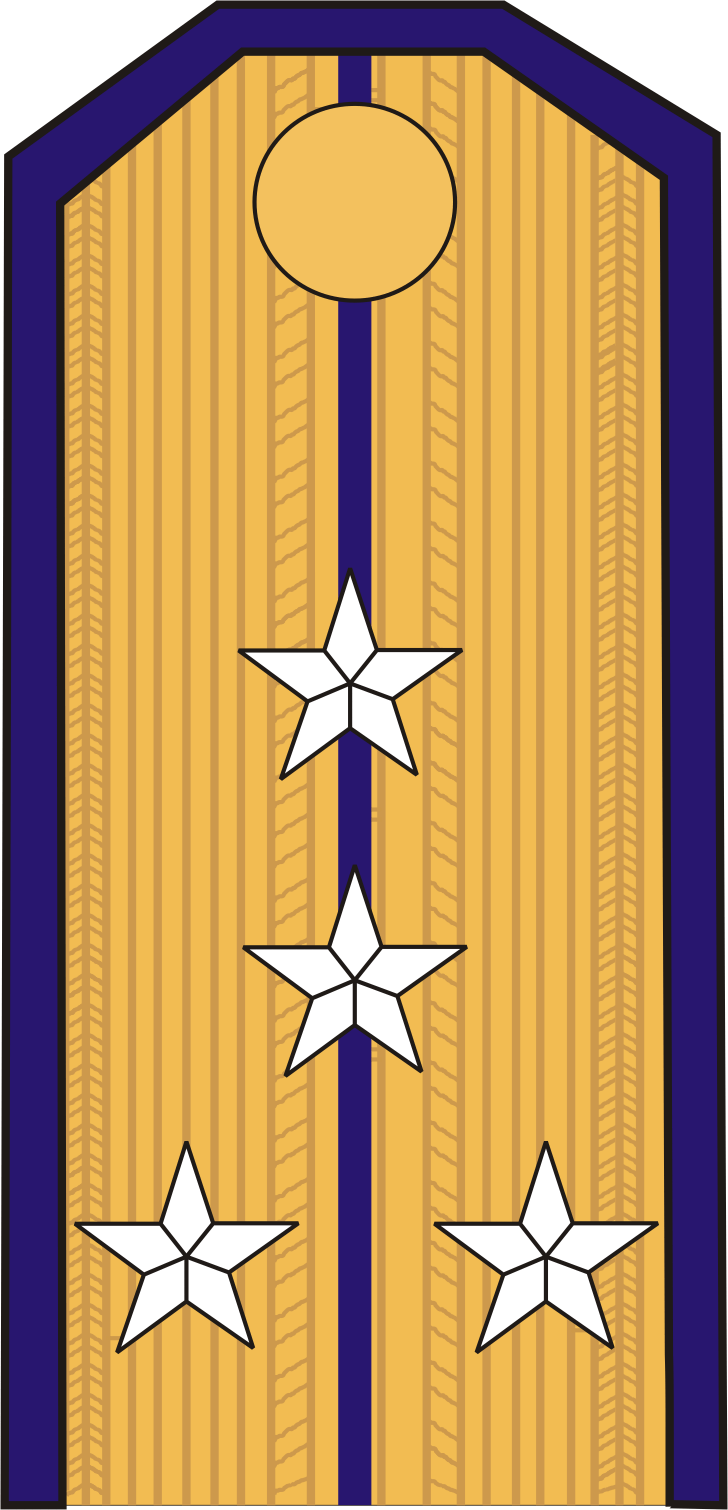
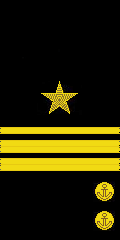
Kapitan-leytenant
shoulder board (1703–1911)	shoulder board (1943–1955)	shoulder board (1955–1991)	... everyday uniform	shoulder board / sleeve insignia (after 2010)

=== Ukrainian Navy ===
Captain-lieutenant (Ukrainian: капітан-лейтенант) is a rank in the Ukrainian Navy. These are equivalent to captain (OF-2) in Army.

The armed forces of Ukraine, formed during the collapse of the USSR, adopted the Soviet model of military ranks, as well as the Soviet marks of distinction. For the distinguishing marks, the captain-lieutenant had three tapes (two medium tapes, one above narrow one) on the sleeve, and chains of one lumen on which four small five-pointed stars were placed.

On 5 July 2016, the President of Ukraine approves the "Uniform Design and Signs of the Distinction of the Armed Forces of Ukraine". The draft includes, among other things, military ranks and distinguishing marks for military personnel. The marks of the distinction of servicemen are changing, departing from the Soviet standard.

20 November 2017 issued by the order of the Ministry of Defense of Ukraine No. 606, which specifies the rules for wearing and using uniform insignia by military personnel. The distinguishing marks of the captain-lieutenant became three stripes (two middle ones, one narrow one among which). The distinguishing marks are placed on both the sleeves and on the coats.

Rank insignia UA Navy

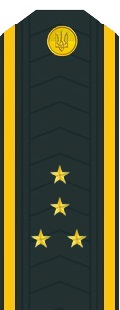
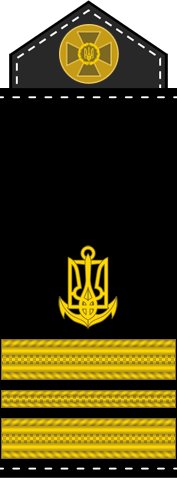
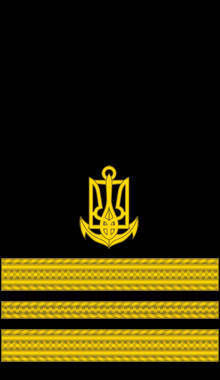
Captain-Lieutenant
shoulder board (1995–2016)	shoulder board / sleeve insignia (after 2016)

== United Kingdom ==
Captain-lieutenant was formerly a rank in the British Army; the senior subaltern rank, above lieutenant and below captain.

A regiment's field officers – its colonel, lieutenant colonel and major – originally commanded their own companies, as well as carrying out their regimental command duties.

However, from the 17th century onwards, the colonel increasingly became a patron and ceremonial head instead of an actual tactical commander, with command in the field devolving to the lieutenant colonel. This left the colonel's company without a captain.

The lieutenant of this company thus became its acting captain. This state of affairs was formally recognised with the creation of the rank of captain-lieutenant, with its own entry in the table of prices for the purchase of commissions.

In 1772 captain-lieutenants were granted rank as captains in their regiments and in the Army. The rank was abolished sometime in the early 19th century in almost all regiments.

The King's Company of the Grenadier Guards remains under the personal command of the monarch, currently King Charles III, with the rank of Captain-Lieutenant held by a Major within the company. In practice, he is referred to as "The Captain" and acts as a Company Commander. In a similar fashion, his deputy is referred to as "The Second Captain" rather than Company Second-in-Command.

== NATO code ==
NATO code	Country	English equivalent
OF-4	Estonia, Netherlands	Commander
OF-3	Portugal	Lieutenant commander
OF-2	Albania, Bulgaria, Denmark, Finland, Germany, Latvia, Lithuania, Norway	Lieutenant

== Gallery ==
Kapiten leitnant
(Albanian Navy)

Kapitan-leytenant
(Azerbaijani Navy)

Capitão-tenente
(Brazilian Navy)

Капитан-лейтенант
Kapitan-leytenant
(Bulgarian Navy)

Kaptajnløjtnant
(Royal Danish Navy)

Kaptenleitnant
(Estonian Navy)

Kapteeniluutnantti
Swedish: Kaptenlöjtnant
(Finnish Navy)

Kapitänleutnant
(German Navy)

Capitão-tenente
(Navy of Guinea-Bissau)

Капитан-лейтенант
Kapïtan-leytenant
(Kazakh Naval Forces)

Kapteiņleitnants
(Latvian Naval Forces)

Kapitonas leitenantas
(Lithuanian Naval Force)

Capitão-tenente
(Mozambique Naval Command)

Kapitein-luitenant ter zee
(Royal Netherlands Navy)

Kapteinløytnant
(Royal Norwegian Navy)

Capitão-tenente
(Portuguese Navy)

Капитан-лейтенант
Kapitan-leytenant
(Russian Navy)

Capitão-tenente
(Coast Guard of São Tomé and Príncipe)

Capitão-tenente
(East Timor Navy)

Kapitan-leýtenant
(Turkmen Naval Forces)

Капітан-лейтенант
Kapitan-leytenant
(Ukrainian Navy)

Kapitan-leytenant
(Uzbek River Force)
