= Military ranks and insignia of Bosnia and Herzegovina =

The Military rank system and military insignia of Bosnia and Herzegovina shows the military rank system and insignias used by the Army of the Republic of Bosnia and Herzegovina that existed from 1992 to 1996, the Army of the Federation of Bosnia and Herzegovina that existed from 1996 to 2006, and the current Armed Forces of Bosnia-Herzegovina, created in 2006. The ranks are defined in Articles 155 through 158 of the Law on Service in the Armed Forces of Bosnia-Herzegovina.

== Current ranks ==
As a result of the Dayton Agreement, a defense reform led in 2006 to the formation of the unified Armed Forces of Bosnia and Herzegovina which saw new military ranks and insignia in appearance and style, visually distinct from both the Army of the Federation of Bosnia and Herzegovina and insignia used by Republika Srpska.

=== Commissioned officer ranks ===
The rank insignia of commissioned officers.

Rank group	General / flag officers			Senior officers			Junior officers
Bosnian Ground Forces
Bosnian Ground Forces	General pukovnik	General major	Brigadni general	Brigadir	Pukovnik	Major	Kapetan	Poručnik	Podporučnik
Equivalent NATO code (Note: While Bosnia and Herzegovina is not a member of NATO, it does have an official conversion.)	OF-8	OF-7	OF-6	OF-5	OF-4	OF-3	OF-2	OF-1

=== Other ranks ===
The rank insignia of non-commissioned officers and enlisted personnel.

Rank group	Senior NCOs					Junior NCOs	Enlisted
Bosnian Ground Forces
Bosnian Ground Forces	Zastavnik 1 klase	Zastavnik	Stariji vodnik 1 klase	Stariji vodnik	Vodnik	Kaplar	Vojnik 1 klase	Vojnik
Equivalent NATO code	OR-9	OR-8	OR-7	OR-6	OR-5	OR-4/3	OR-2	OR-1

== Historical ranks ==
During the formation of the Army of the Republic of Bosnia and Herzegovina, rank insignia were to be worn on the shoulders, sleeve and cap; later on, on the shoulders and the left side of the chest. Ranks spanned from Private to Army general.

The first rank system in the Army of the Republic of Bosnia and Herzegovina was standardized at the beginning of August 1992. The following ranks were introduced: Private first class and Corporal for the enlisted; Sergeant, Sergeant first class, Warrant officer and Chief warrant officer for non-commissioned officers; Lieutenant, Captain, Colonel and Brigadier for commissioned officers; Brigadier general, Divisional general and Army general for general ranks.

Appropriate insignia and duties for the ranks were also regulated, along with the appearance and stylisation which were based on the adopted state and army symbols and insignia. Since the immediate implementation of officer training was delayed, this rank system remained unused.

However, in July 1993, a new system was introduced, defined as "wartime ranks", in which changes were made to the gradation of non-commissioned (Staff sergeant and Master sergeant) and commissioned officers (Senior lieutenant, Senior captain, Major and Brigadier). The appearance and stylisation remained similar to the previous system and were based on the army insignia, and the colors of the state symbols. By the end of 1993, this process of officer gradation was implemented, with 9,007 commissioned and 8,669 non-commissioned officers having been appointed.

Following the signing of the Washington Agreement on March 18, 1994 and the subsequent creation of the Federation of Bosnia and Herzegovina, the Army of the Republic of Bosnia and Herzegovina along with the Croatian Defence Council were integrated into the newly formed Army of the Federation of Bosnia and Herzegovina. As a result, a new rank system, appearance and stylisation was introduced.

=== Special insignia ===
The rank insignia of members of the Presidency and members of the Ministry of Defense.

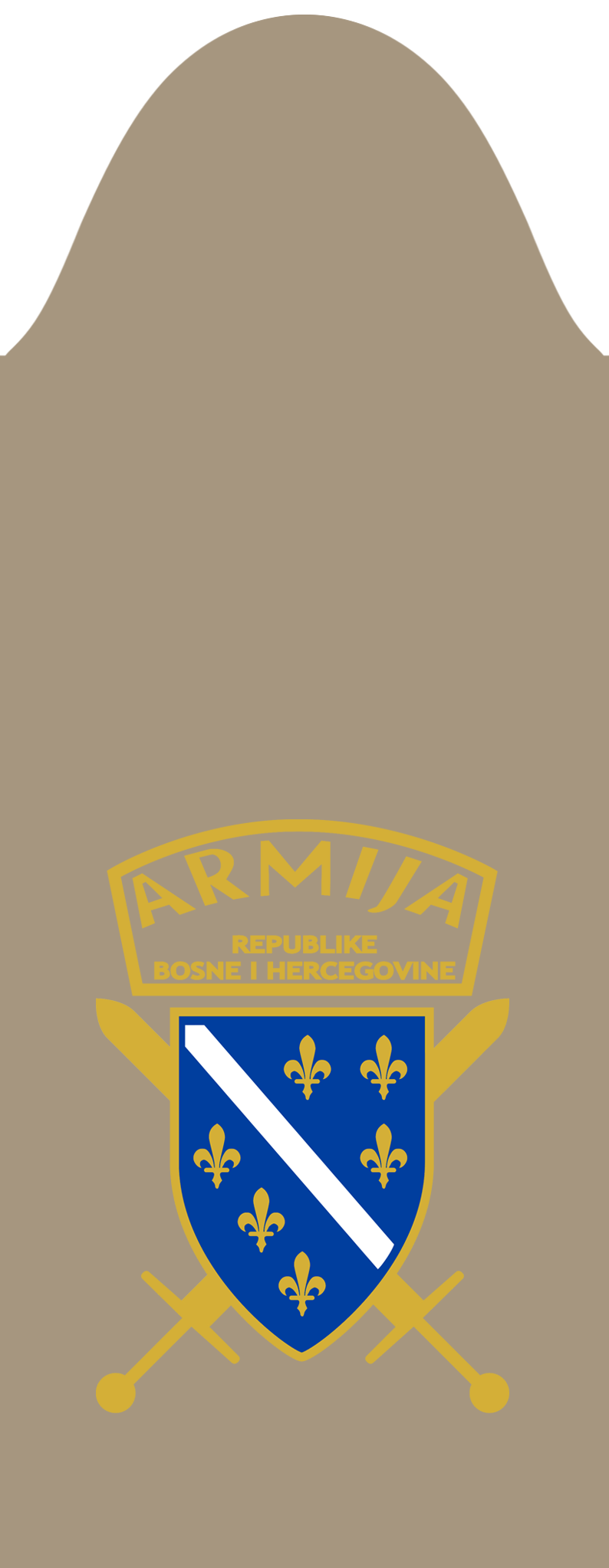
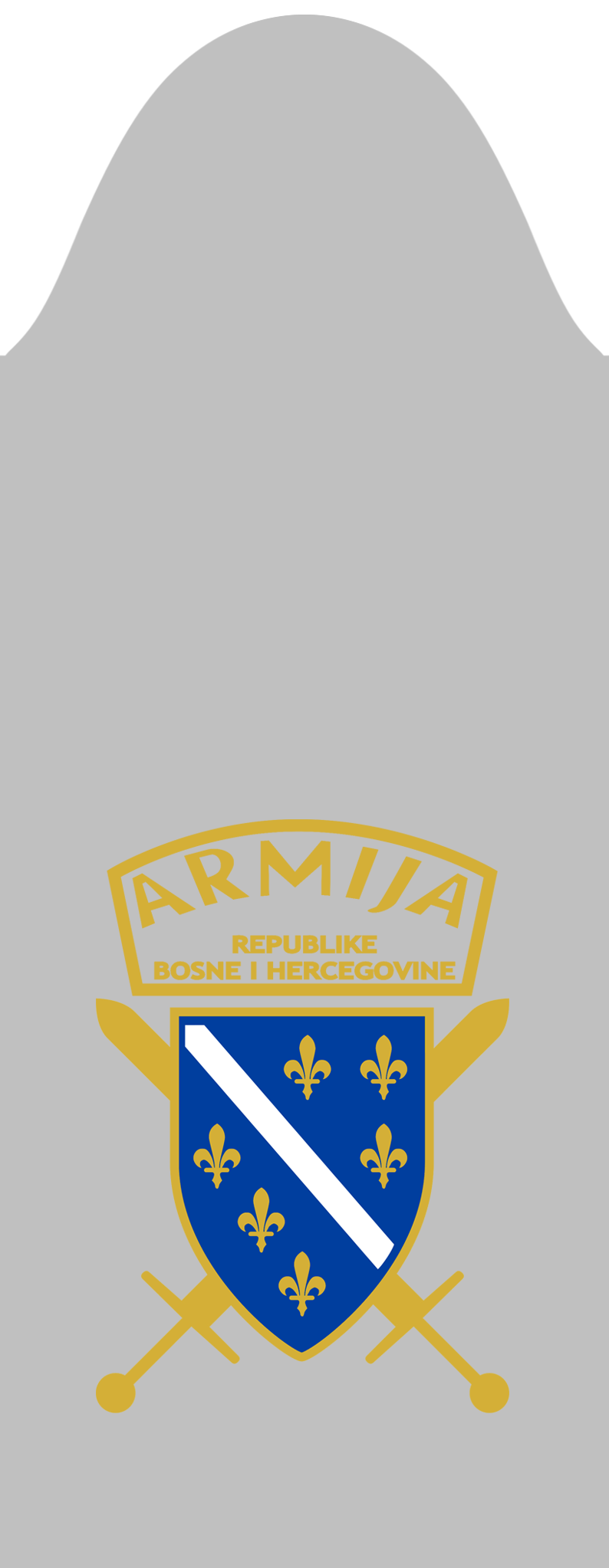
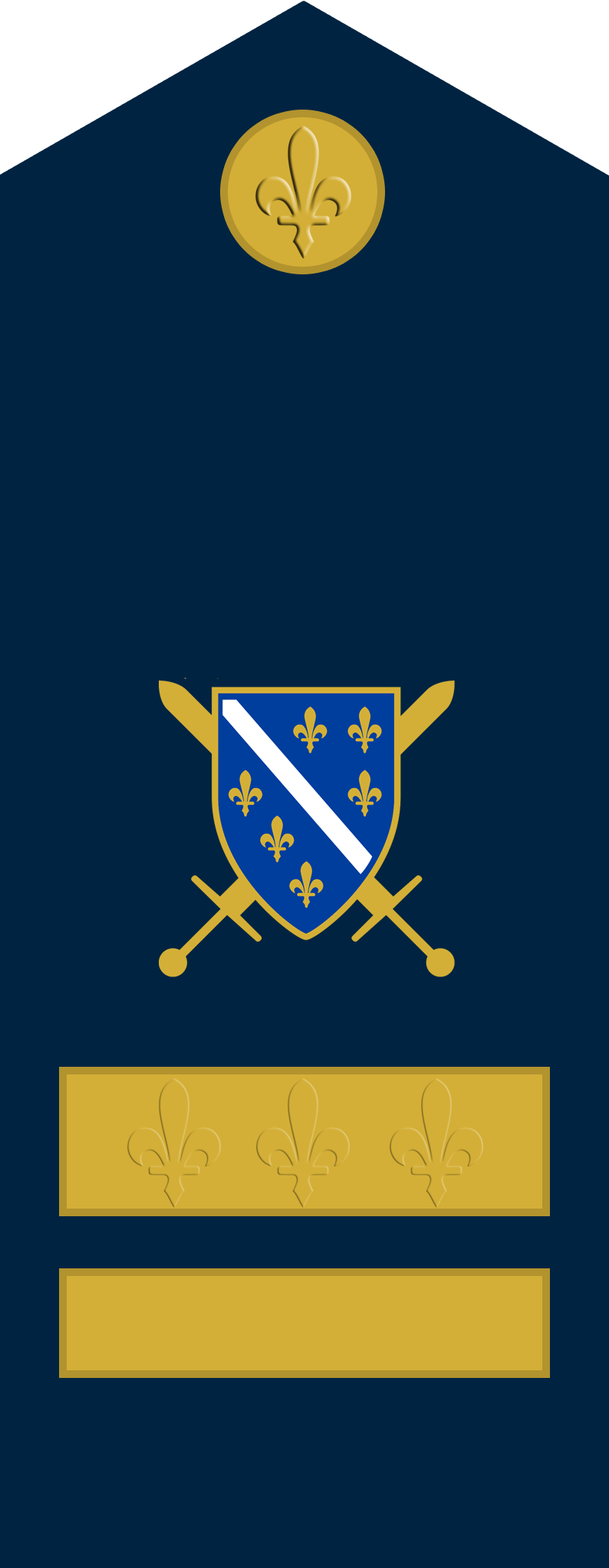
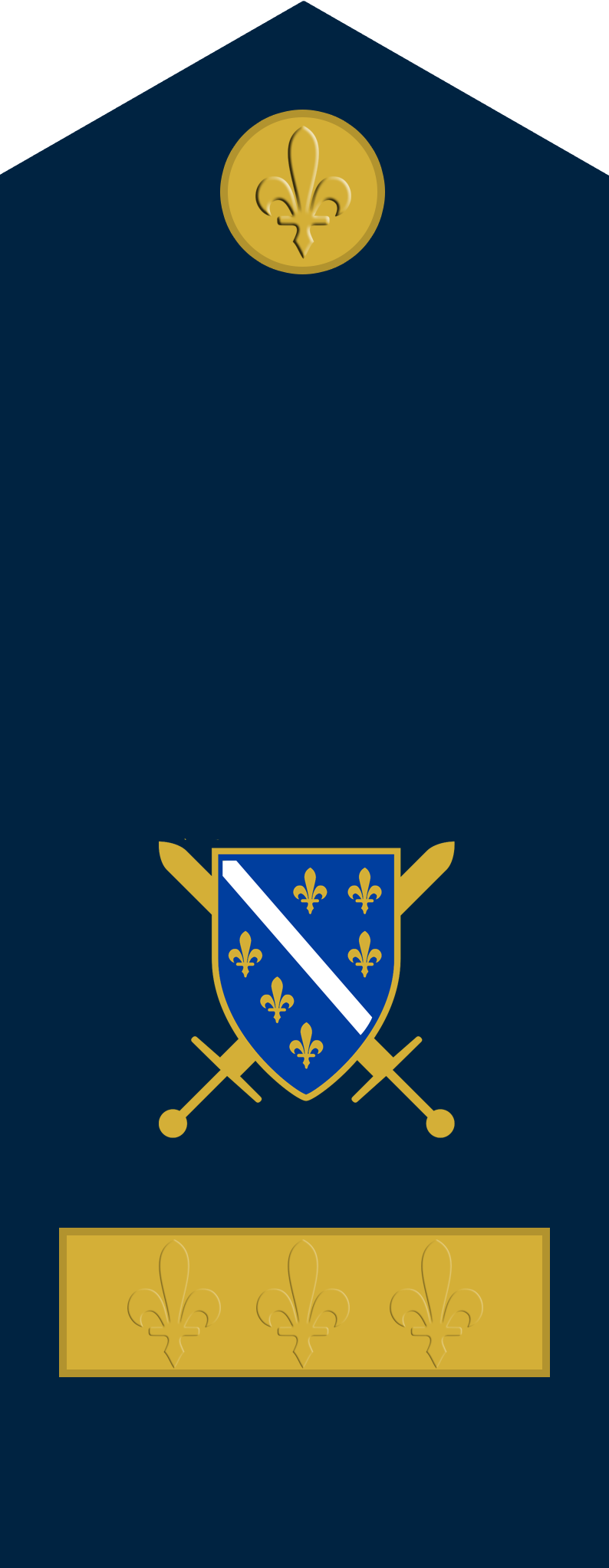
Rank group	Honorary
1992–1993
1993–1997
	Članovi Predsjedništva	Članovi Ministarstva odbrane
	Members of the Presidency	Members of the Ministry of Defense

=== Commissioned officer ranks ===
The rank insignia of commissioned officers.

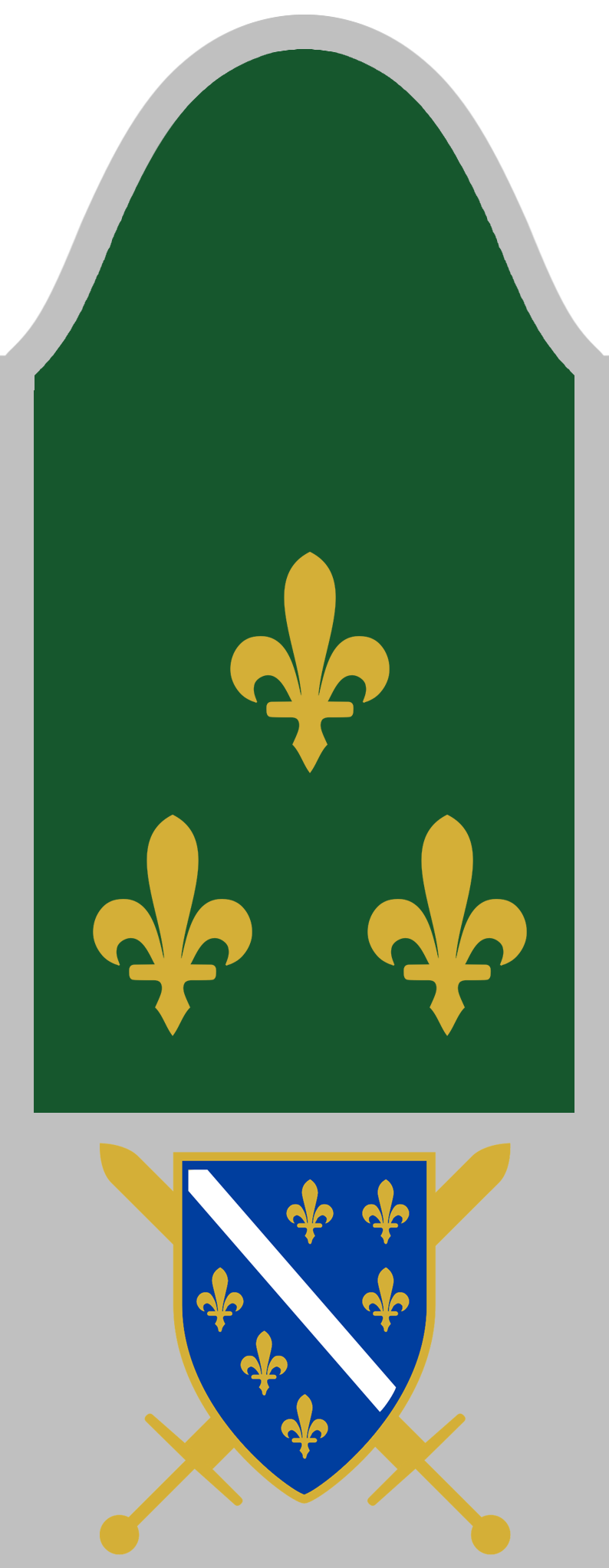
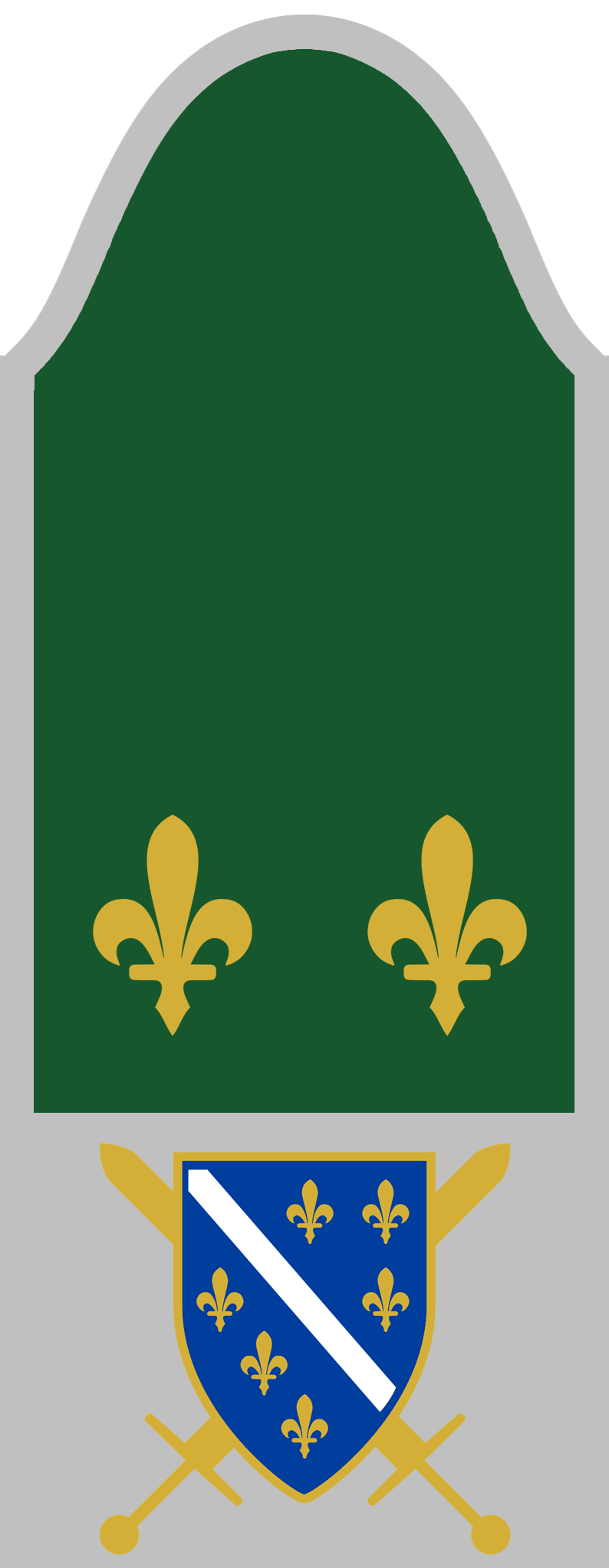
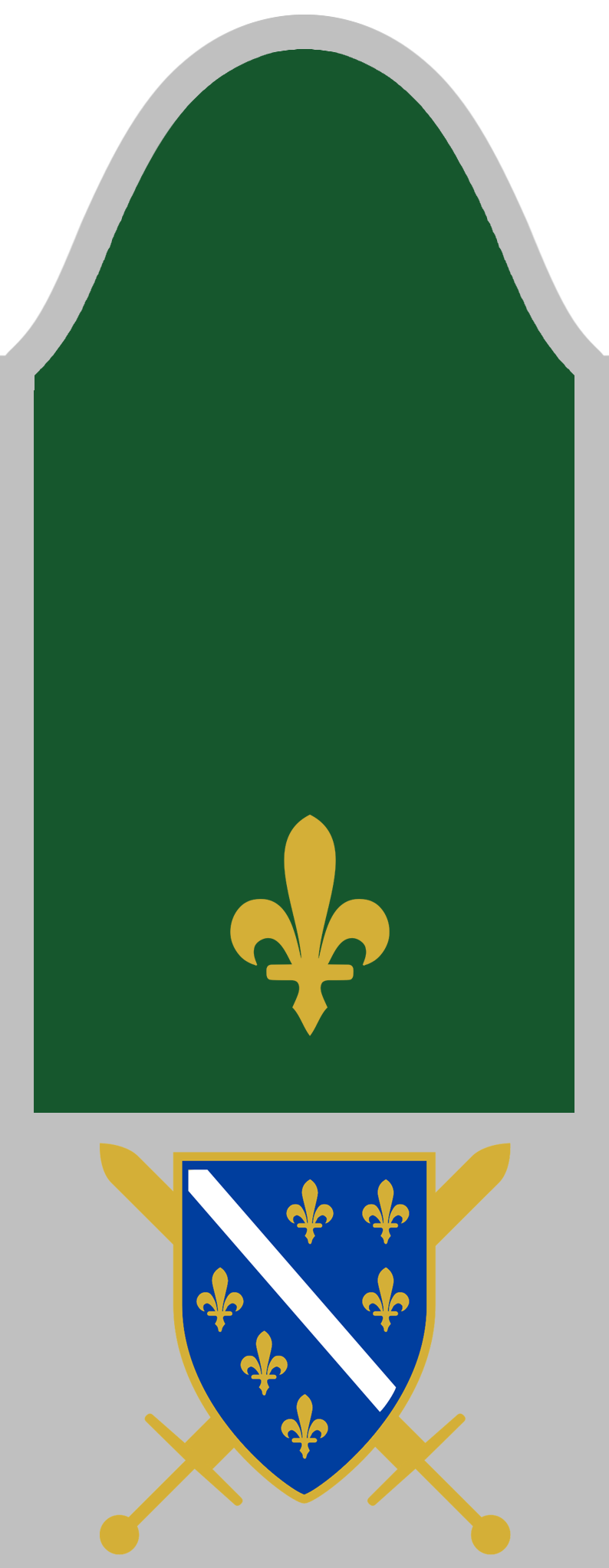
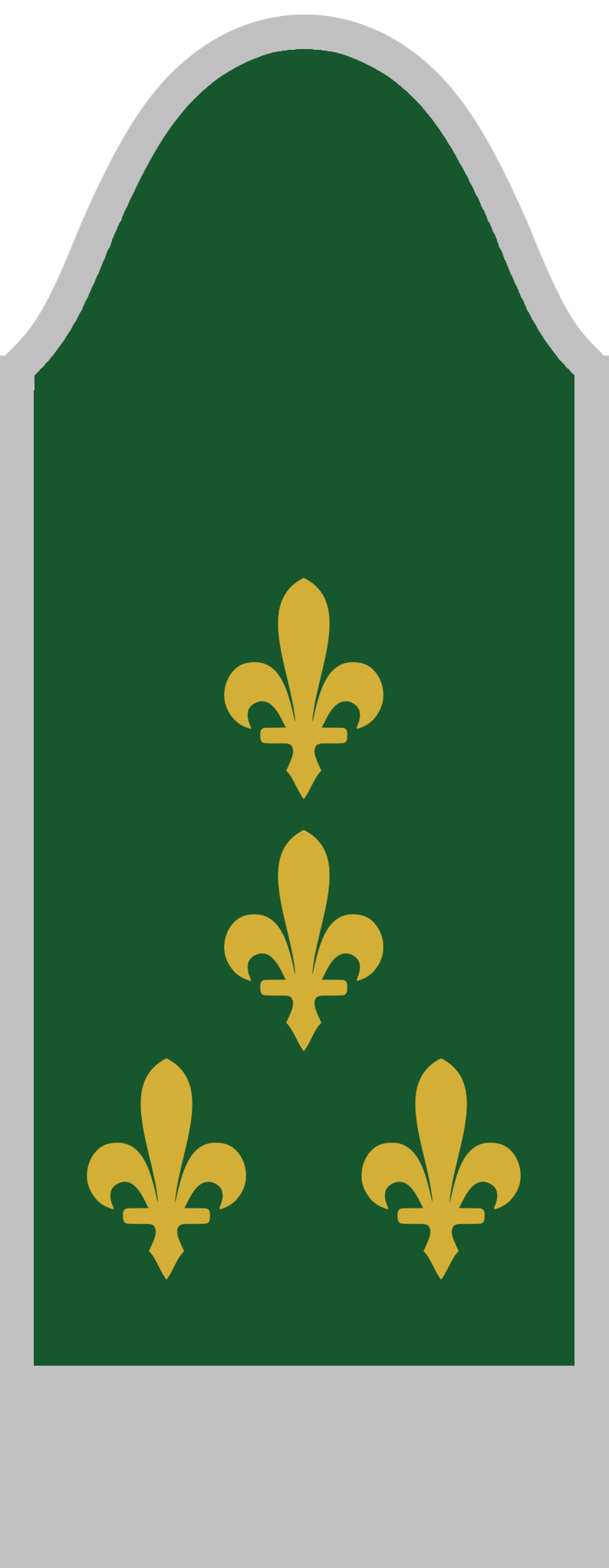
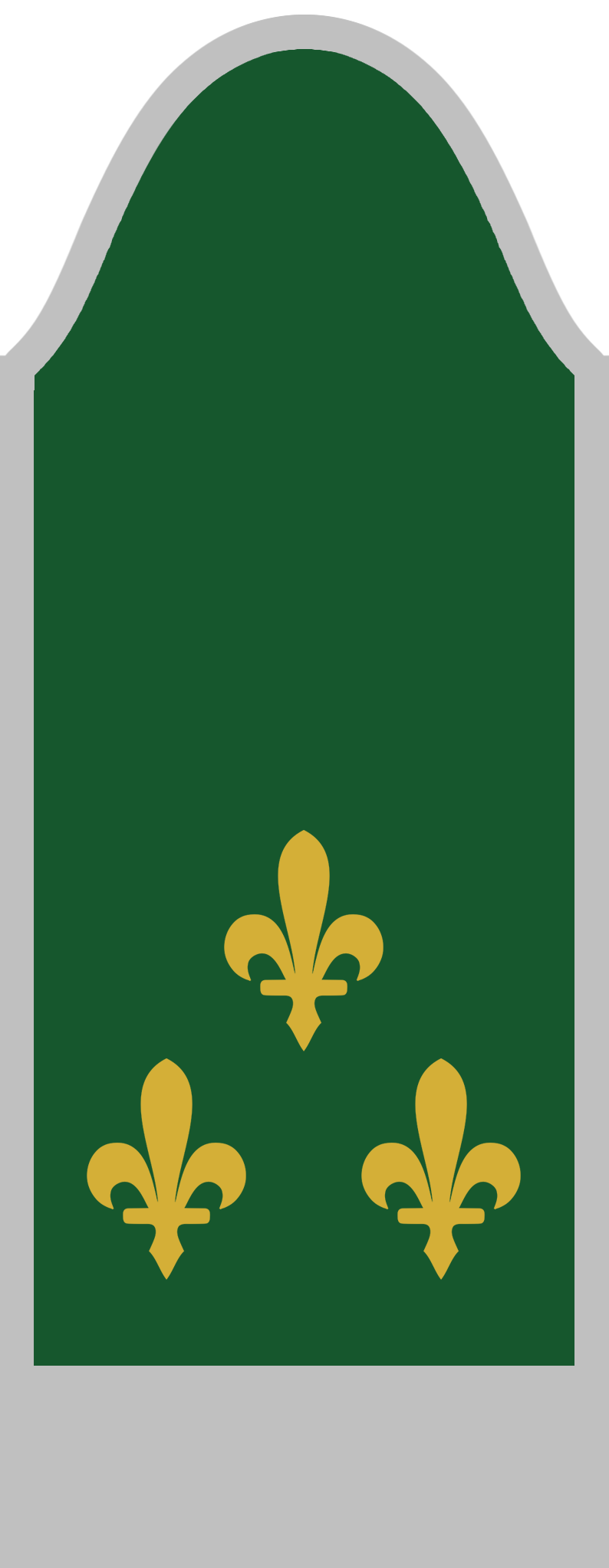
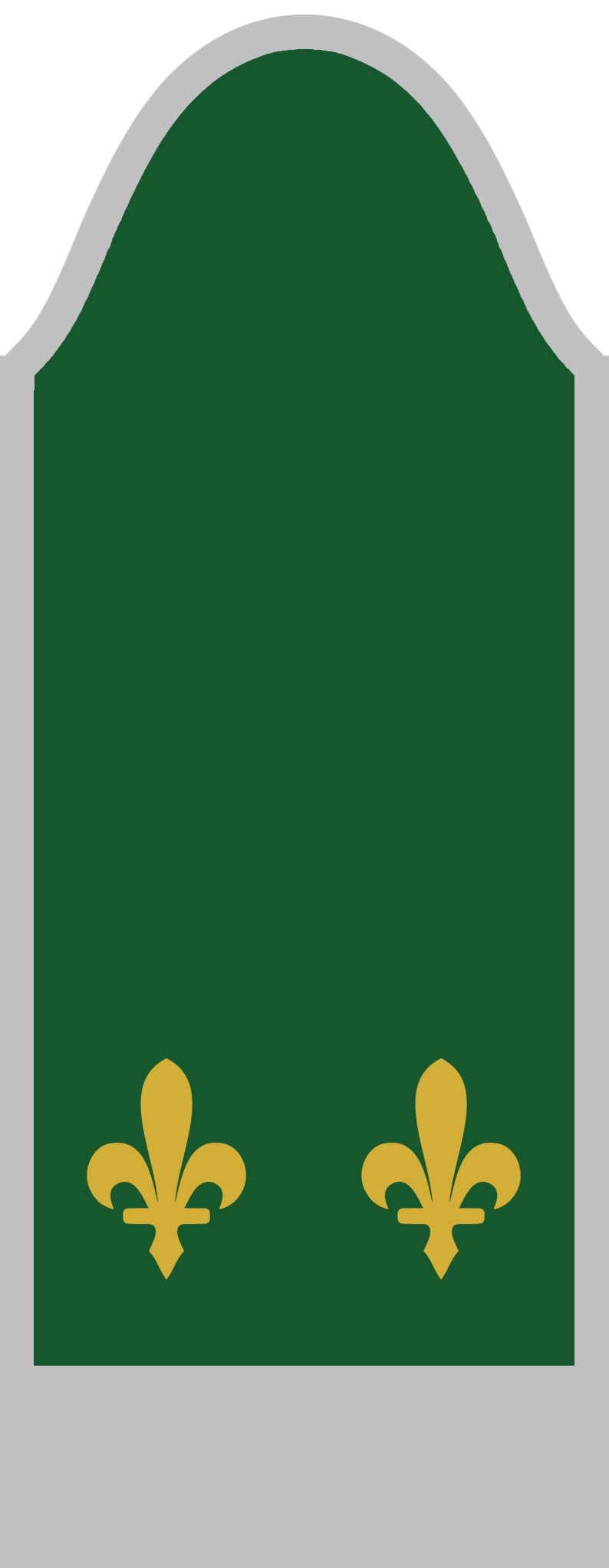
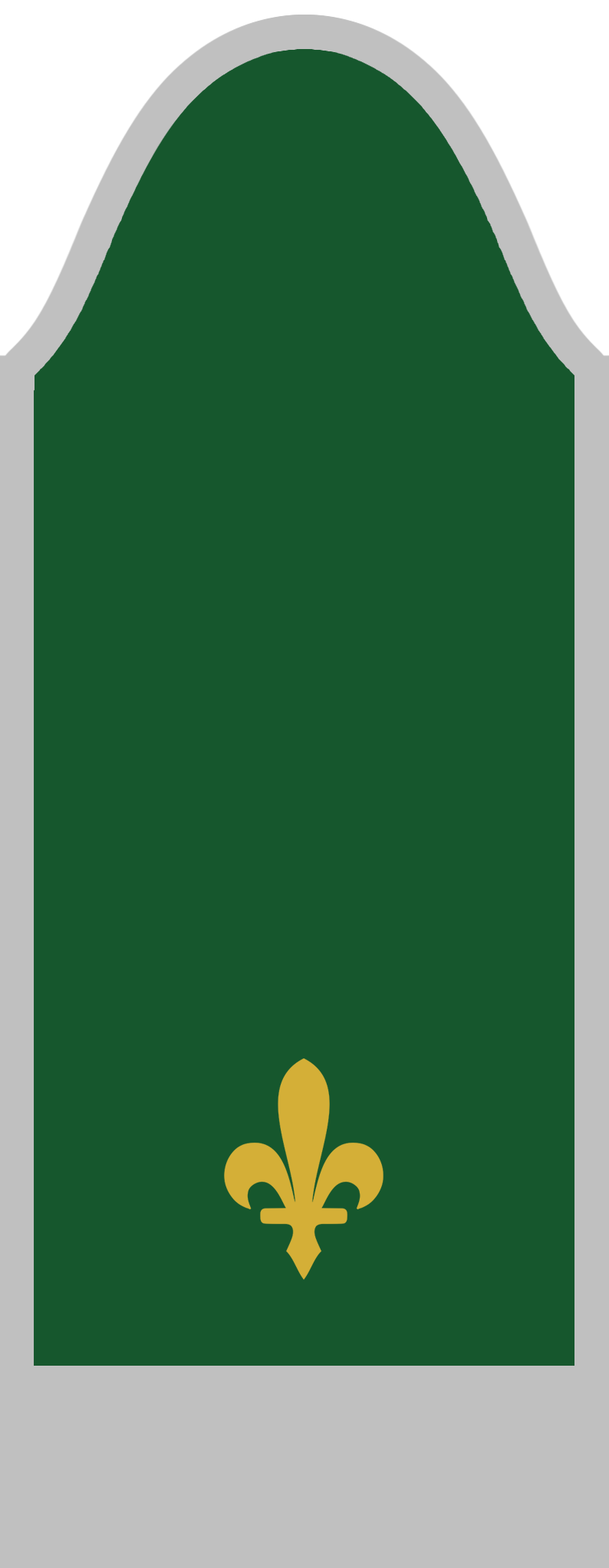
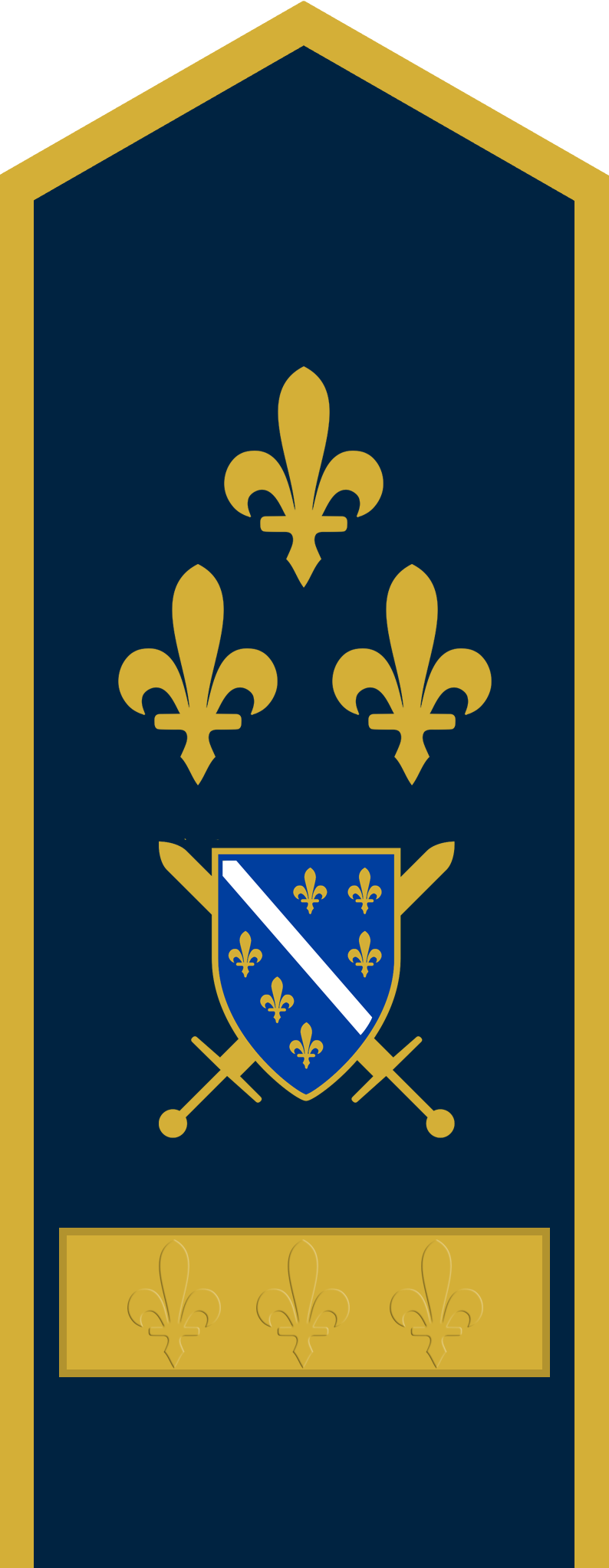
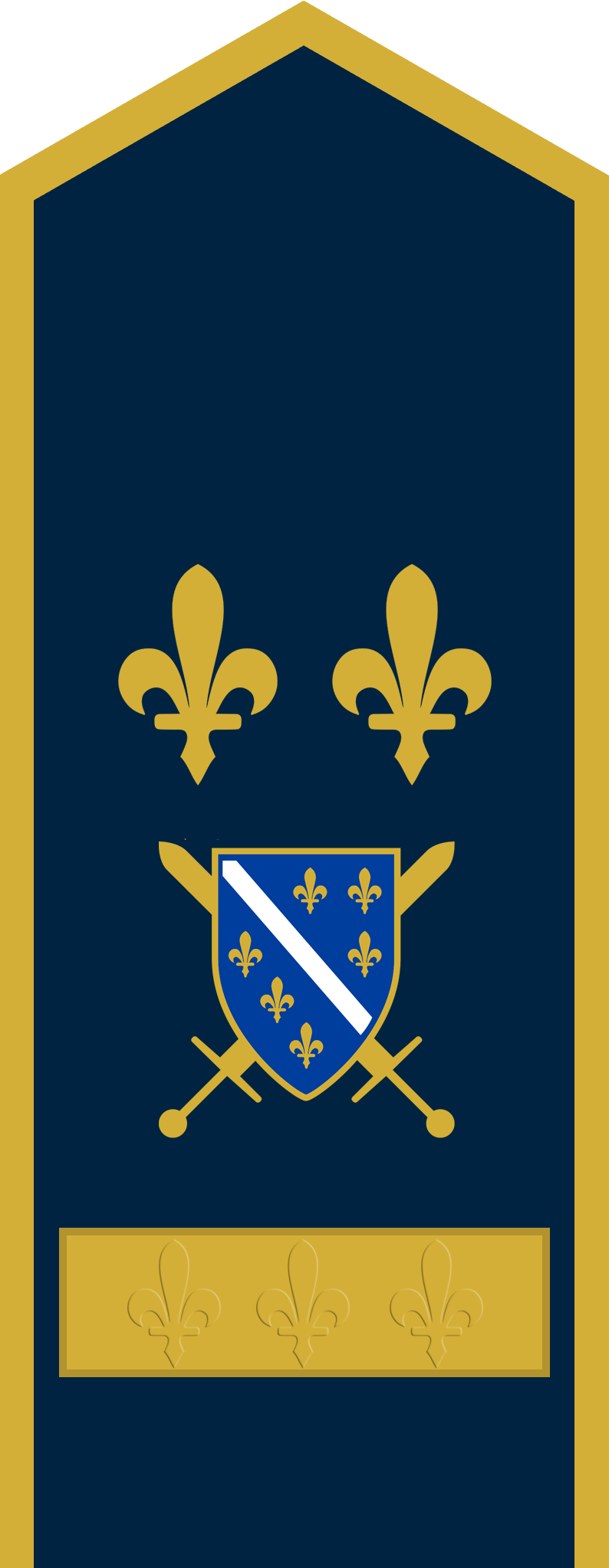
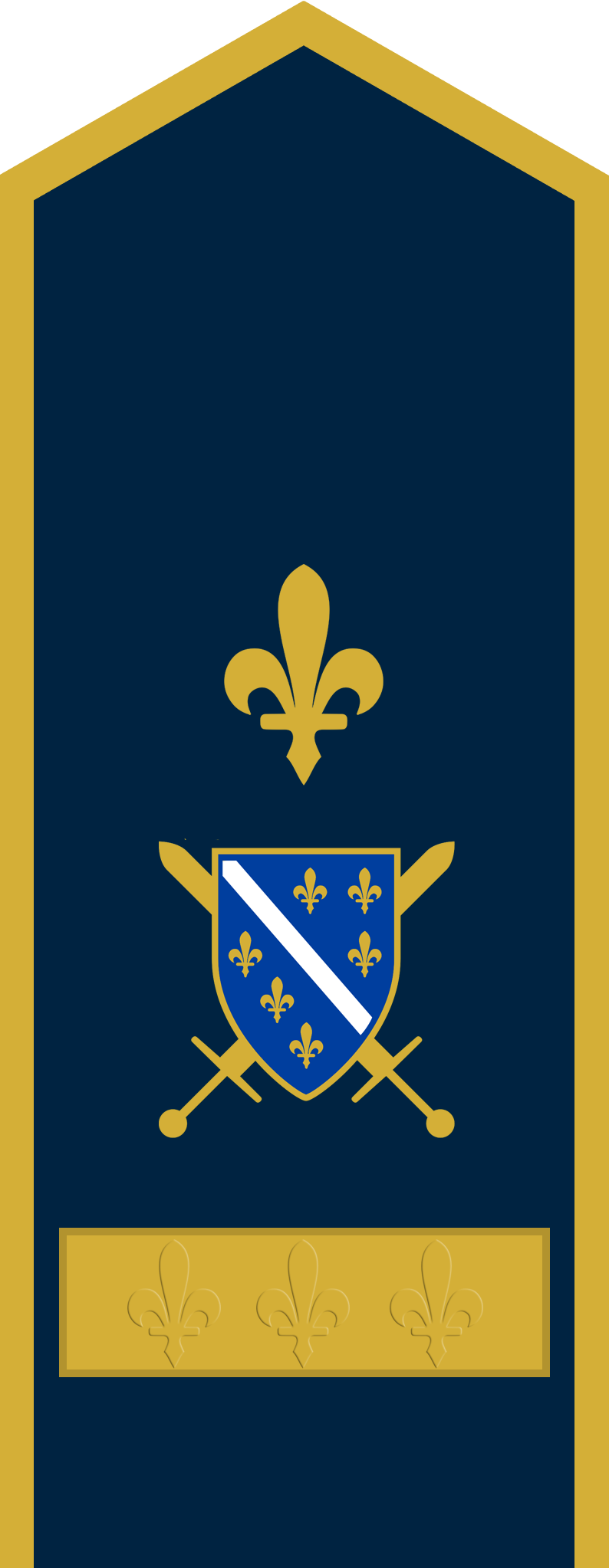
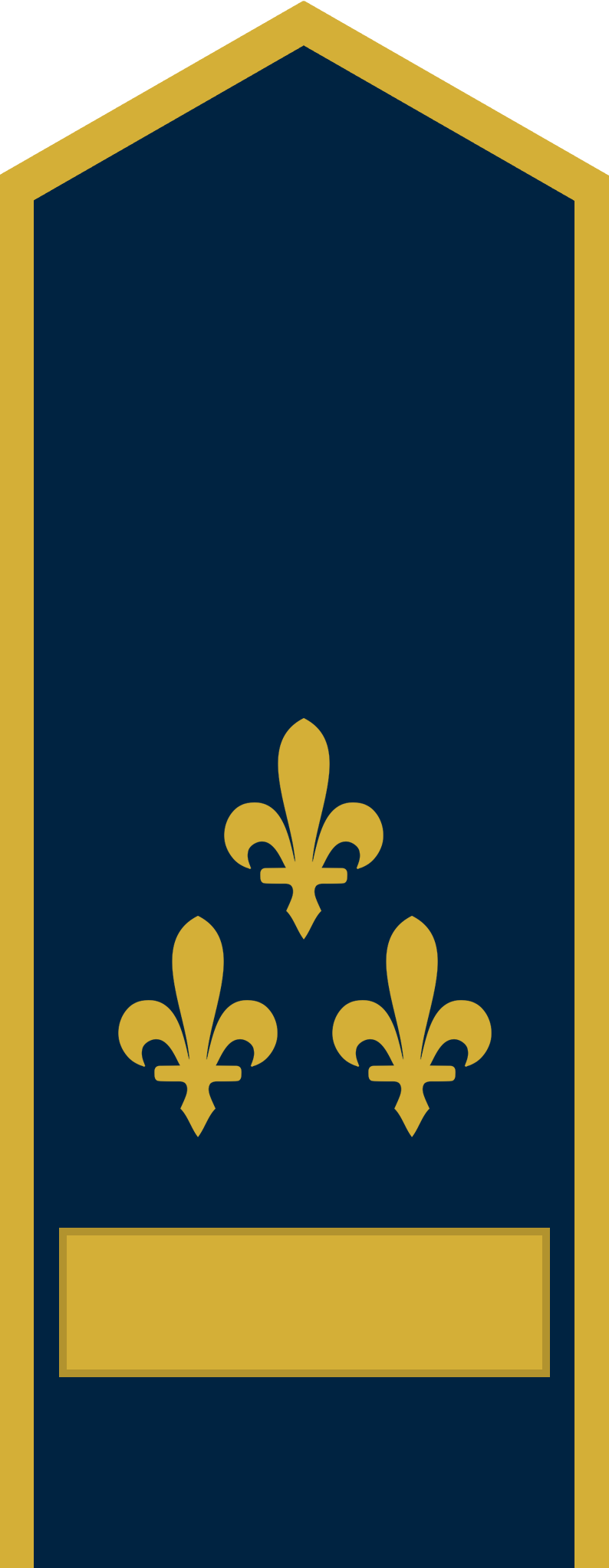
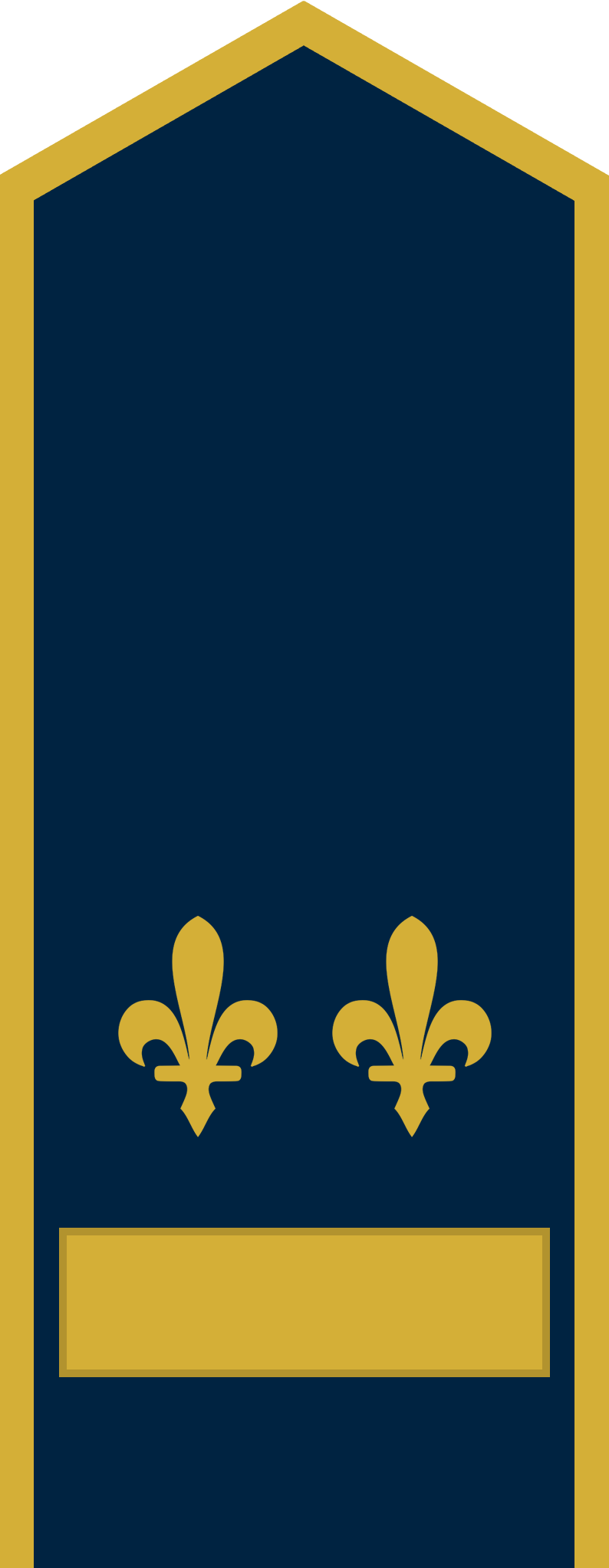
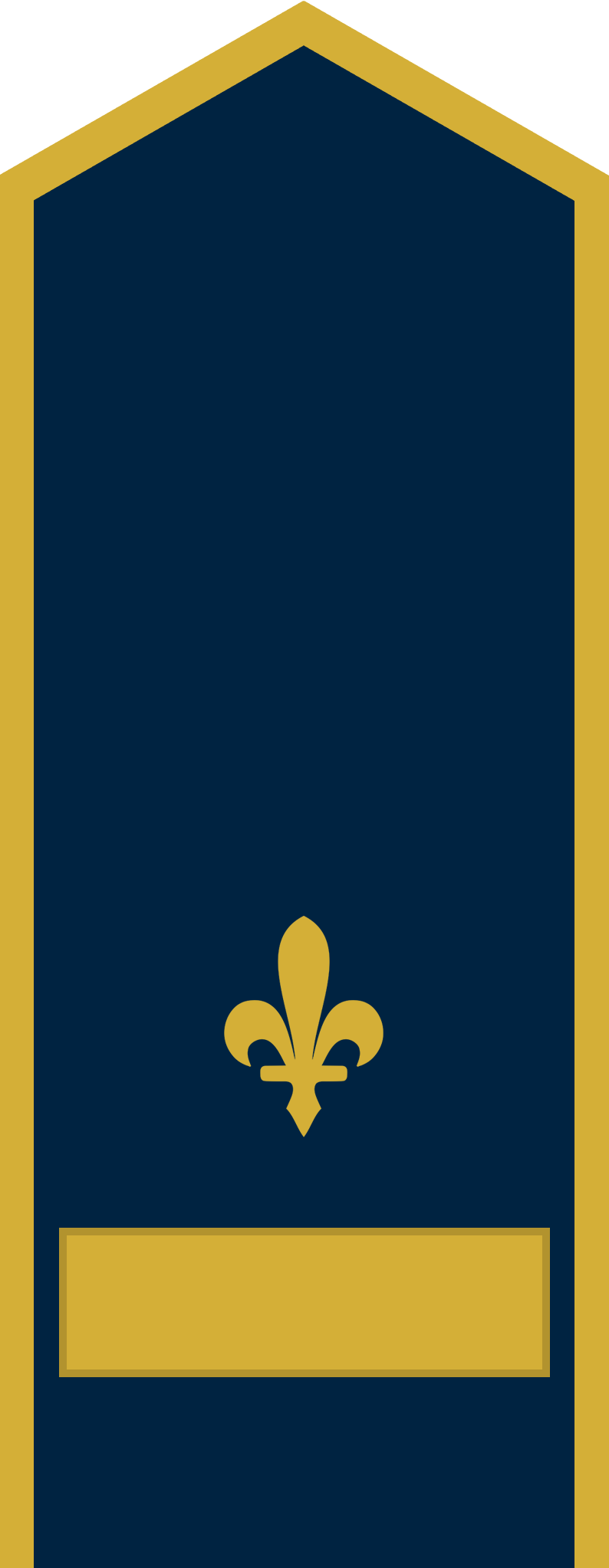
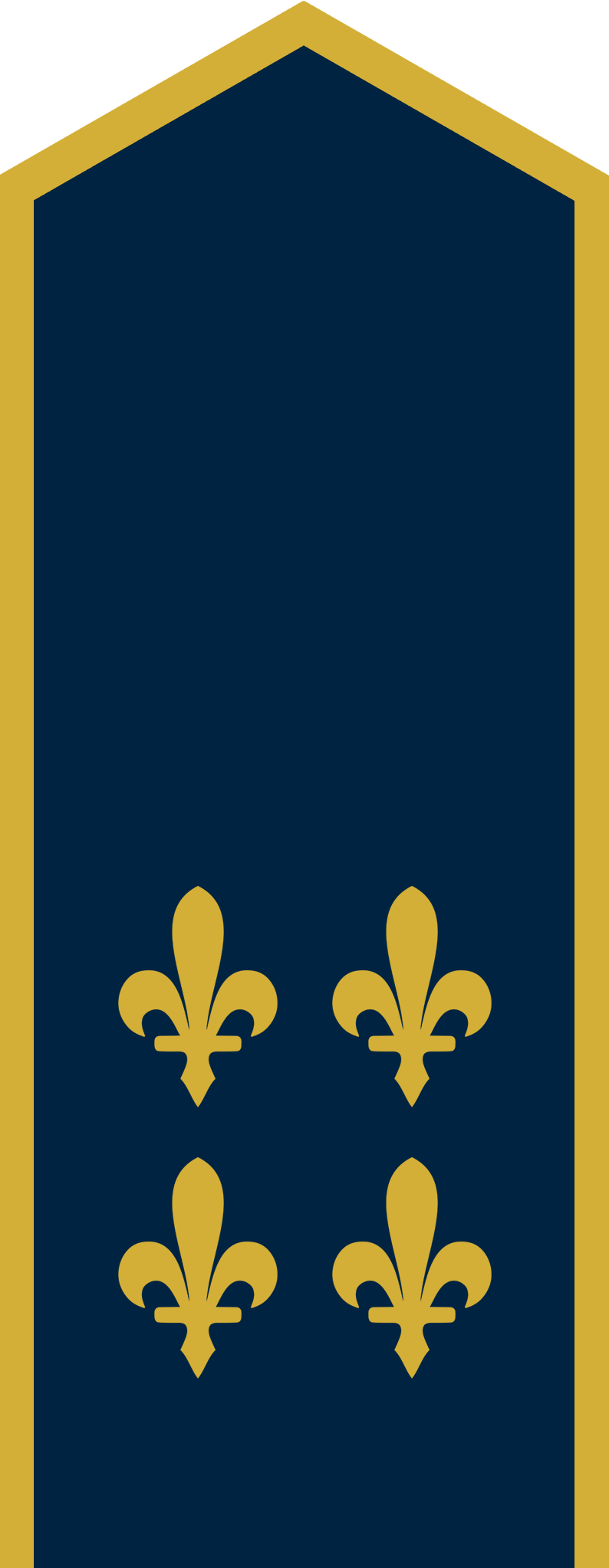
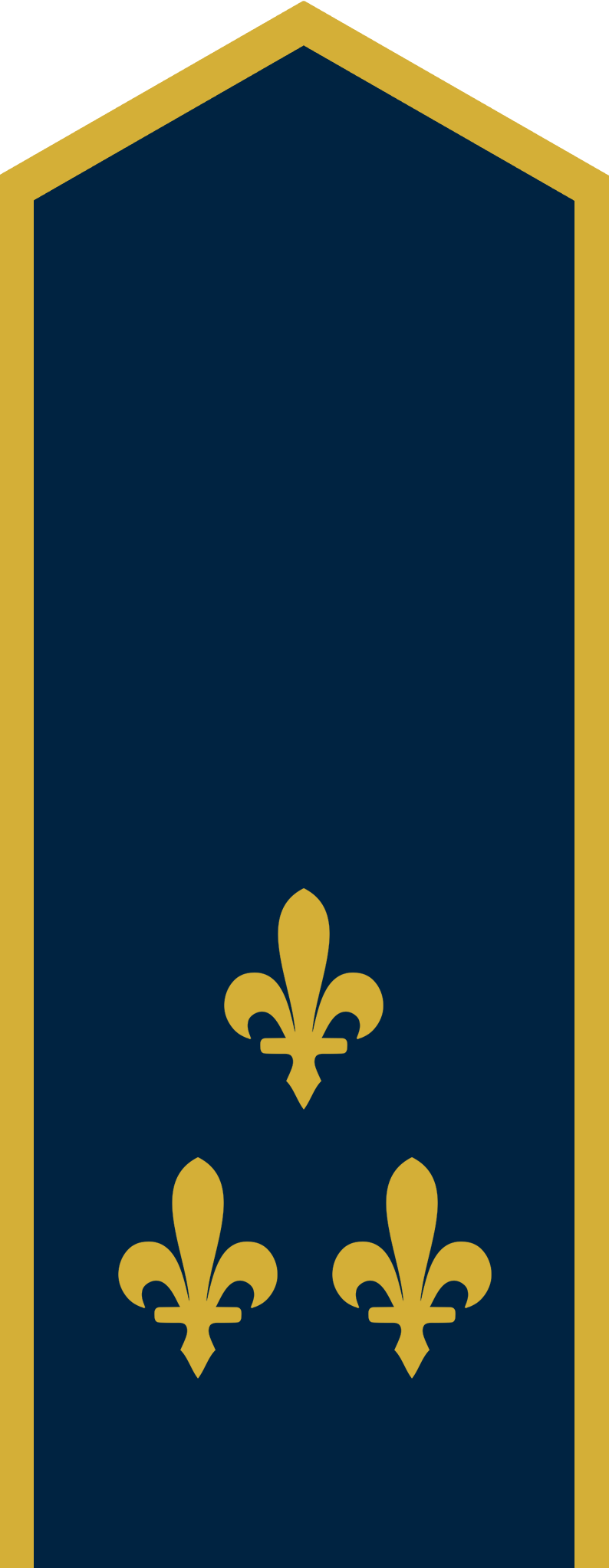
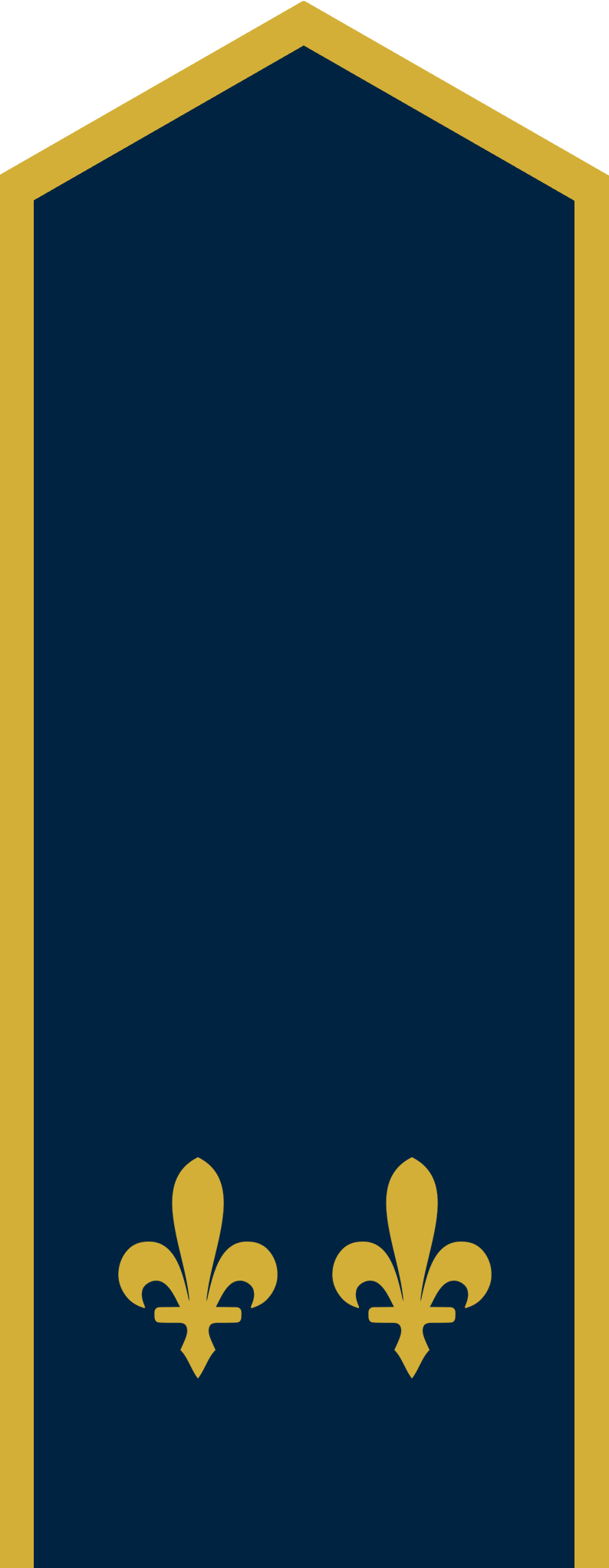
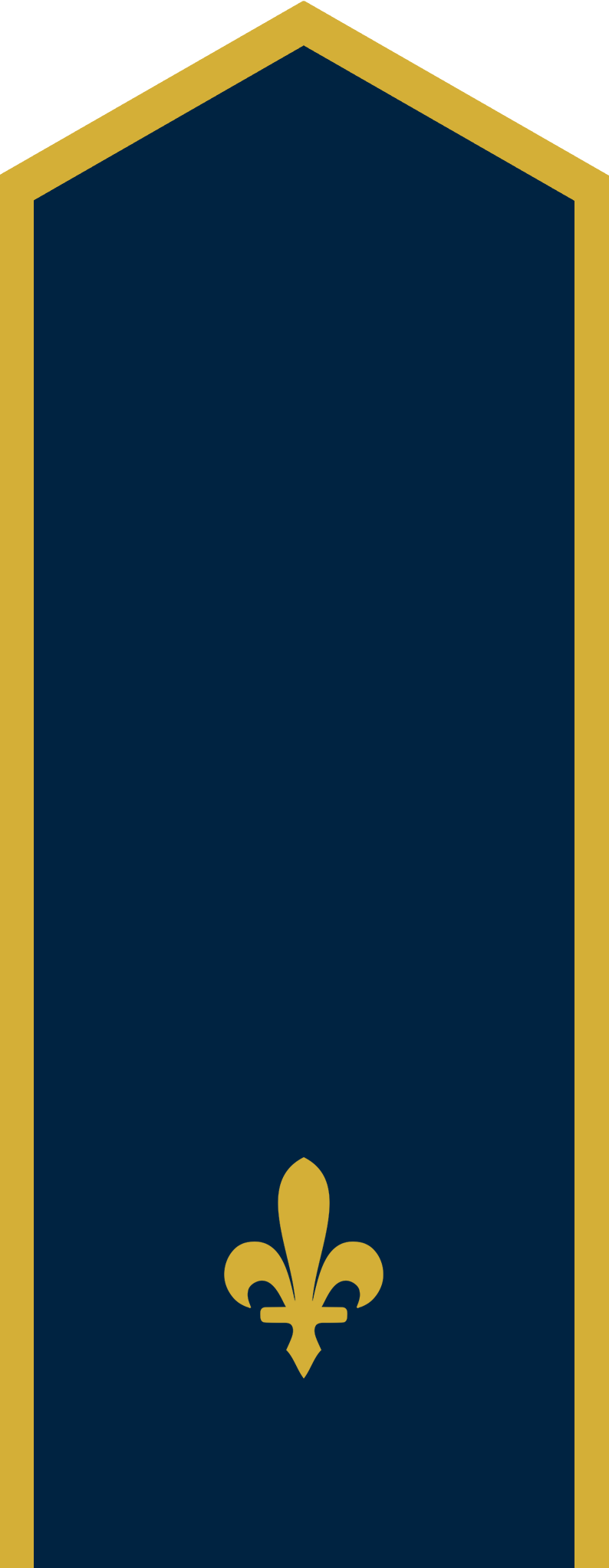
Rank group	General / flag officers			Senior officers			Junior officers
Rank	Armijski general	Divizijski general	Brigadni general	Brigadir	Pukovnik	Major	Nadkapetan	Kapetan	Nadporučnik	Poručnik
1992–1993
1993–1997

=== Other ranks ===
The rank insignia of non-commissioned officers and enlisted personnel.

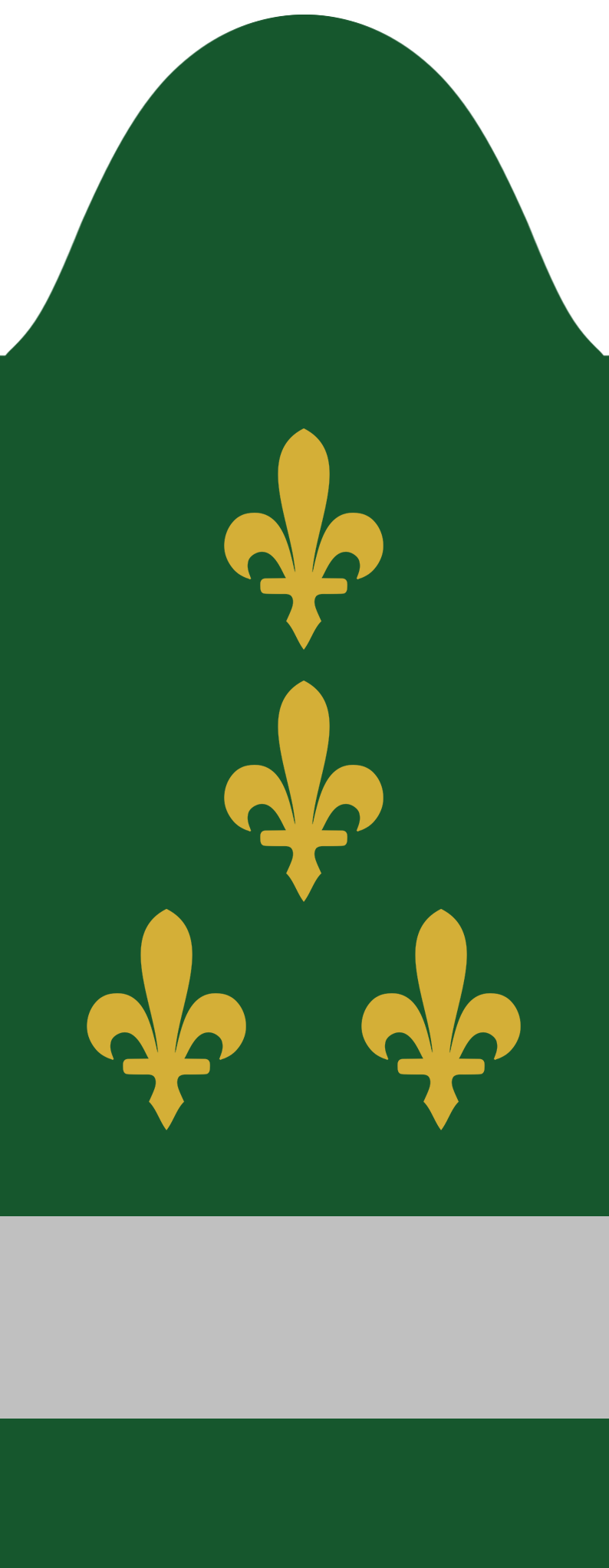
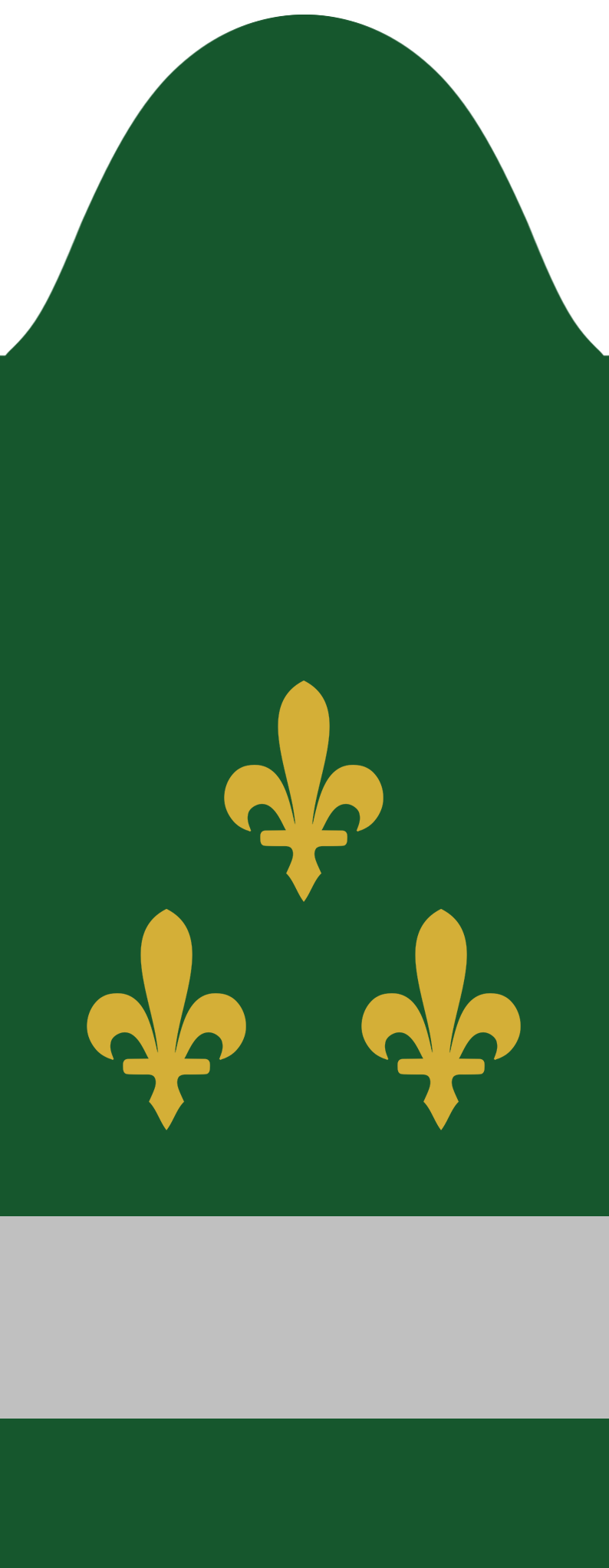
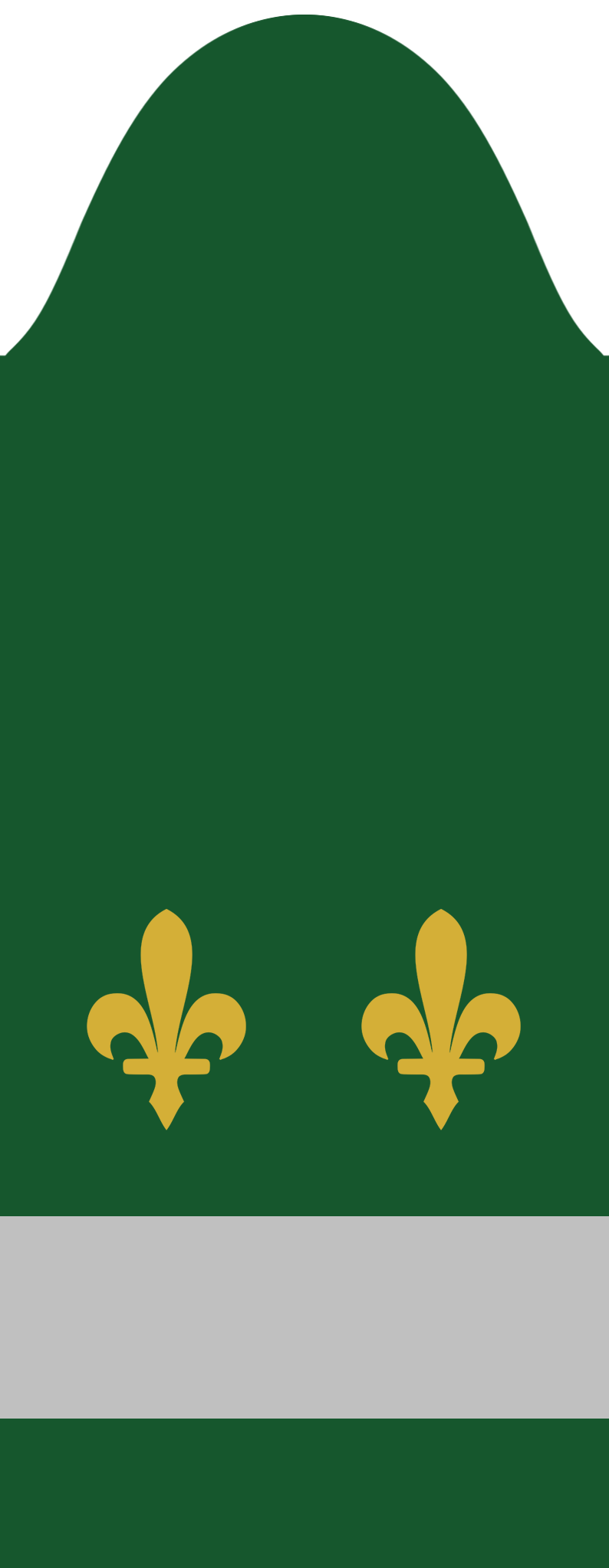
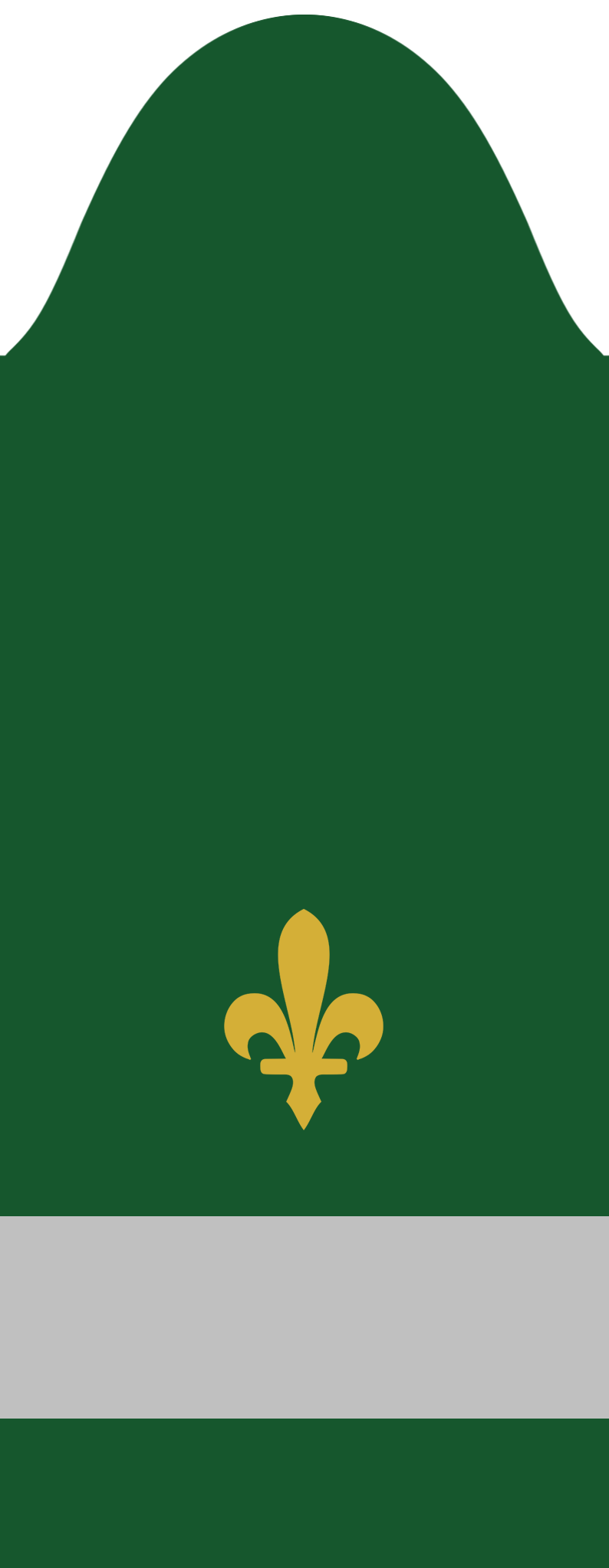
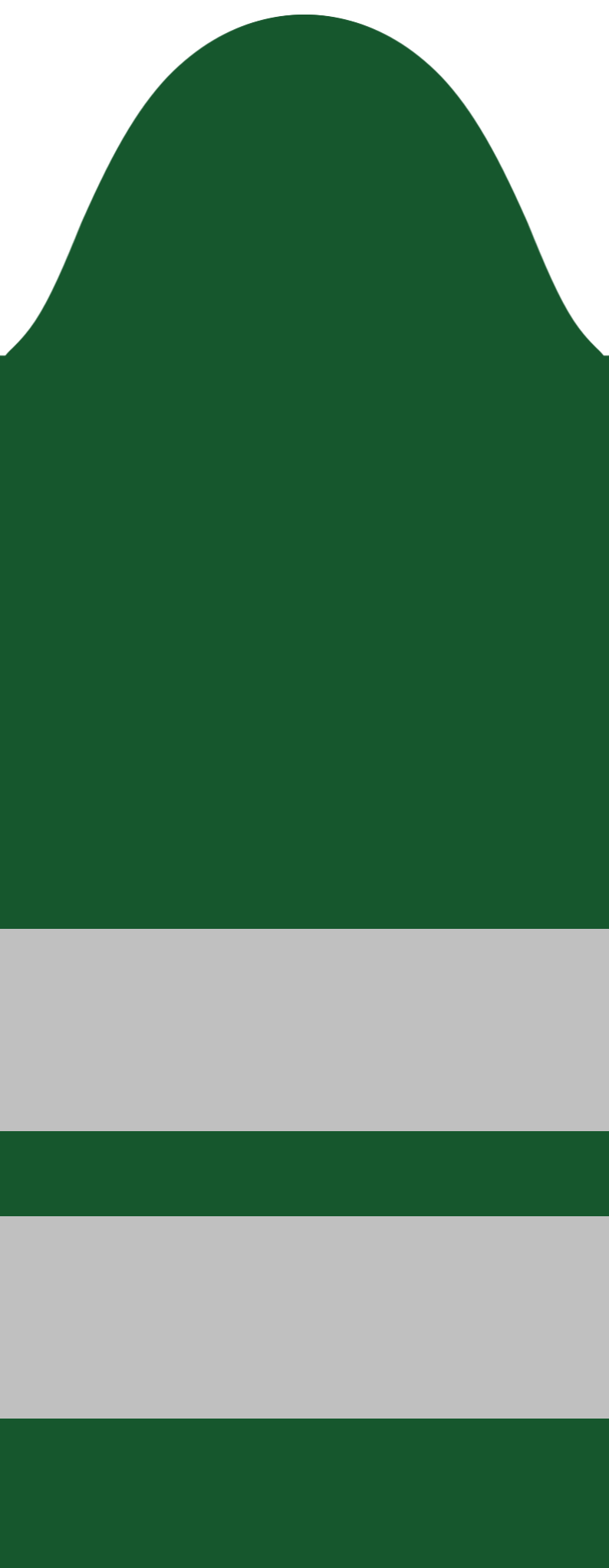
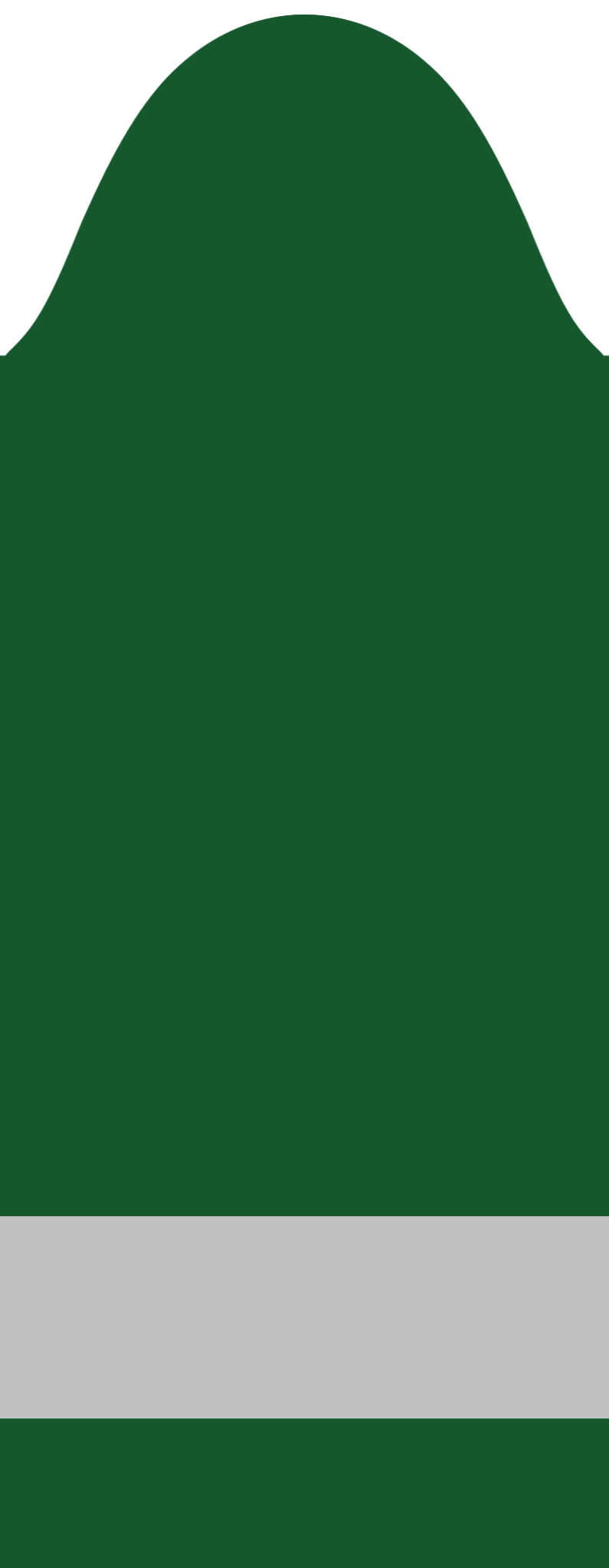
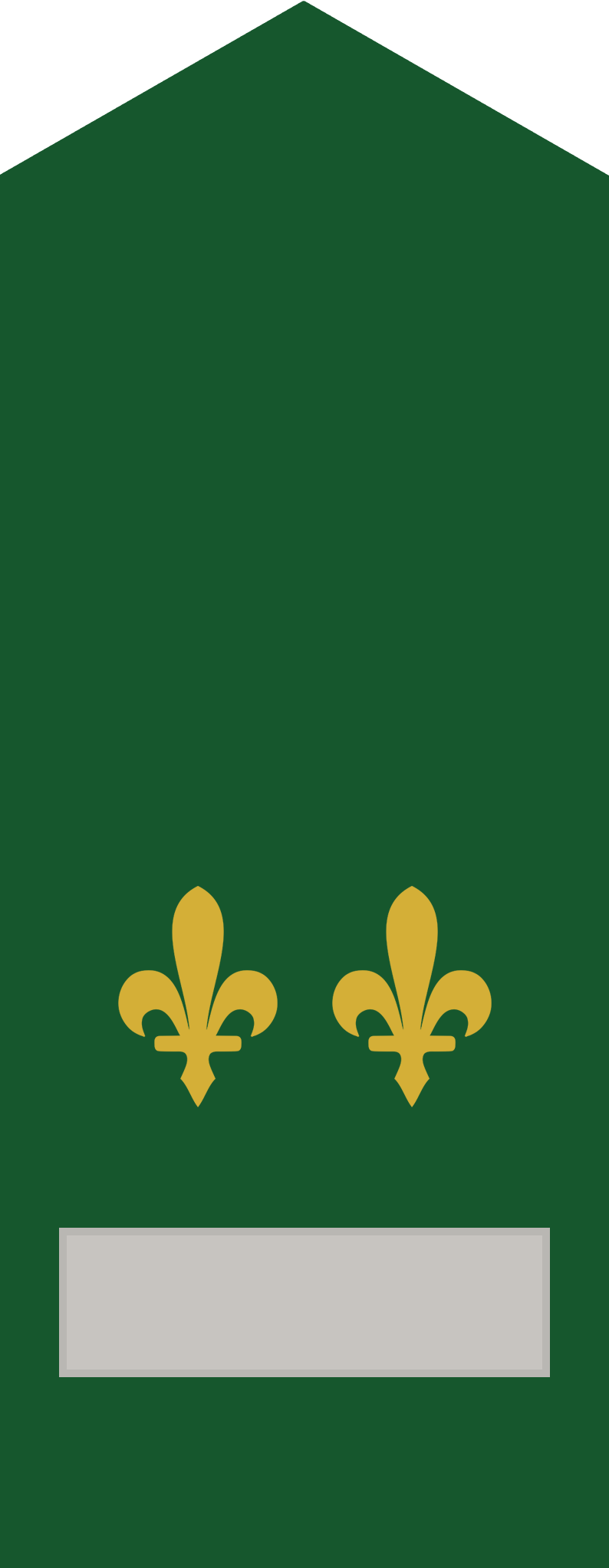
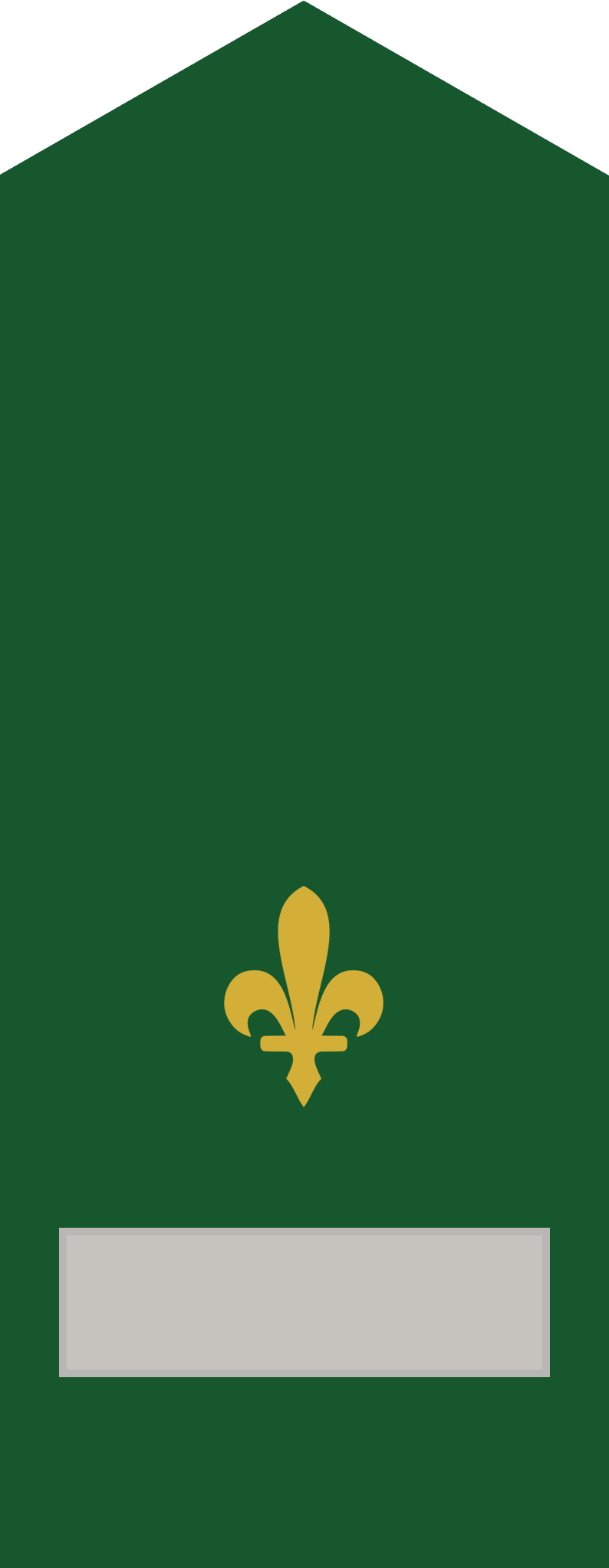
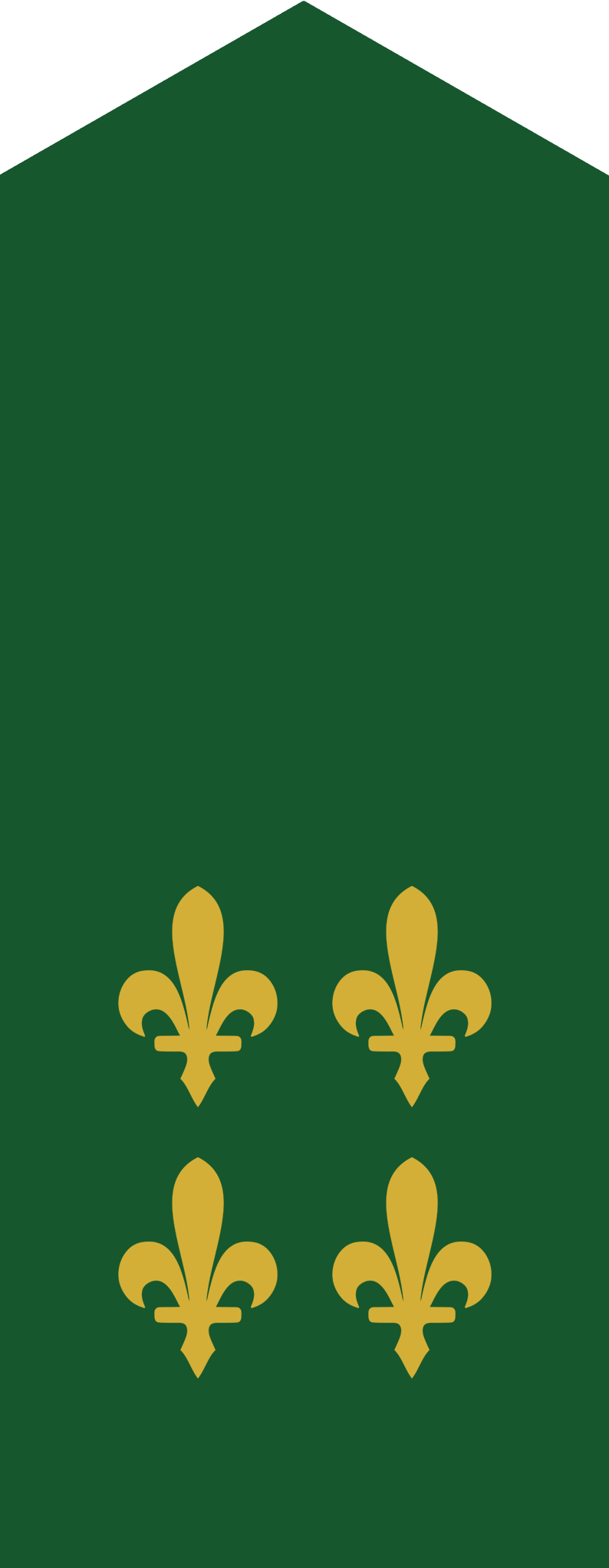
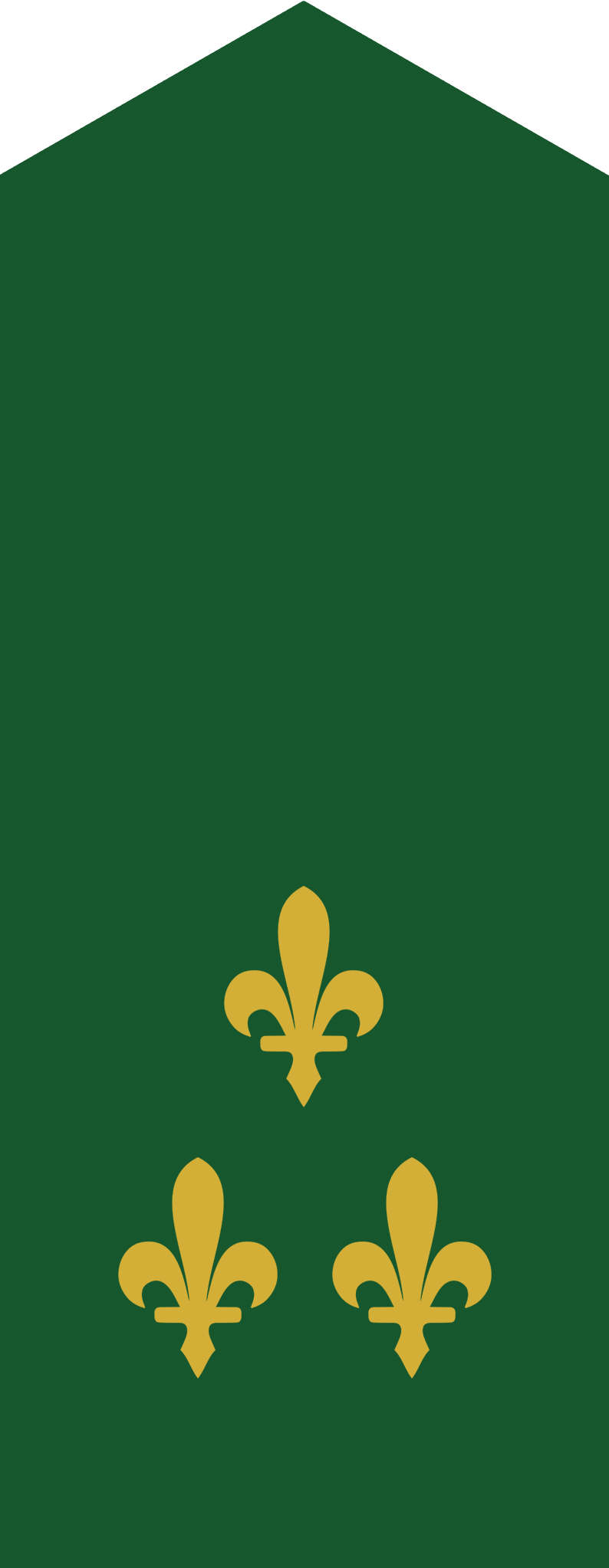
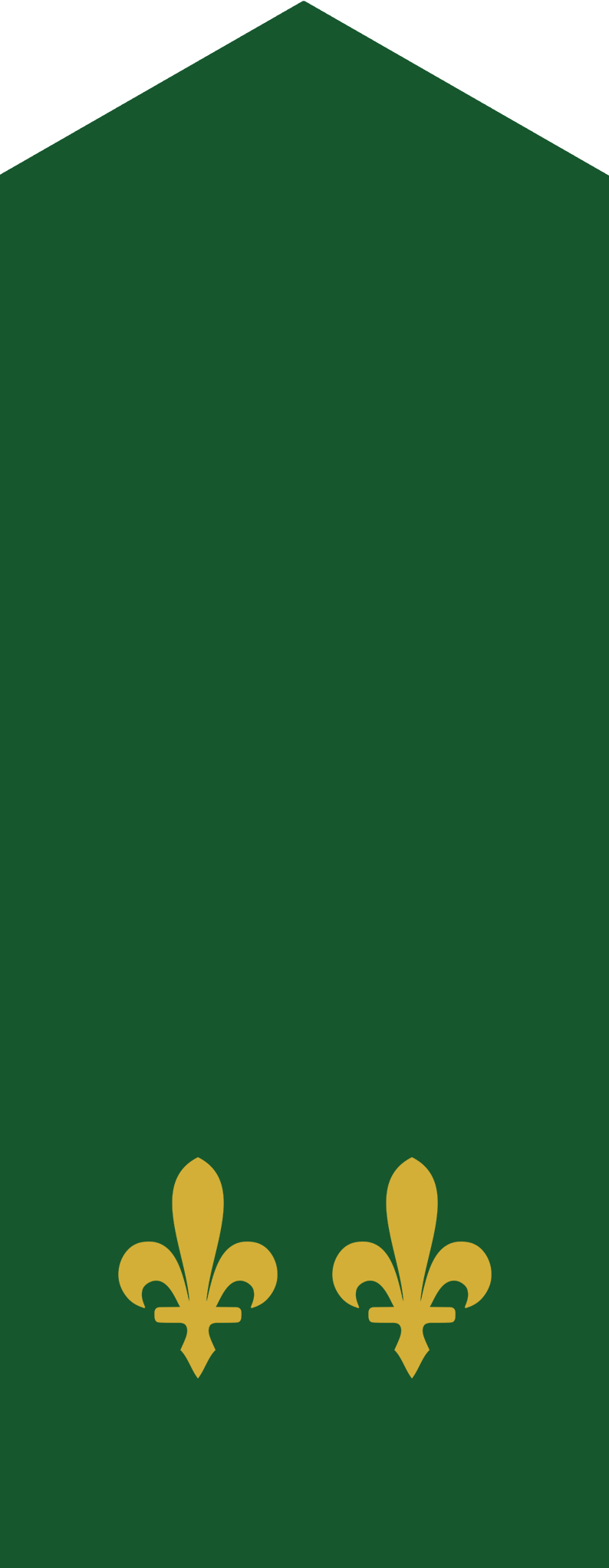
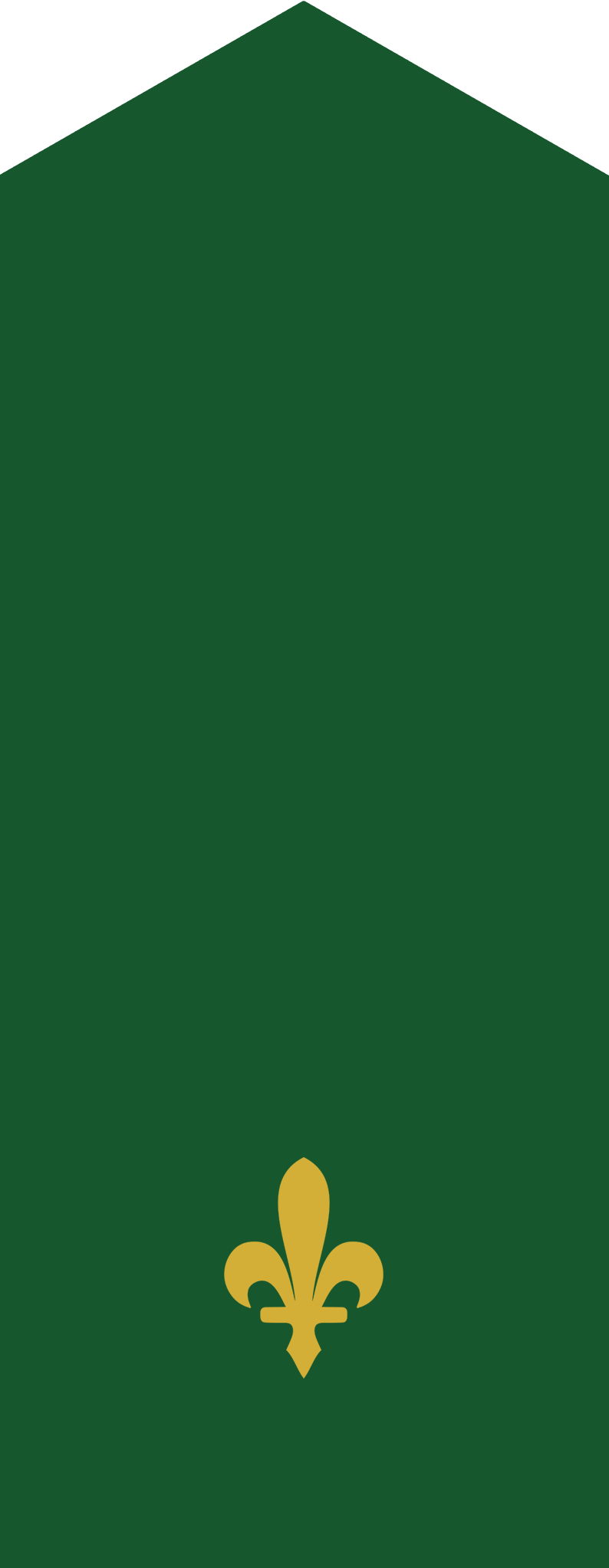
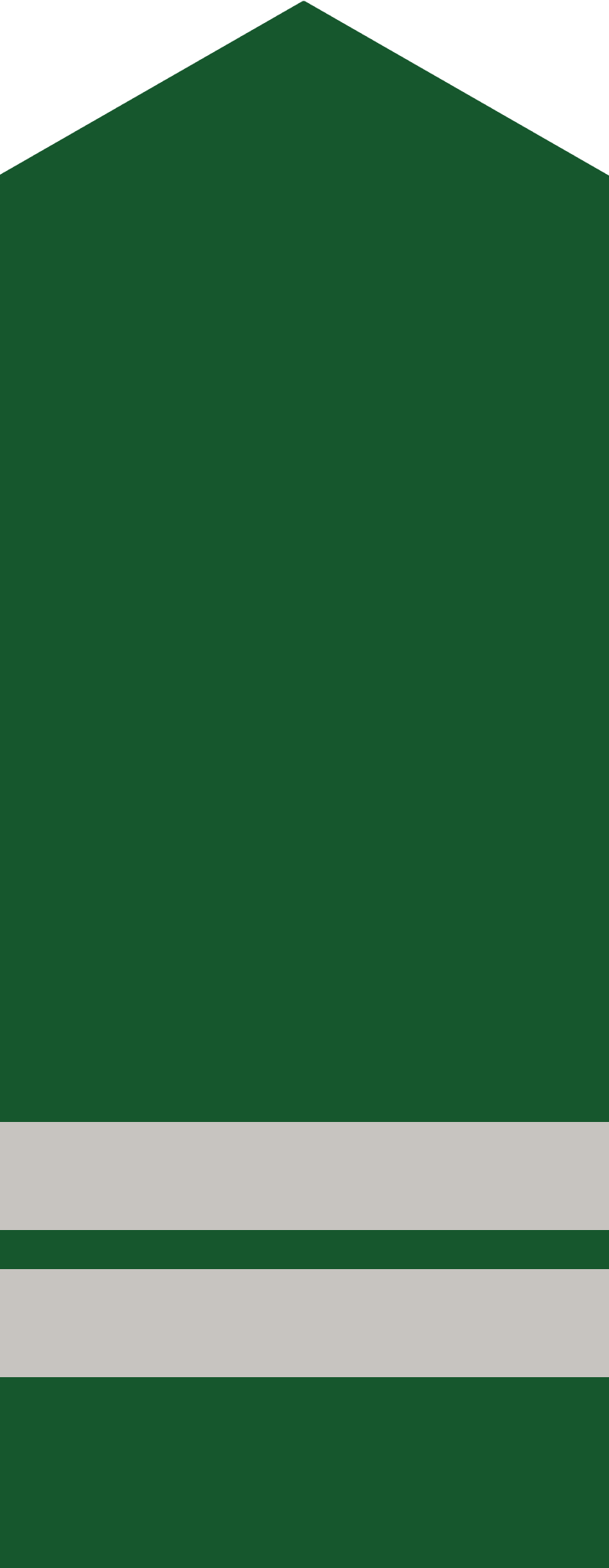
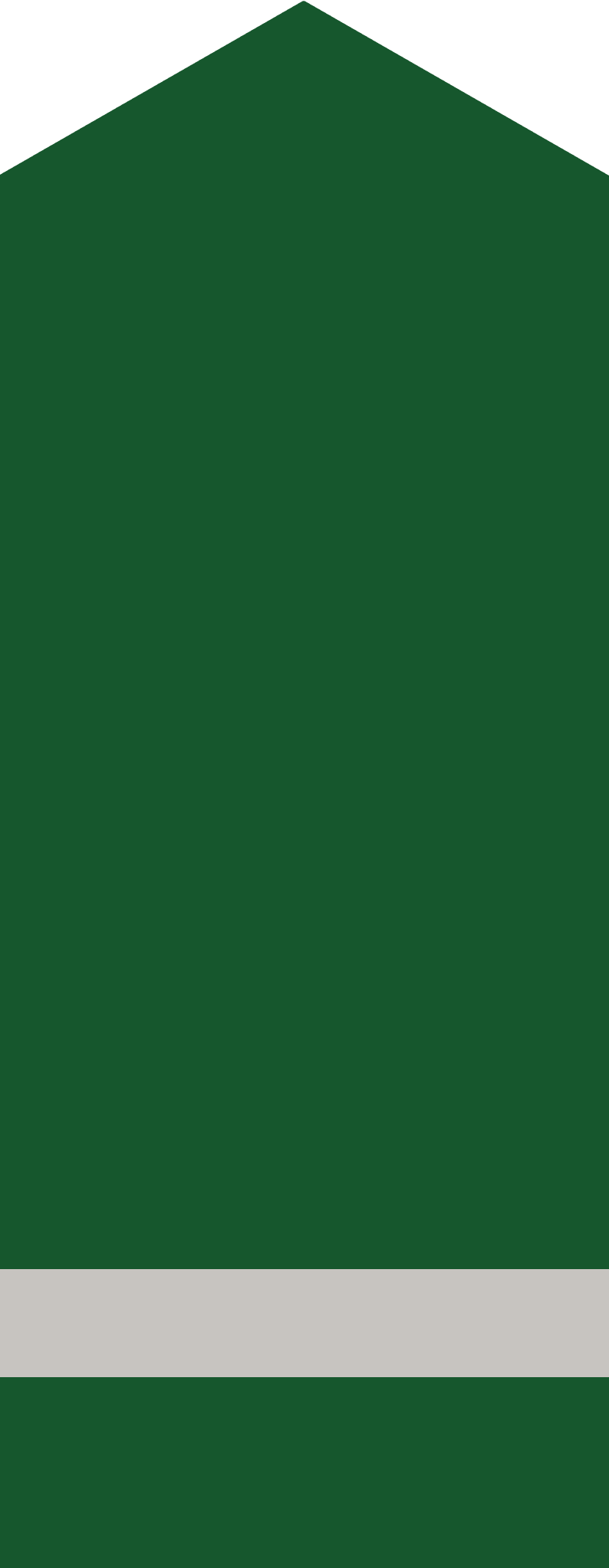
Rank group	Non-commissioned officers						Soldiers
Rank	Nadzastavnik	Zastavnik	Nadčelnik	Čelnik	Nadvodnik	Vodnik	Desetar	Razvodnik
1992–1993
1993–1997

== See also ==
- Military ranks of Republika Srpska
- Military ranks of Socialist Yugoslavia
