= Military ranks of Republika Srpska =

Emblem of Serbian army and left arm patch of the Army of Republika Srpska from 1997-2006

Military ranks and insignia of Republika Srpska show military rank hierarchy and insignia system in Republika Srpska during existence of Army of Republika Srpska (Војска Републике Српскe, Vojska Republike Srpske) from May 12, 1992 to January 1, 2006, when it was merged into Armed Forces of Bosnia and Herzegovina. In period of existence of Army of Republika Srpska there was three periods of changing ranks:

- Period of same as Yugoslav People's Army ranks (1992–1997),
- Period of first change and modernization (1997–2000) and
- Last changes before merging into Armed Forces of Bosnia and Herzegovina (2000–2006).

== 1992–1997 ==
Left arm patch of the Army of Republika Srpska from 1992-1997.

Helmet decal of the Army of Republika Srpska from 1992-1995.

This period is considered as war-time and post-war. Ranks in these period are first military ranks in Republika Srpska. During the war and because of the link between Army of Republika Srpska and Yugoslav People's Army, these two armies shared an identical ranks system. The VRS almost always used field ranks due to the situation and the fact that only combat uniforms were worn by soldiers and officers. According to Article 4 of "Decision of founding Army of Serb Republic of Bosnia and Herzegovina" on May 12, 1992, VRS ranks were the same as in the JNA:

- for soldiers: vojnik (private), razvodnik (lance corporal), desetar (corporal) and mlađi vodnik (junior sergeant),
- for non-commissioned officers: vodnik (sergeant), vodnik prve klase (sergeant first class), stariji vodnik (senior sergeant), stariji vodnik prve klase (first sergeant), zastavnik (warrant officer), zastavnik prve klase (chief warrant officer),
- for officers: potporučnik (second lieutenant), poručnik (lieutenant), kapetan (captain), kapetan prve klase (senior captain), major (major), potpukovnik (lieutenant colonel), pukovnik (colonel),
- for generals: general-major (major general), general-potpukovnik (lieutenant colonel general), general-pukovnik (colonel general) and general vojske (army general).

Ranks were worn on combat uniform above the left breast pocket on part of canvas with velcro behind. Branch insignia were placed above the rank. Usually high officers had it on their ranks.

Uniform insignia consisted of a round-shaped flag with the Cyrillic inscription Army of Republika Srpska (Војска Републике Српске, translit. Vojska Republike Srpske) worn on left arm.

=== Generals and officers (1992–1997) ===
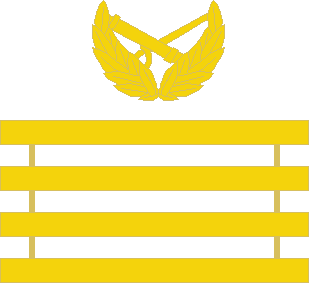
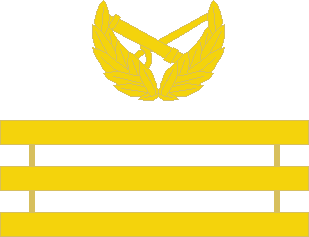
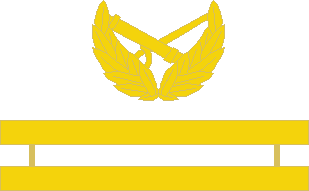
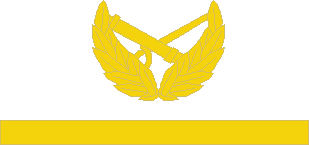
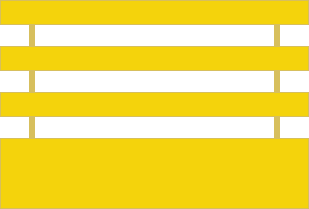
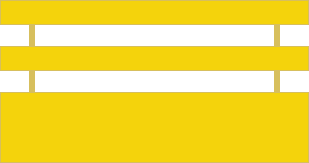
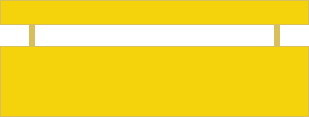
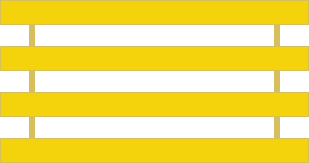
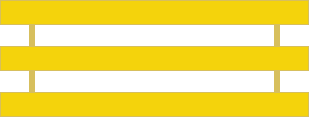
Rank group	General / flag officers				Senior officers			Junior officers
Republika Srpska
Republika Srpska	General vojske Генерал војске	General-pukovnik; Генерал-пуковник	General-potpukovnik; Генерал-потпуковник	General-major; Генерал-мајор	Pukovnik; Пуковник	Potpukovnik; Потпуковник	Major; Мајор	Kapetan prve klase Капетан прве класе	Kapetan; Капетан	Poručnik; Поручник	Potporučnik; Потпоручник
Usual Translation	Army general	Colonel general	Lieutenant colonel general	Major general	Colonel	Lieutenant colonel	Major	Senior captain	Captain	Lieutenant	Second lieutenant

=== Non-commissioned officers (1992–1997) ===
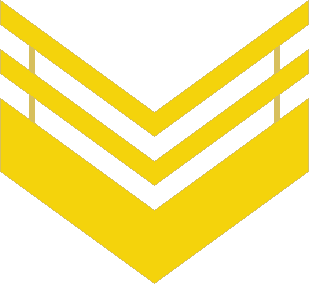
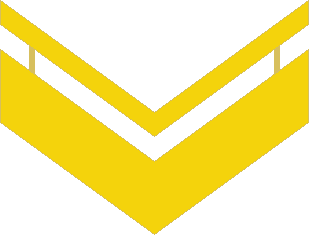
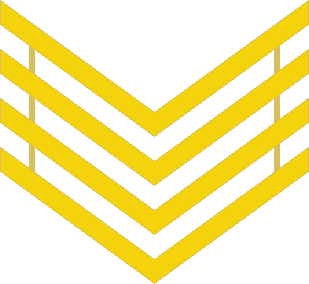
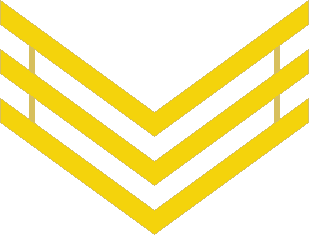
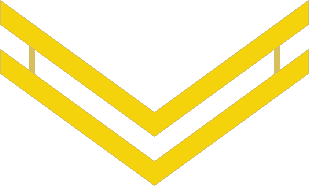
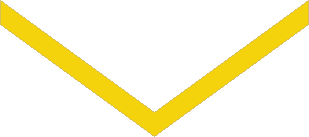
Rank group	Senior NCOs						Junior NCOs		Enlisted
Republika Srpska										No insignia
Republika Srpska	Zastavnik prve klase Заставник прве класе	Zastavnik; Заставник	Stariji vodnik prve klase Старији водник прве класе	Stariji vodnik Старији водник	Vodnik prve klase Водник прве класе	Vodnik; Водник	Mlađi Vodnik; Млађи Водник	Desetar; Десетар	Razvodnik; Разводник	Vojnik; Војник
Usual Translation	Chief warrant officer	Warrant officer	First sergeant	Senior sergeant	Sergeant first class	Sergeant	Corporal	Lance-Corporal	Private First Class	Private

== 1997–2000 ==
After the war, the Army of Republika Srpska's administration modernized the look of army ranks. Despite a more modern design, they incorporated style elements and names according to Serbian military tradition and history. One change was that general ranks changed names (general to đeneral). The new ranks came into effect in 1997, when new uniforms came into service. Ranks from that period were:

- for soldiers: vojnik (private), vojnik prve klase (1st class private) and mlađi vodnik (junior sergeant),
- for non-commissioned officers: vodnik (sergeant), stariji vodnik (senior sergeant), zastavnik (warrant officer),
- for officers: poručnik (lieutenant), kapetan (captain), major (major), potpukovnik (lieutenant colonel), pukovnik (colonel),
- for generals: đeneral-major (major general), đeneral-potpukovnik (lieutenant colonel general), đeneral-pukovnik (colonel general) and đeneral Vojske (army general).

=== Generals and officers (1997–2000) ===
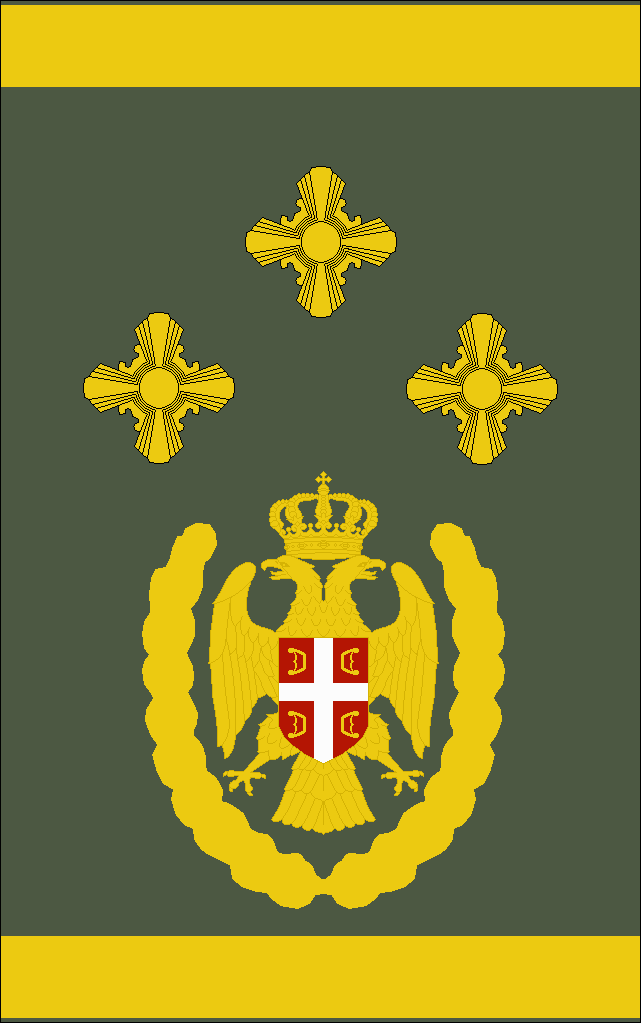
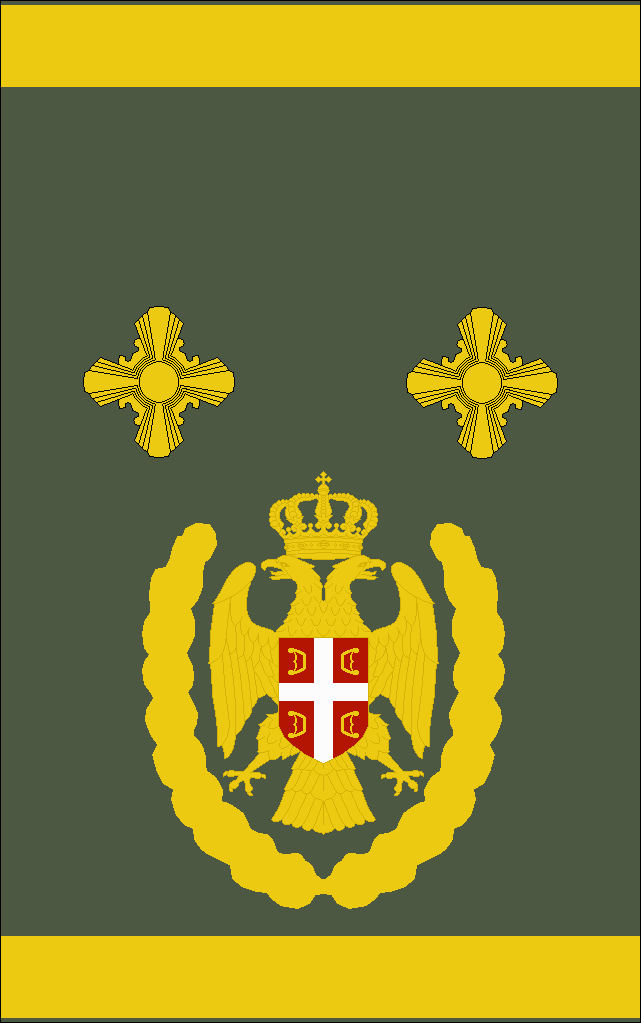
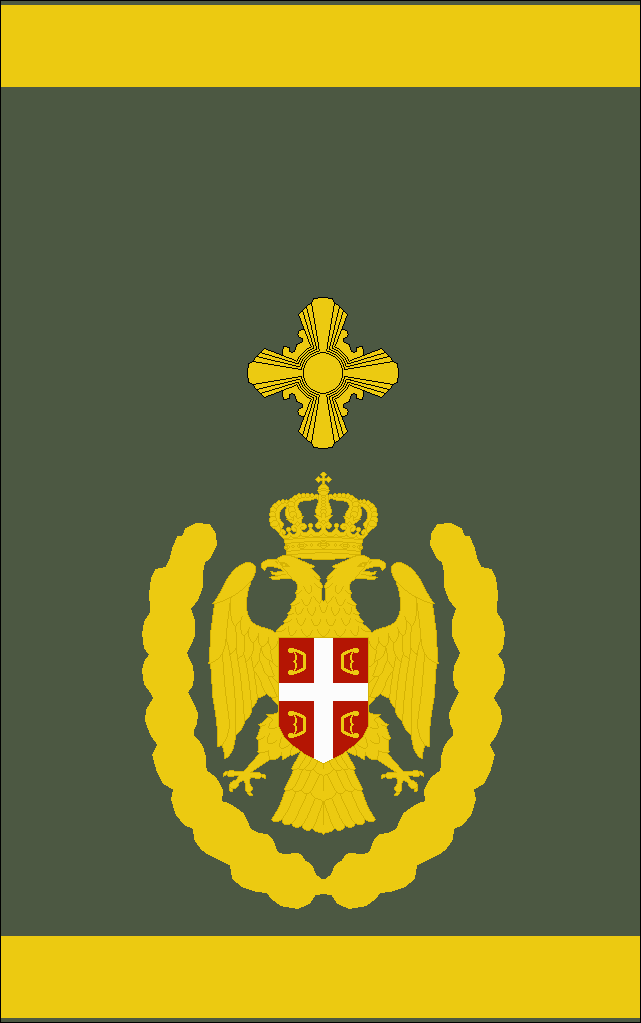
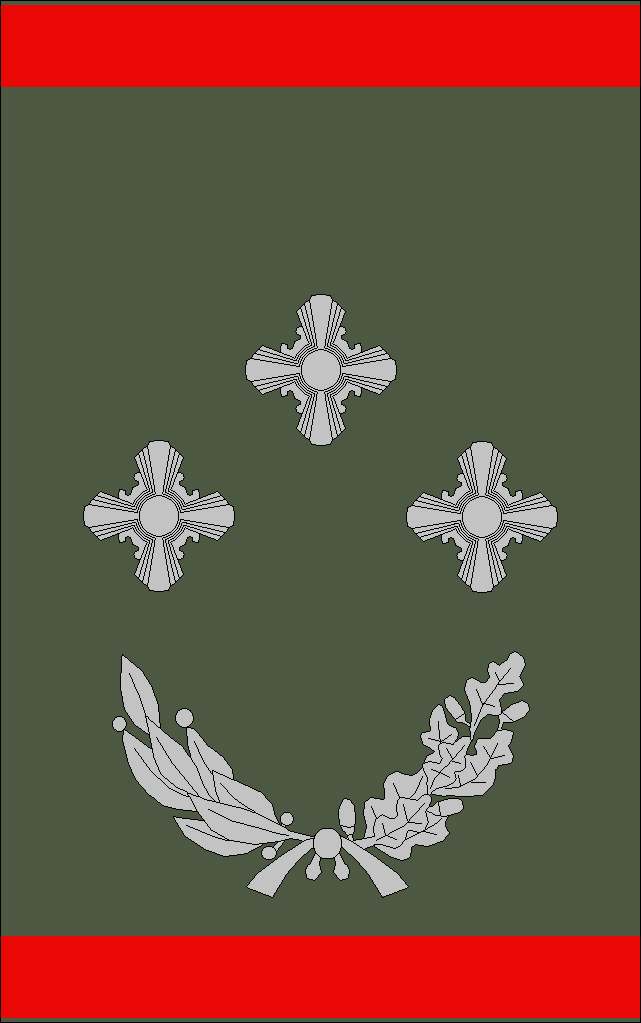
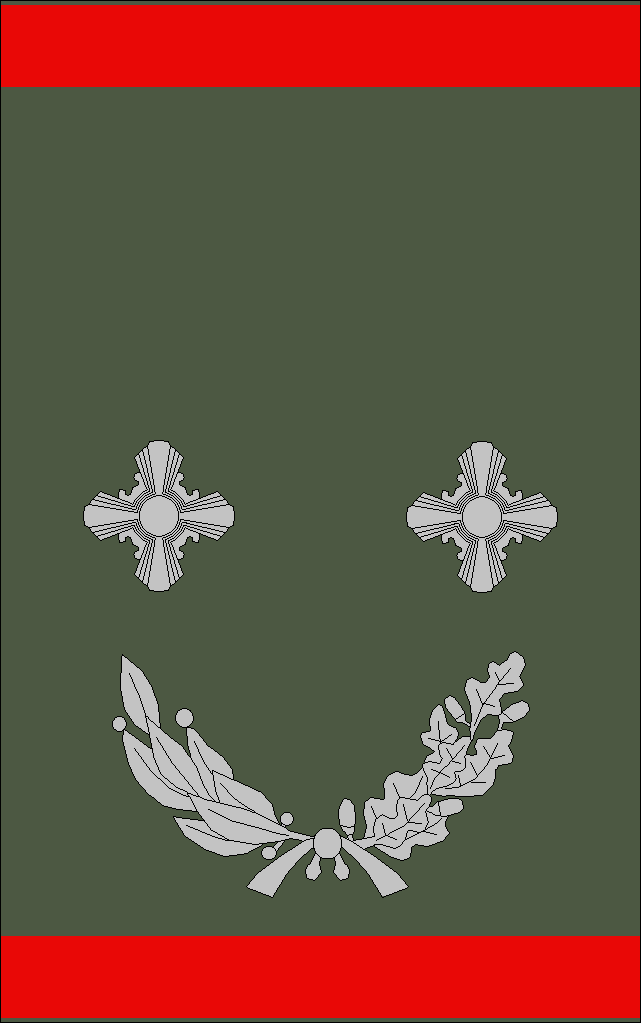
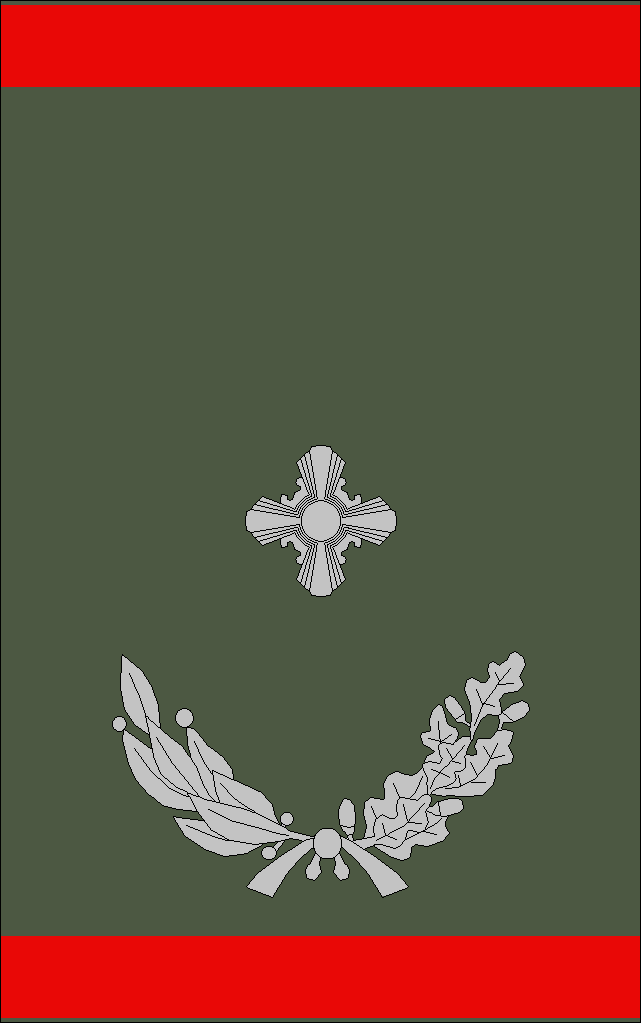
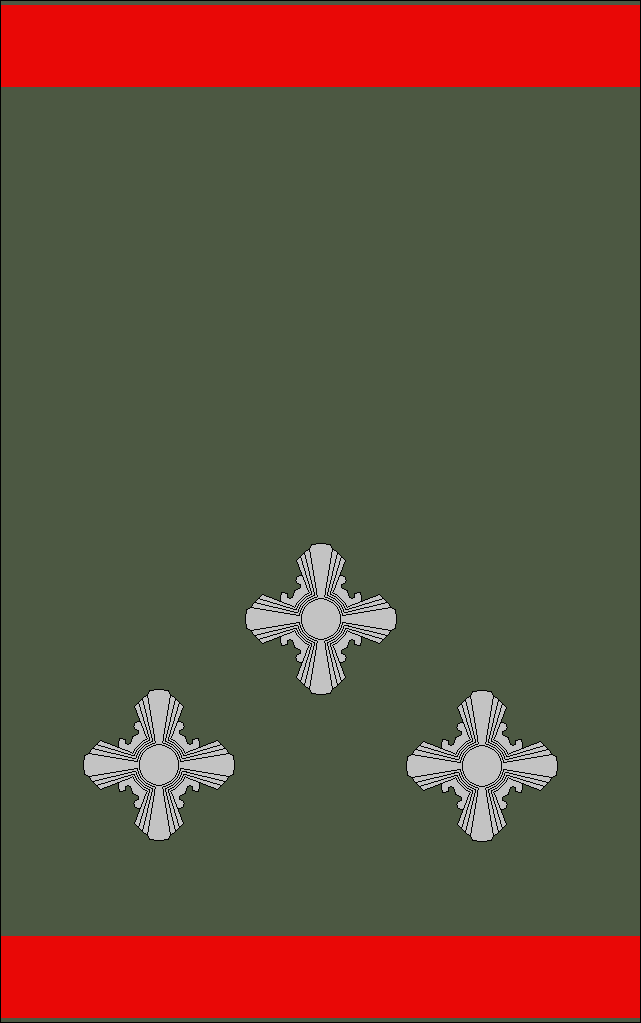
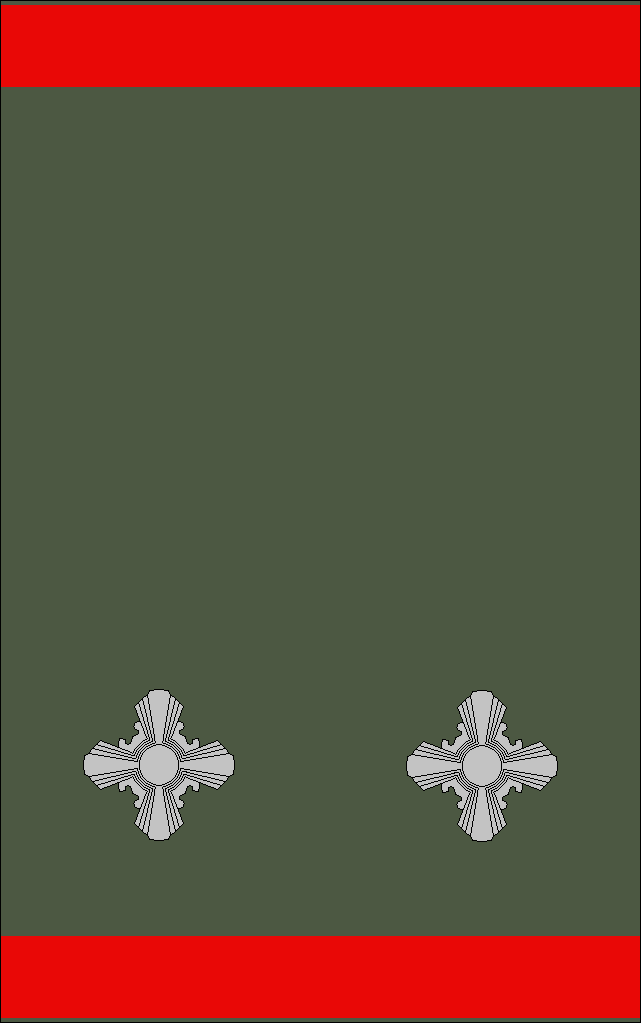
Rank group	General / flag officers				Senior officers			Junior officers
Republika Srpska	No insignia
Republika Srpska	Đeneral Vojske; Ђенерал војске	Đeneral-pukovnik; Ђенерал-пуковник	Đeneral-potpukovnik; Ђенерал-потпуковник	Đeneral-major; Ђенерал-мајор	Pukovnik; Пуковник	Potpukovnik; Потпуковник	Major; Мајор	Kapetan; Капетан	Poručnik; Поручник
Usual Translation	Army general	Colonel general	Lieutenant colonel general	Major general	Colonel	Lieutenant colonel	Major	Captain	Lieutenant

=== Non-commissioned officers (1997–2000) ===
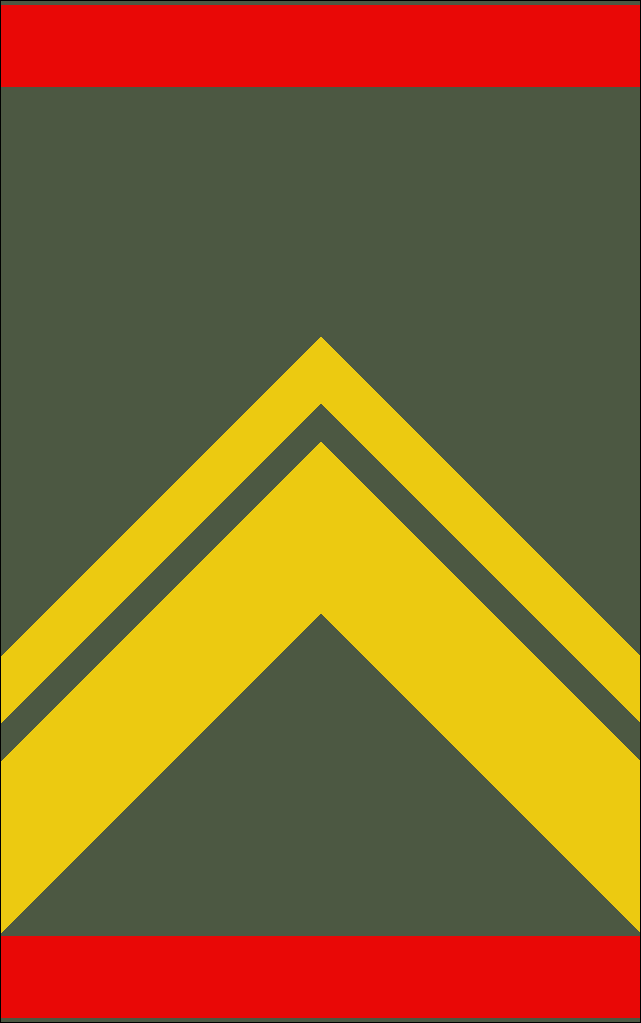
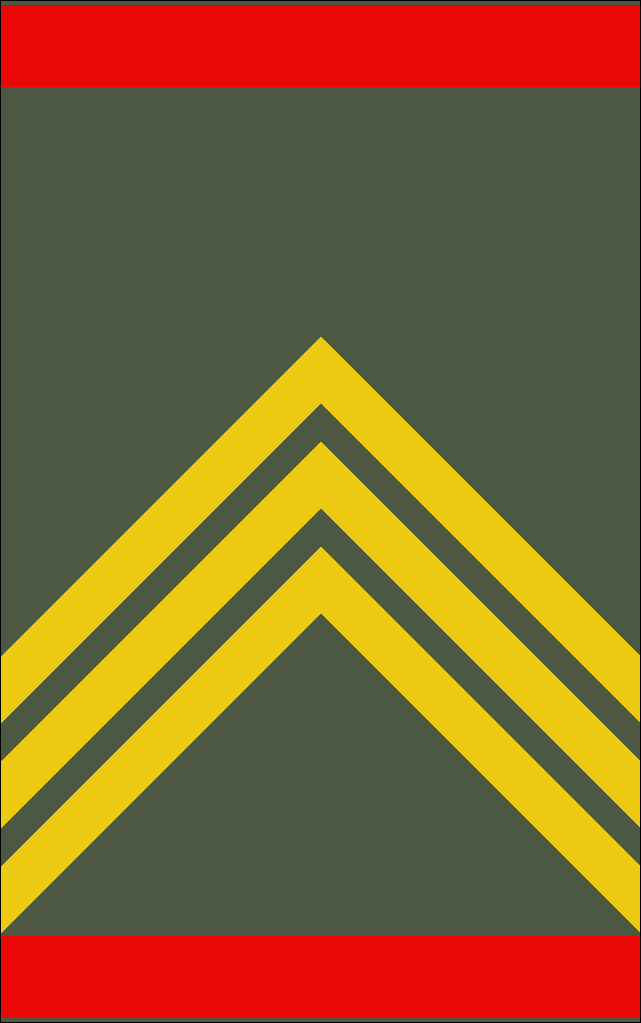
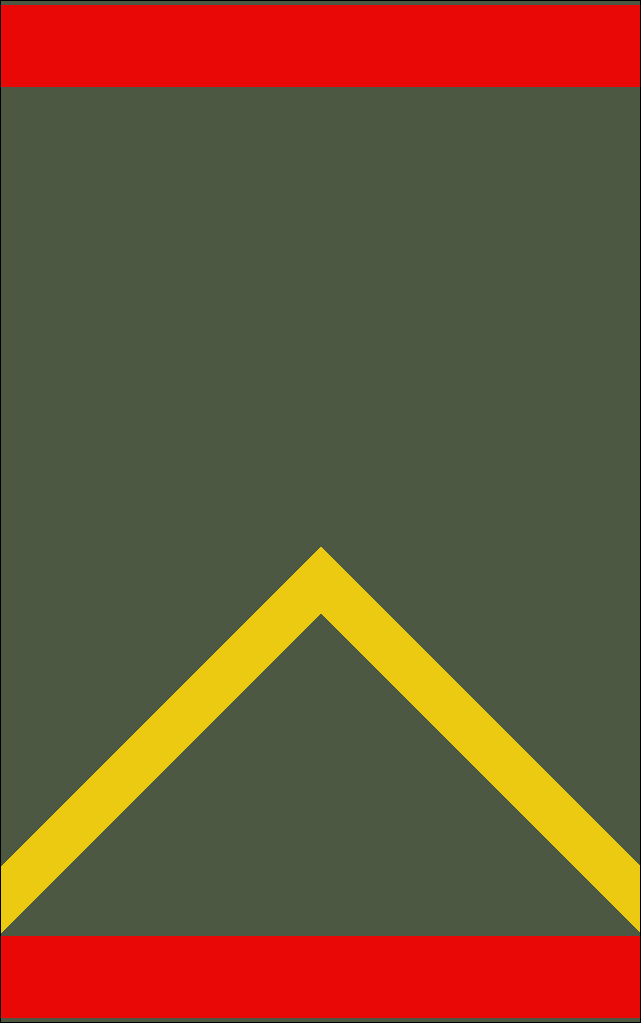
Rank group	Senior NCOs			Junior NCOs	Enlisted
Republika Srpska				No insignia	No insignia	No insignia
Republika Srpska	Zastavnik; Заставник	Stariji vodnik Старији водник	Vodnik; Водник	Mlađi vodnik Млађи водник	Vojnik prve klase Војник прве класе	Vojnik; Војник
Usual Translation	Warrant officer	Senior sergeant	Sergeant	Junior sergeant	Private first class	Private

== See also ==
- Army of Republika Srpska
