= Comparative air force officer ranks of Europe =

Rank comparison chart of all air forces of European states.

== Commissioned officer ranks ==
The rank insignia of commissioned officers.

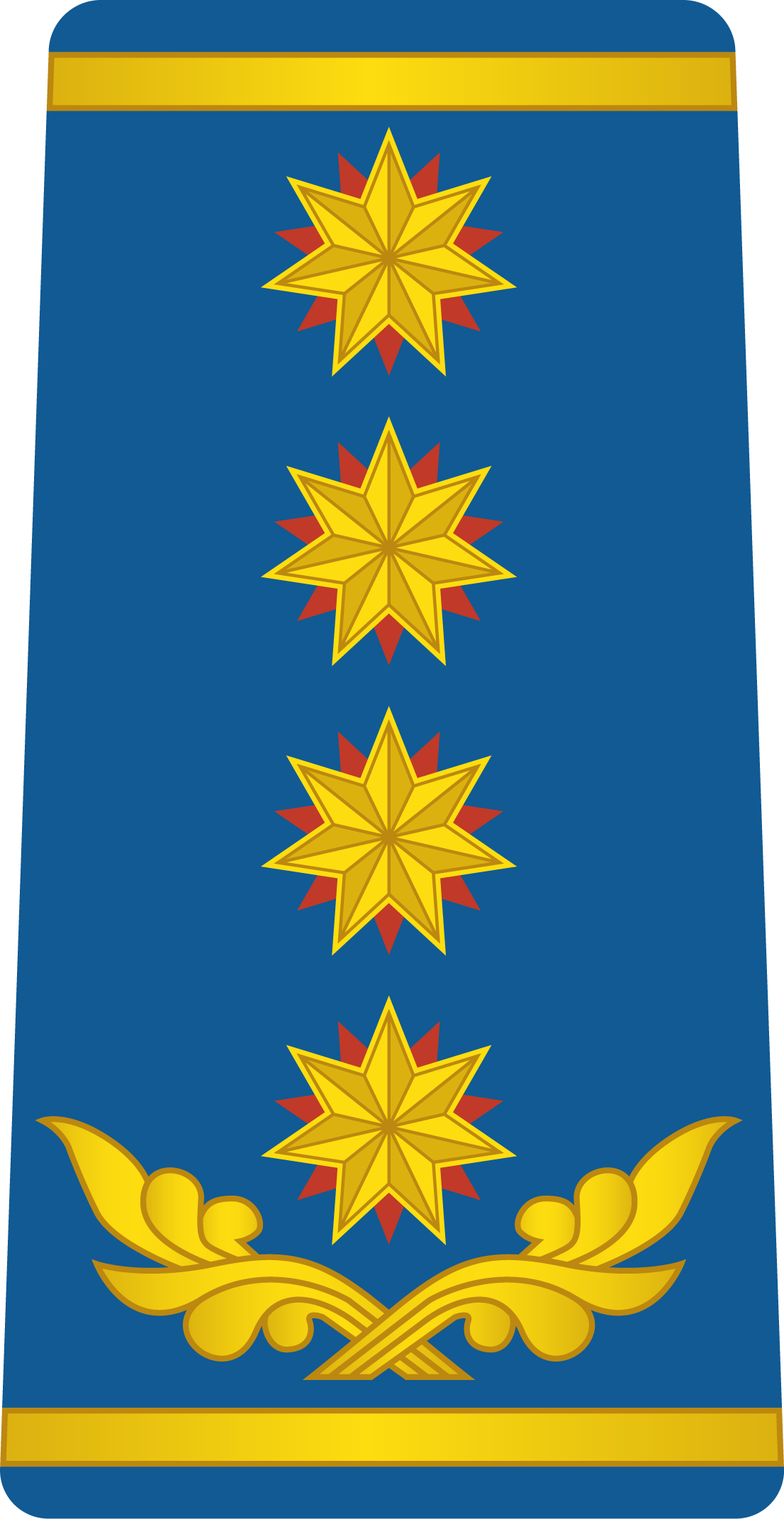
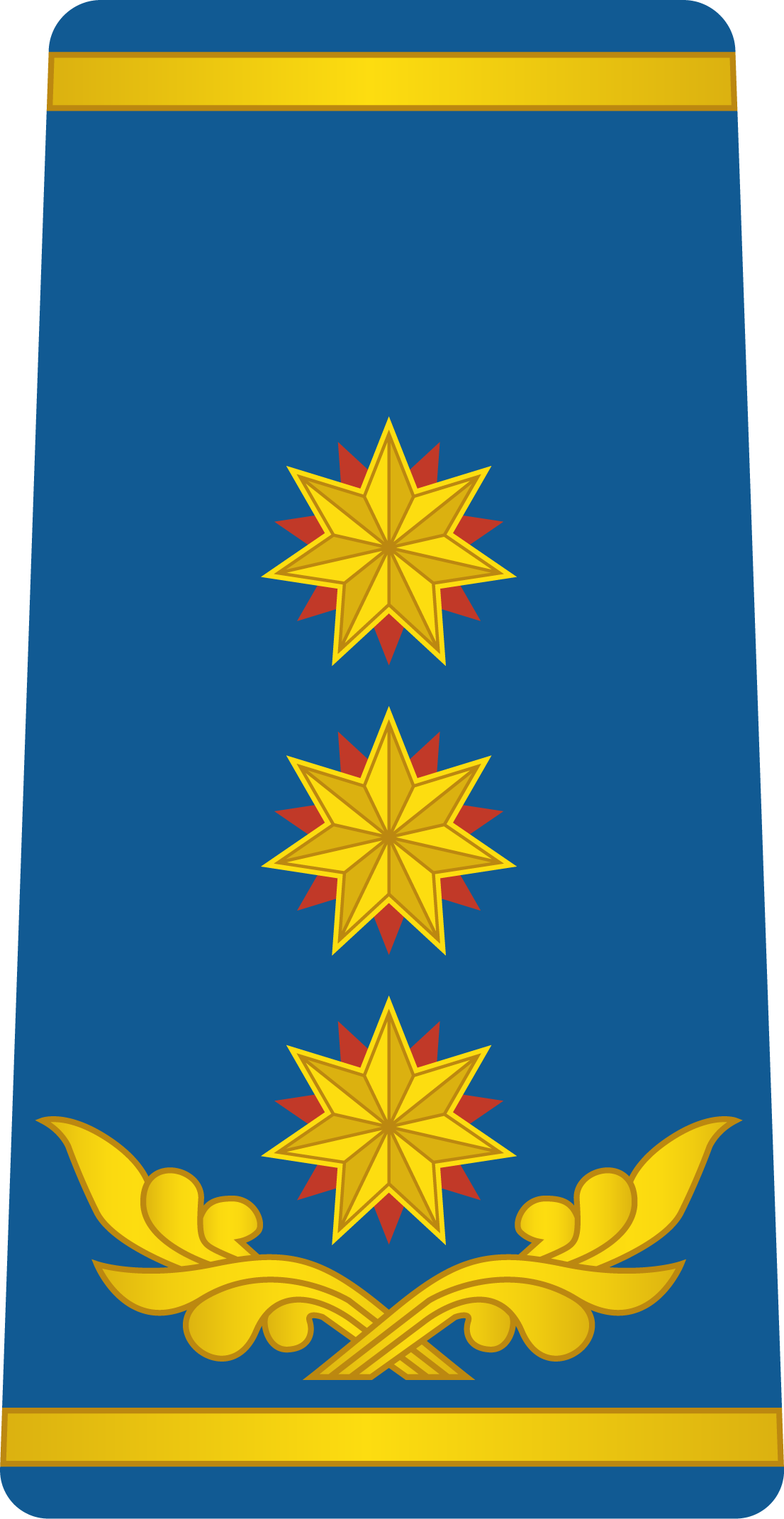
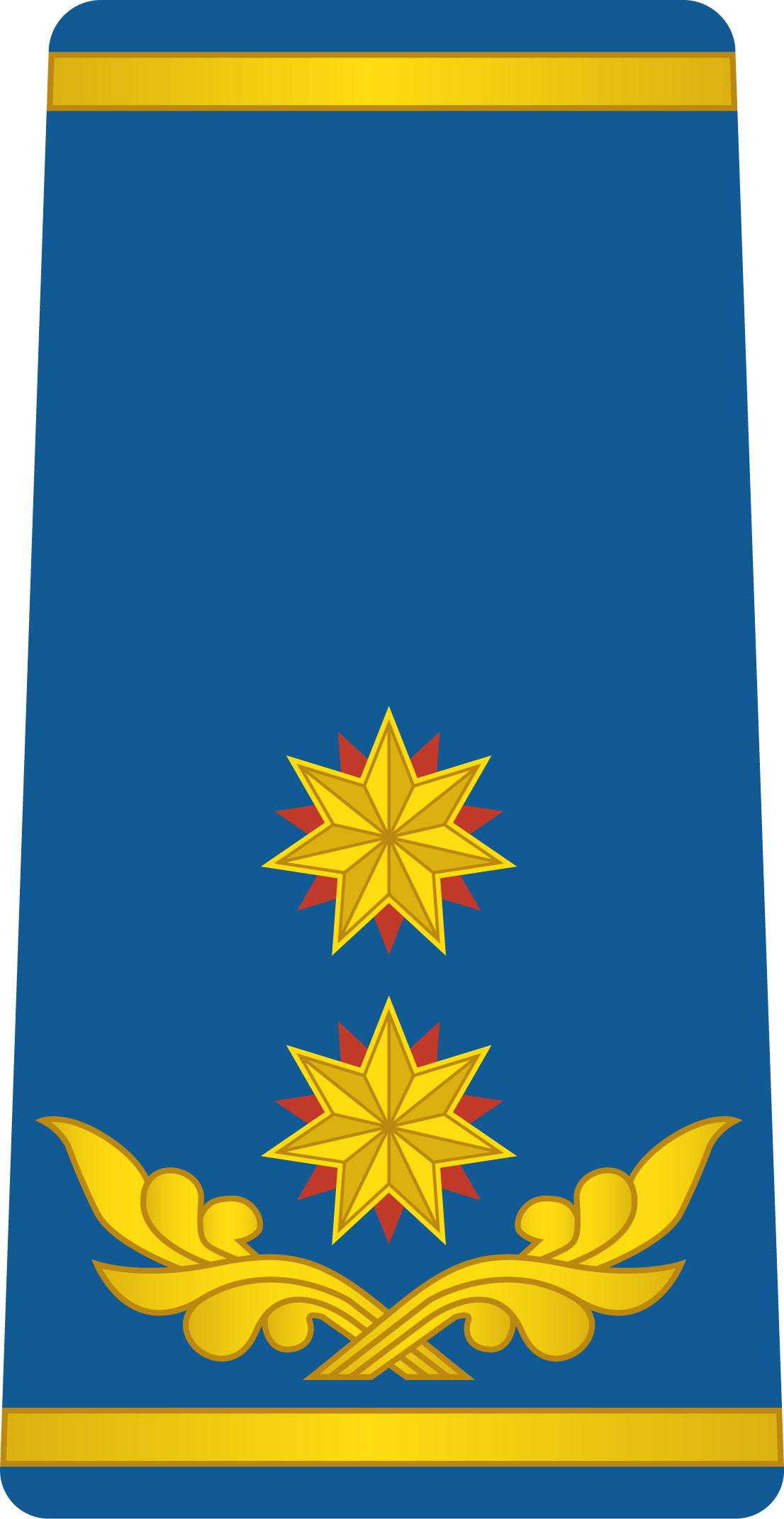
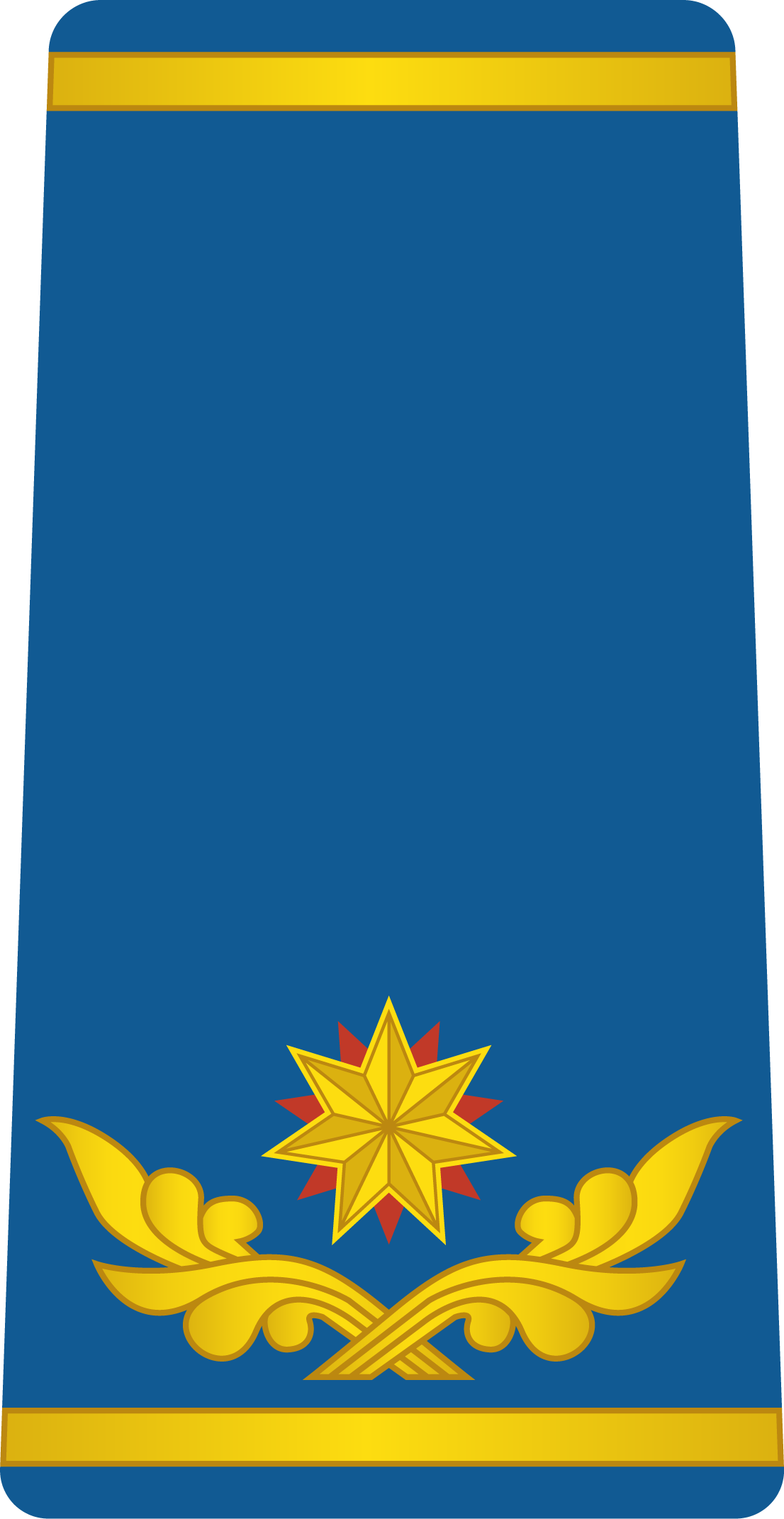
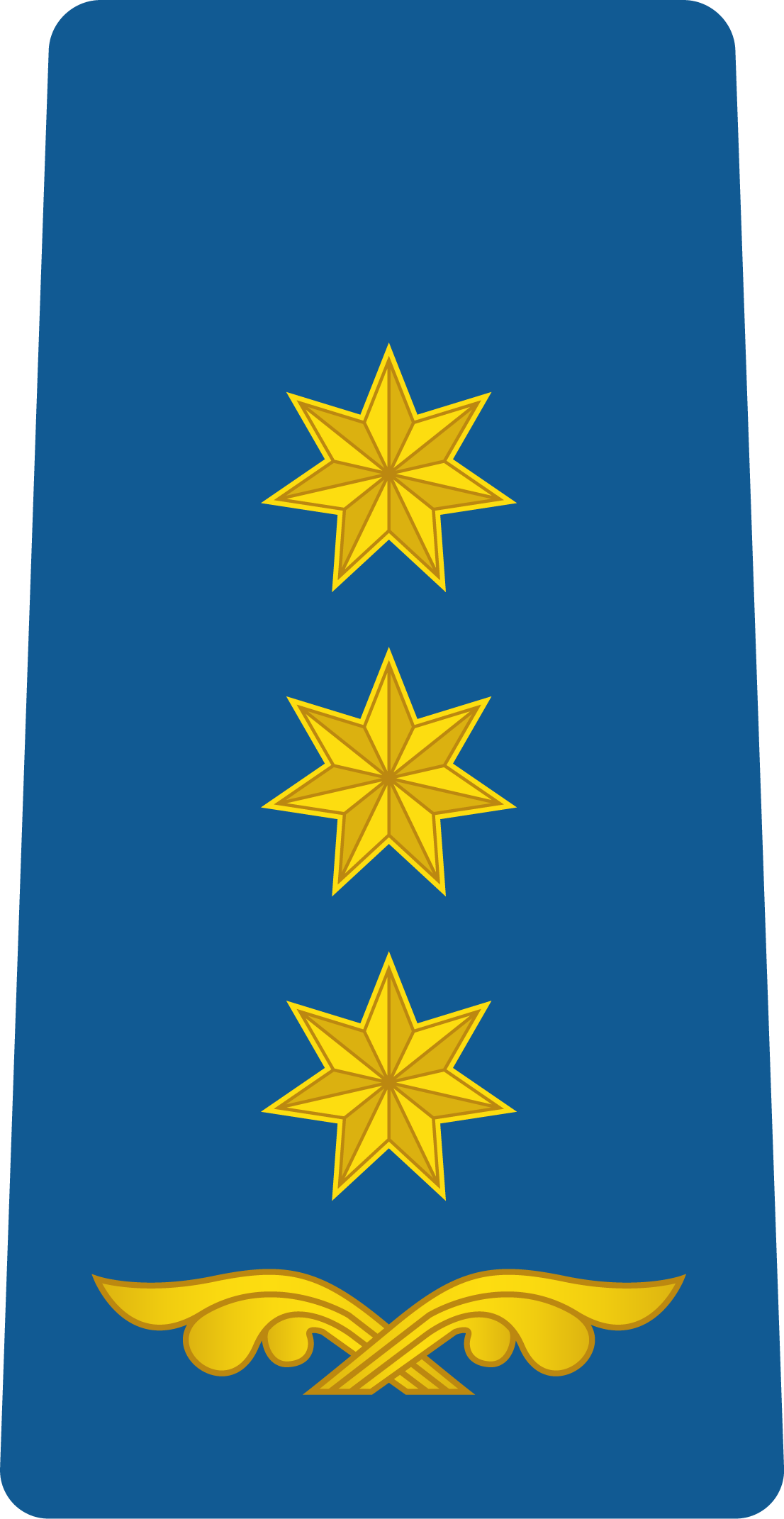
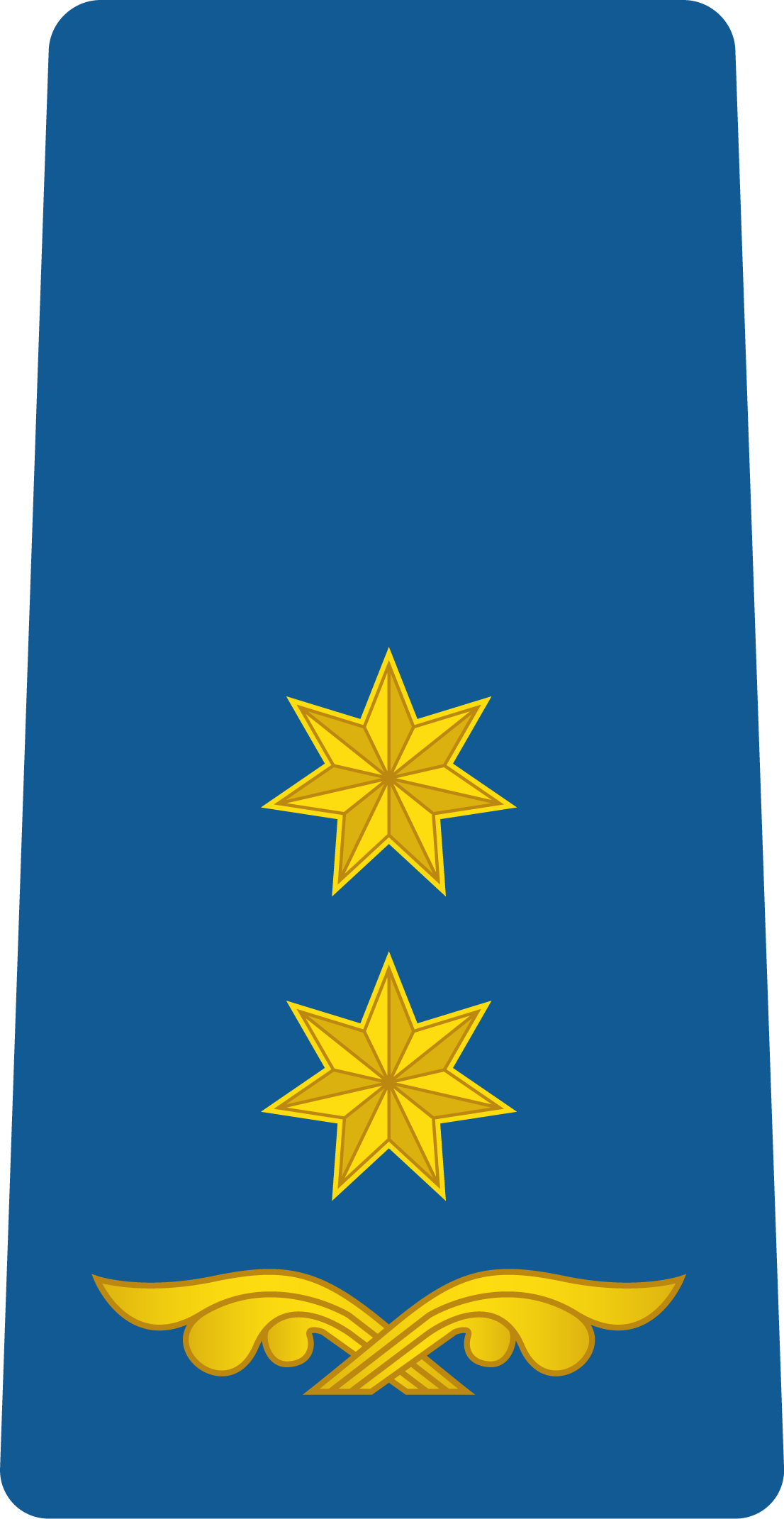
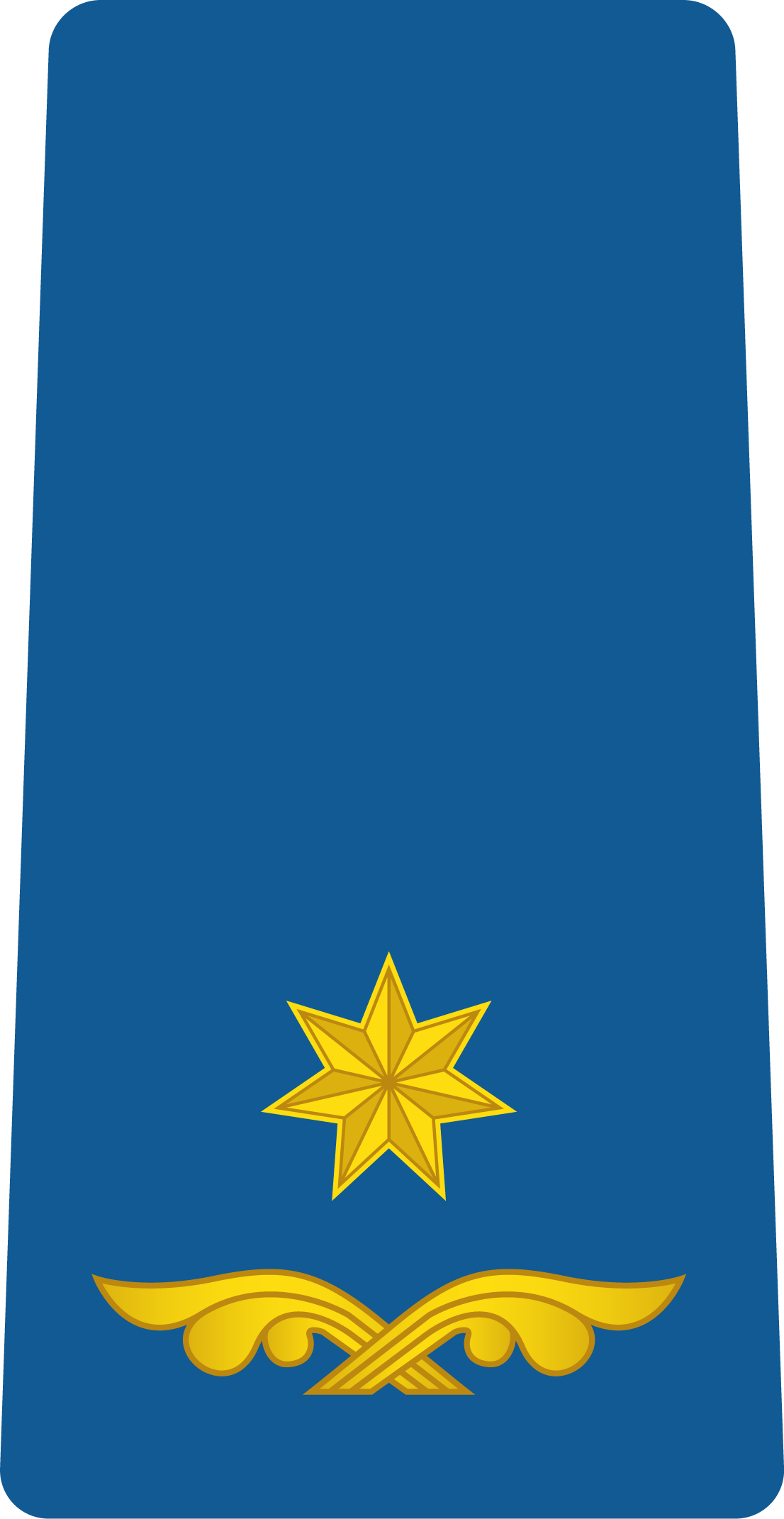
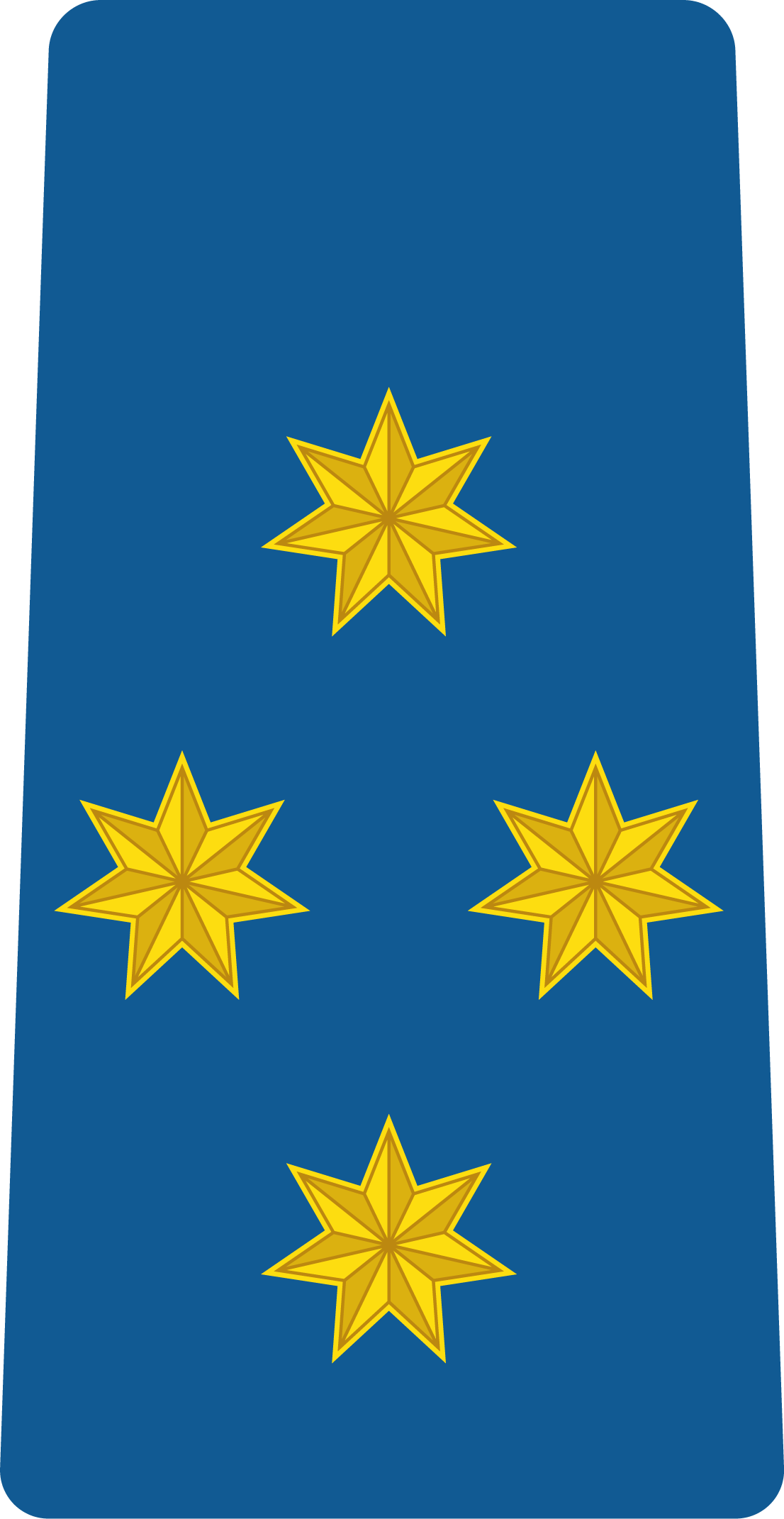
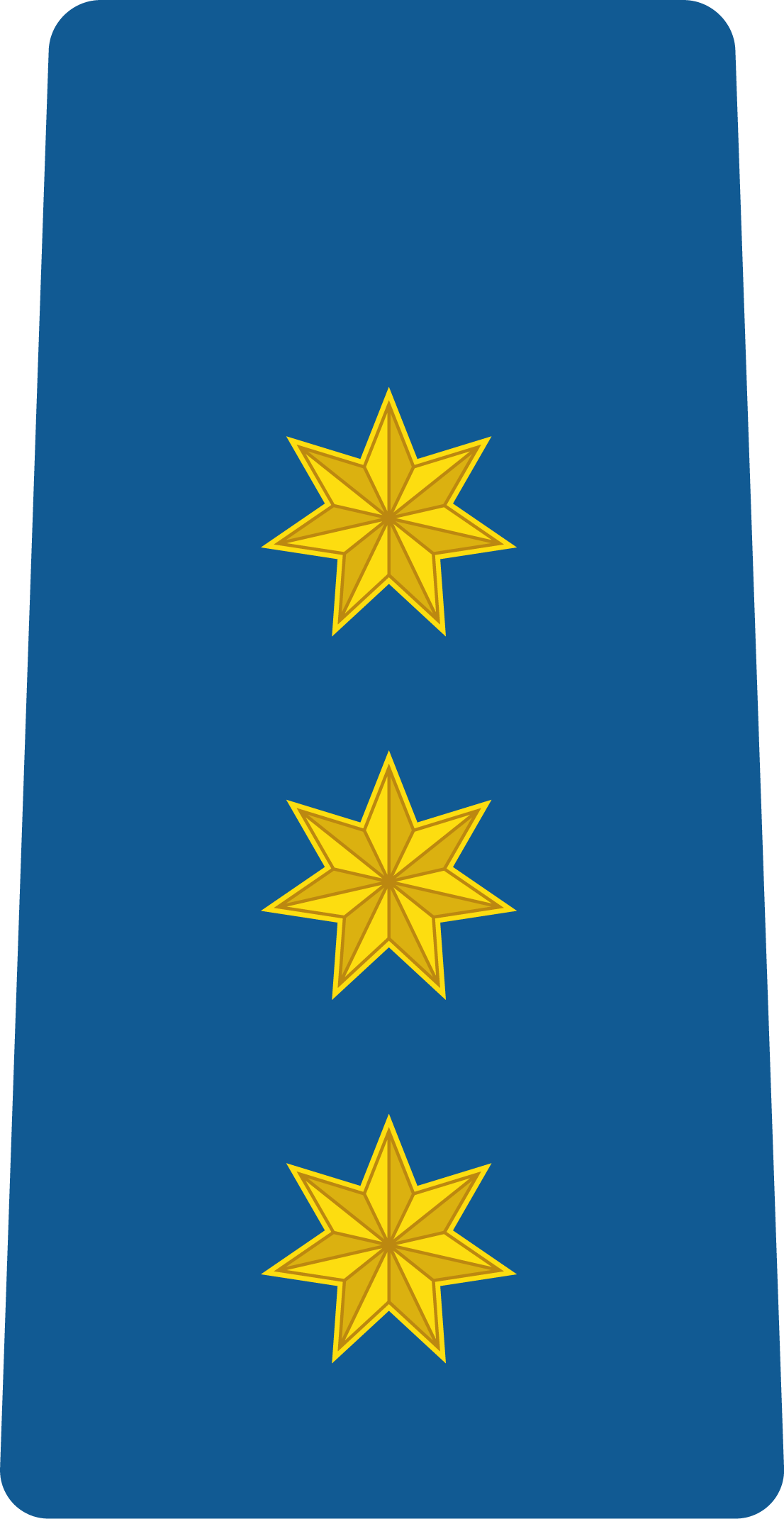
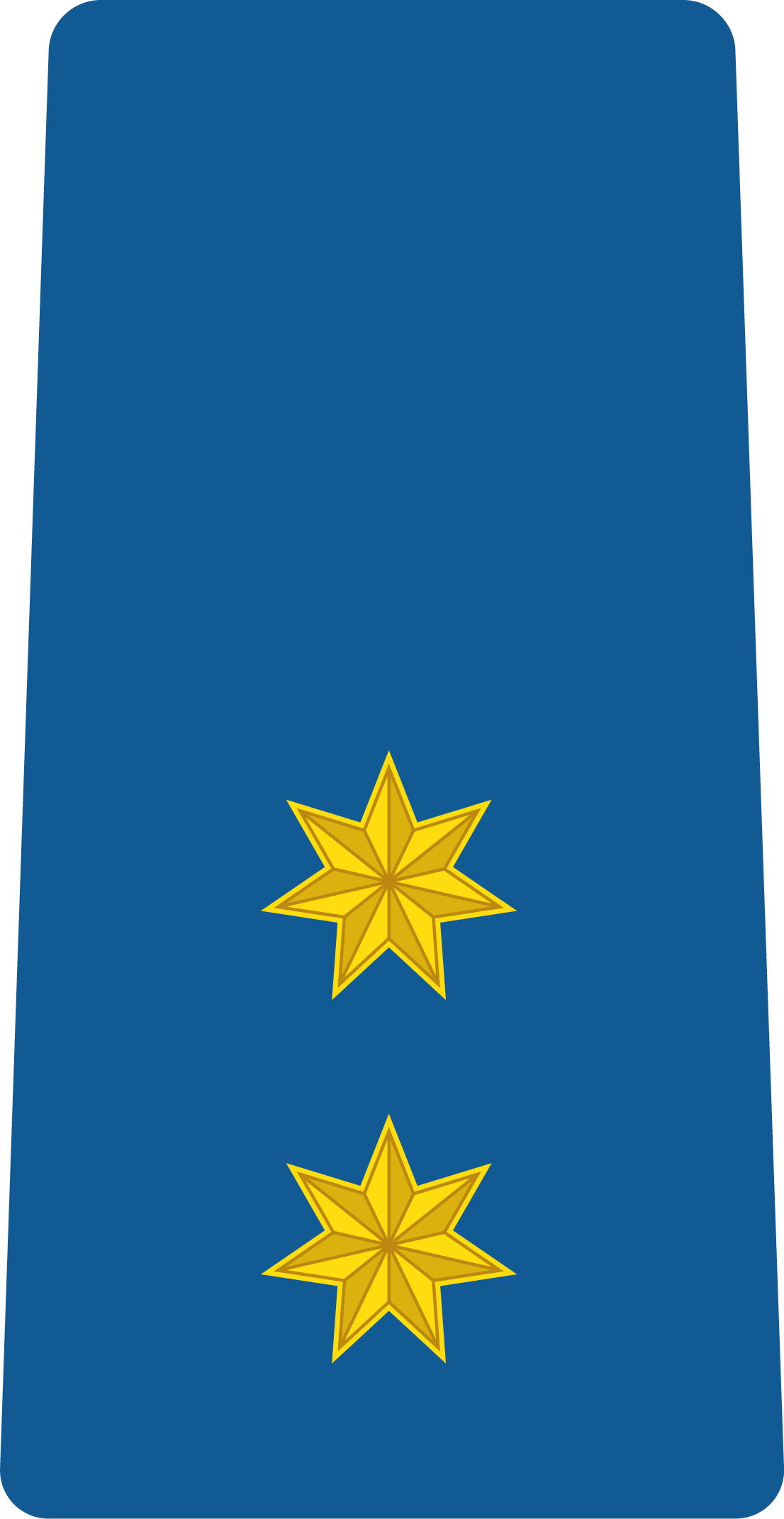
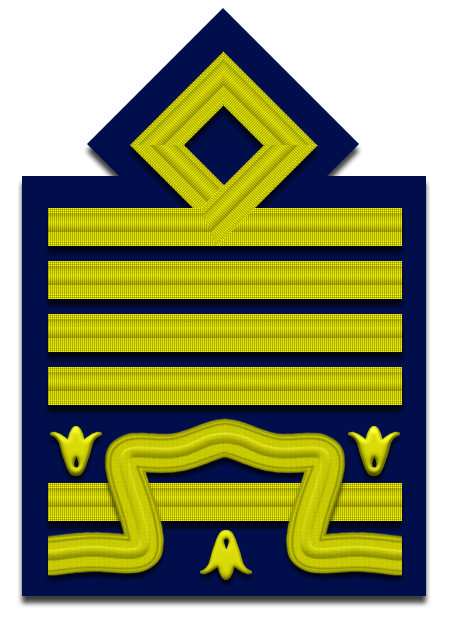
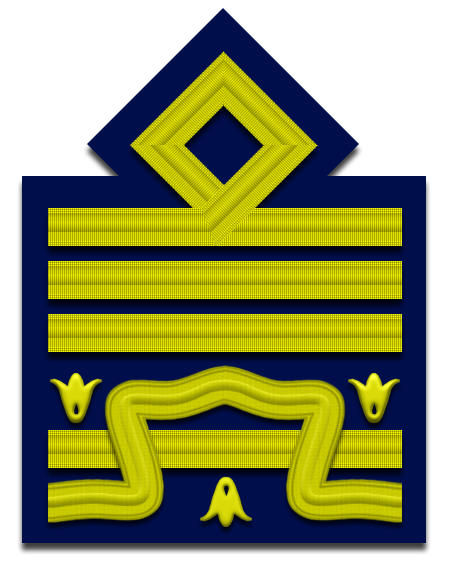
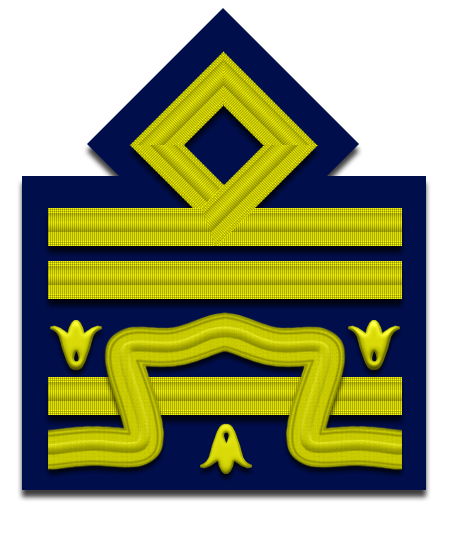
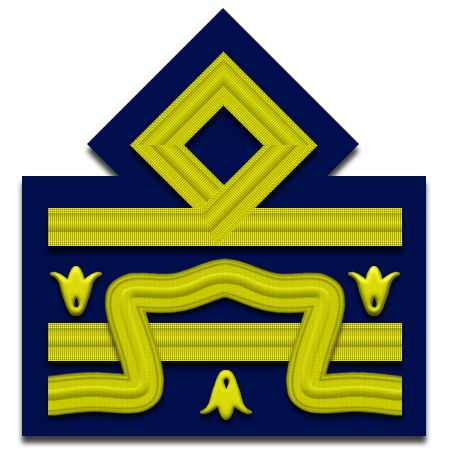
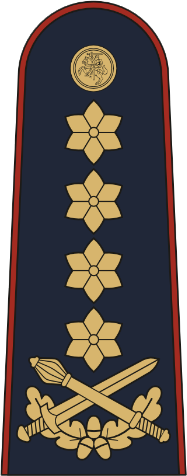
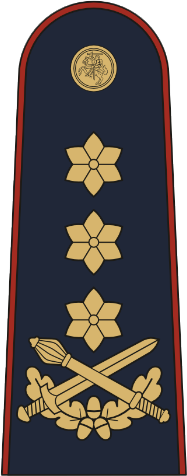
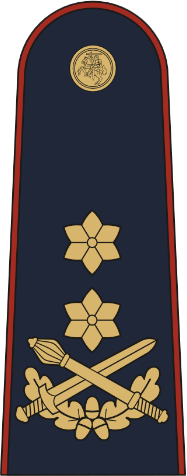
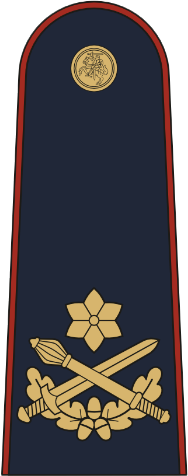
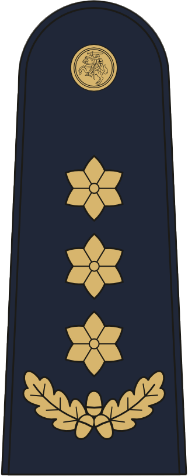
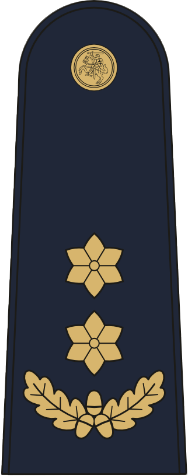
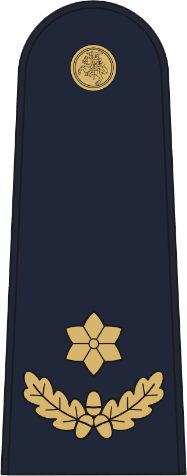
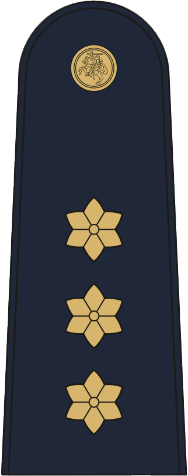
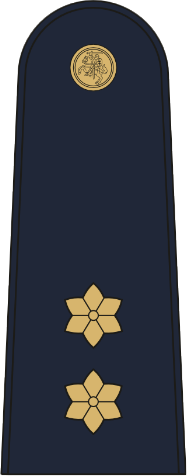
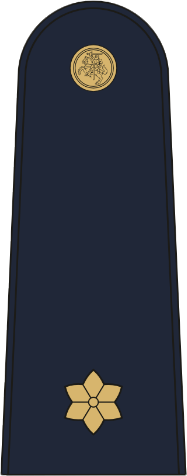
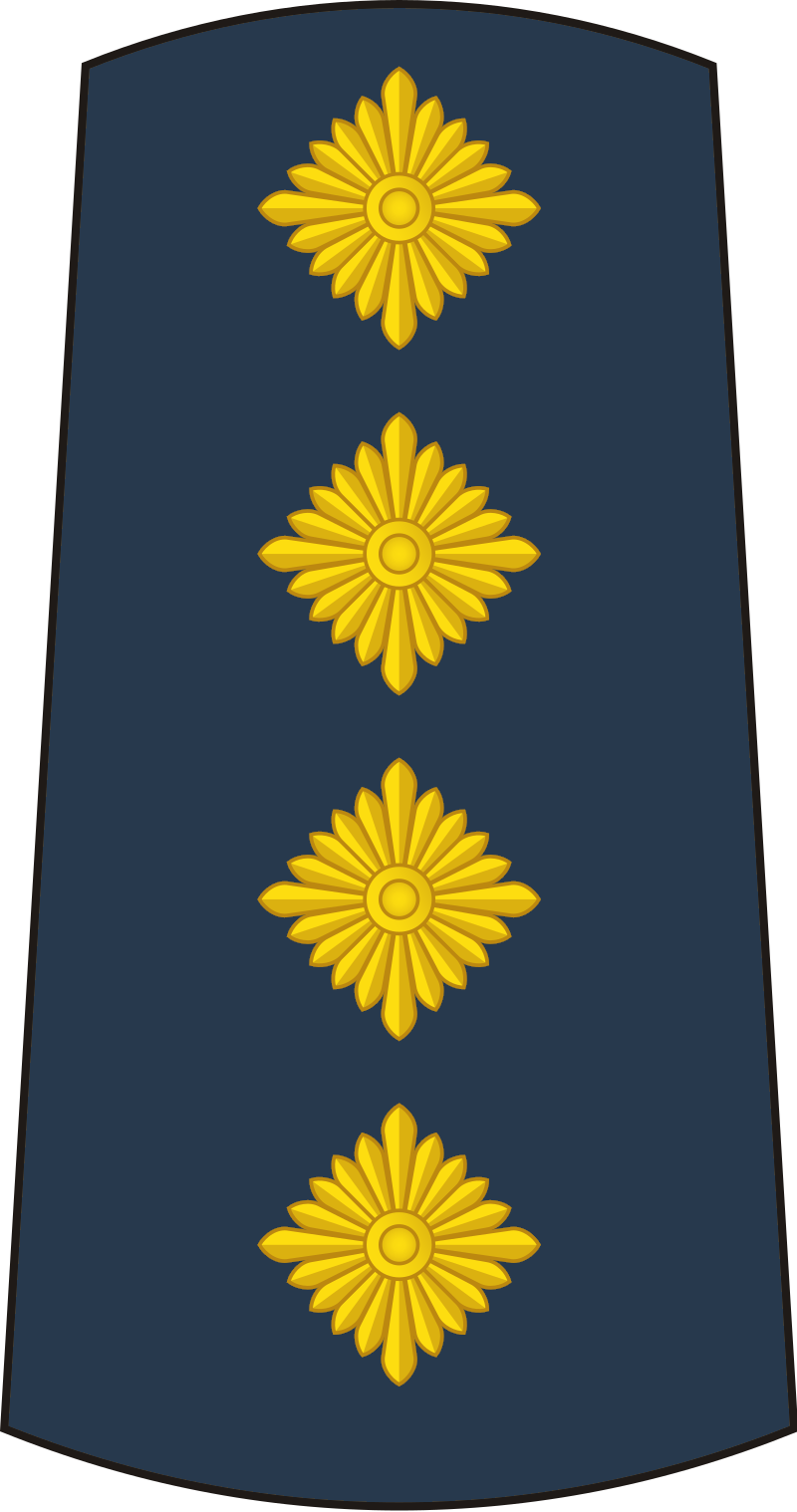
Rank group	General / flag officers					Senior officers				Junior officers
Albanian Air Force
Albanian Air Force			Gjeneral lejtant	Gjeneral major	Gjeneral brigade	Kolonel	Nënkolonel	Major		Kapiten		Toger		Nëntoger
Austrian Air Force
Austrian Air Force		General	Generalleutnant	Generalmajor	Brigadier	Oberst	Oberstleutnant	Major		Hauptmann		Oberleutnant		Leutnant
Belarusian Air Force
Belarusian Air Force			Ґенэрал-палкоўнік; G̀jeneral-palkoŭnik	Ґенэрал-лейтэнант; G̀jeneral-liejtenant	Ґенэрал-маёр; G̀jeneral-major	Палкоўнік; Palkoŭnik	Падпалкоўнік; Padpalkoŭnik	Маёр; Major		Капітан; Kapitan		Старшы лейтэнант Staršy liejtenant	Лейтэнант; Liejtenant	Малодшы лейтэнант Malodšy liejtenant
Belgian Air Component
Belgian Air Component		Generaal	Luitenant-generaal	Generaal-majoor	Brigadegeneraal	Kolonel	Luitenant-kolonel	Majoor	Kapitein-commandant	Kapitein		Luitenant		Onderluitenant
Belgian Air Component		Général	Lieutenant général	Général-major	Général de Brigade	Colonel	Lieutenant-colonel	Major	Capitaine-commandant	Capitaine		Lieutenant		Sous-lieutenant
Belgian Air Component		General	Generalleutnant	Generalmajor	Brigadegeneral	Oberst	Oberstleutnant	Major	Stabshauptmann	Hauptmann		Leutnant		Unterleutnant
Bulgarian Air Force
Bulgarian Air Force		Генерал; General	Генерал-лейтенант; General-leytenant	Генерал-майор; General-mayor	Бригаден генерал Brigaden general	Полковник; Polkovnik	Подполковник; Podpolkovnik	Майор; Mayor		Капитан; Kapitan		Старши лейтенант Starshi leytenant		Лейтенант; Leytenant
Croatian Air Force
Croatian Air Force	Stožerni general	General zbora	General pukovnik	General bojnik	Brigadni general	Brigadir	Pukovnik	Bojnik		Satnik		Natporučnik		Poručnik
Cyprus Air Forces
Cyprus Air Forces			Αντιπτέραρχος; Antipterarchos	Υποπτέραρχος; Ypopterarchos	Ταξίαρχος; Taxiarchos	Σμήναρχος; Sminarchos	Αντισμήναρχος; Antisminarchos	Επισμηναγός; Episminagos		Σμηναγός; Sminagos		Υποσμηναγός; Yposminagos	Ανθυποσμηναγός; Anthyposminagos
Czech Air Force
Czech Air Force		Armádní generál	Generálporučík	Generálmajor	Brigádní generál	Plukovník	Podplukovník	Major		Kapitán		Nadporučík		Poručík
Royal Danish Air Force
Royal Danish Air Force		General	Generalløjtnant	Generalmajor	Brigadegeneral	Oberst	Oberstløjtnant	Major		Kaptajn		Premierløjtnant	Løjtnant	Sekondløjtnant
Estonian Air Force
Estonian Air Force		Kindral	Kindralleitnant	Kindralmajor	Brigaadikindral	Kolonel	Kolonelleitnant	Major		Kapten		Leitnant	Nooremleitnant	Lipnik
French Air and Space Force
French Air and Space Force		Général d´armée aérienne	Général de corps aérien	Général de division aérienne	Général de brigade aérienne	Colonel	Lieutenant-colonel	Commandant		Capitaine		Lieutenant		Sous-lieutenant
Finnish Air Force
Finnish Air Force		Kenraali	Kenraaliluutnantti	Kenraalimajuri	Prikaatikenraali	Eversti	Everstiluutnantti	Majuri		Kapteeni		Yliluutnantti	Luutnantti	Vänrikki
Finnish Air Force		General	Generallöjtnant	Generalmajor	Brigadgeneral	Överste	Överstelöjtnant	Major		Kapten		Premiärlöjtnant	Löjtnant	Fänrik
Georgian Air Force
Georgian Air Force		არმიის გენერალი Armiis generali	გენერალ ლეიტენანტი General leit’enant’i	გენერალ მაიორი General maiori	ბრიგადის გენერალი Brigadis generali	პოლკოვნიკი P’olk’ovnik’i	ლეიტენანტ პოლკოვნიკი Leit’enant’ p’olk’ovnik’i	მაიორი Maiori		კაპიტანი K’ap’it’ani		უფროსი ლეიტენანტი Uprosi leit’enant’i		ლეიტენანტი Leit’enant’i
German Air Force
German Air Force		General	Generalleutnant	Generalmajor	Brigadegeneral	Oberst	Oberstleutnant	Major		Stabshauptmann	Hauptmann	Oberleutnant		Leutnant
Hellenic Air Force
Hellenic Air Force		Πτέραρχος; Pterarchos	Αντιπτέραρχος; Antipterarchos	Υποπτέραρχος; Ypopterarchos	Ταξίαρχος; Taxiarchos	Σμήναρχος; Sminarchos	Αντισμήναρχος; Antisminarchos	Επισμηναγός; Episminagos		Σμηναγός; Sminagos		Υποσμηναγός; Yposminagos		Ανθυποσμηναγός; Anthyposminagos
Rank group	General / flag officers					Senior officers				Junior officers
Hungarian Air Force
Hungarian Air Force		Vezérezredes	Altábornagy	Vezérőrnagy	Dandártábornok	Ezredes	Alezredes	Őrnagy		Százados		Főhadnagy		Hadnagy
Iceland	No air force
Irish Air Corps
Irish Air Corps			Lieutenant-general	Major-general	Brigadier-general	Colonel	Lieutenant-colonel	Commandant		Captain		Lieutenant		Second-lieutenant
Irish Air Corps			Lefteanant-ghinearál	Maor-ghinearál	Briogáidire-ghinearál	Cornal	Lefteanant-chornal	Ceannfort		Captaen		Lefteanant		Dara-lefteanant
Italian Air Force
Italian Air Force		Generale	Generale di squadra aerea	Generale di divisione aerea	Generale di brigata aerea	Colonnello	Tenente colonnello	Maggiore		Primo capitano	Capitano	Tenente		Sottotenente
Kosovo	No air force
Latvian Air Force
Latvian Air Force			Ģenerālleitnants	Ģenerālmajors	Brigādes ģenerālis	Pulkvedis	Pulkvežleitnants	Majors		Kapteinis		Virsleitnants		Leitnants
Liechtenstein	No air force
Lithuanian Air Force
Lithuanian Air Force		Generolas	Generolas leitenantas	Generolas majoras	Brigados generolas	Pulkininkas	Pulkininkas leitenantas	Majoras		Kapitonas		Vyresnysis leitenantas		Leitenantas
Luxembourg	No air force
North Macedonia Air Force
North Macedonia Air Force		Генерал; General	Генерал-потполковник; General-potpolkovnik	Генерал-мајор; General-major	Бригаден генерал Brigaden general	Полковник; Polkovnik	Потполковник; Potpolkovnik	Мајор; Major		Капетан; Kapetan		Поручник; Poručnik		Потпоручник; Potporučnik
Moldova Air Force
Moldova Air Force			General de corp de armată	General de divizie	General de brigadă	Colonel	Locotenent-colonel	Maior		Căpitan		Locotenent-major		Locotenent
Monaco	No air force
Montenegrin Air Force
Montenegrin Air Force		General pukovnik	General potpukovnik	General major	Brigadir general	Pukovnik	Potpukovnik	Major		Kapetan		Poručnik		Potporučnik
Royal Netherlands Air Force
Royal Netherlands Air Force		Generaal	Luitenant-generaal	Generaal-majoor	Commodore	Kolonel	Luitenant-kolonel	Majoor		Kapitein		Eerste luitenant		Tweede luitenant
Royal Norwegian Air Force
Royal Norwegian Air Force		General	Generalløytnant	Generalmajor	Brigader	Oberst	Oberstløytnant	Major		Kaptein		Løytnant		Fenrik
Polish Air Force
Polish Air Force	Marszałek Polski	Generał	Generał broni	Generał dywizji	Generał brygady	Pułkownik	Podpułkownik	Major		Kapitan		Porucznik		Podporucznik
Rank group	General / flag officers					Senior officers				Junior officers
Portuguese Air Force
Portuguese Air Force	Marechal da Força Aérea	General	Tenente-general	Major-general	Brigadeiro-general	Coronel	Tenente-coronel	Major		Capitão		Tenente		Alferes
Romanian Air Force
Romanian Air Force	Mareșal	General	General-locotenent	General-maior	General de flotilă aeriană	Comandor	Căpitan-comandor	Locotenent-comandor		Căpitan		Locotenent		Sublocotenent
Russian Aerospace Forces
Russian Aerospace Forces		Генера́л а́рмии Generál ármii	Генера́л-полко́вник; Generál-polkóvnik	Генера́л-лейтена́нт; Generál-leytenánt	Генера́л-майо́р; Generál-mayór	Полко́вник; Polkóvnik	Подполко́вник; Podpolkóvnik	Майо́р; Majór		Kапита́н; Kapitán		Старший лейтена́нт Stárshiy leytenánt	Лейтенант; Leytenant	Mла́дший лейтена́нт Mládshiy leytenánt
San Marino	No air force
Serbian Air Force and Air Defence
Serbian Air Force and Air Defence		Генерал; General	Генерал-потпуковник; General-potpukovnik	Генерал-мајор; General-major	Бригадни генерал Brigadni general	Пуковник; Pukovnik	Потпуковник; Potpukovnik	Мајор; Major		Капетан прве класе Kapetan prve klase	Капетан; Kapetan	Поручник; Poručnik		Потпоручник; Potporučnik
(Slovakia) Slovak Air Force
(Slovakia) Slovak Air Force		Generál	Generálporučík (Note: The appropriate branch of service badge is pinned just under the top button of the for all ranks excluding full General.)	Generálmajor	Brigádny generál	Plukovník	Podplukovník	Major		Kapitán		Nadporučík		Poručík
(Slovenia) Slovenian Air Force and Air Defence
(Slovenia) Slovenian Air Force and Air Defence		General polkovnik	Generalpodpolkovnik	Generalmajor	Brigadni general	Polkovnik	Podpolkovnik	Major		Stotnik		Nadporočnik		Poročnik
Spanish Air and Space Force
Spanish Air and Space Force	Capitán general	General del aire	Teniente general	General de división	General de brigada	Coronel	Teniente coronel	Comandante		Capitán		Teniente		Alférez
Swedish Air Force
Swedish Air Force		General	Generallöjtnant	Generalmajor	Brigadgeneral	Överste	Överstelöjtnant	Major		Kapten		Löjtnant		Fänrik
Swiss Air Force
Swiss Air Force		General	Korpskommandant	Divisionär	Brigadier	Oberst	Oberstleutnant	Major		Hauptmann		Oberleutnant		Leutnant
Swiss Air Force		Général	Commandant de corps	Divisionnaire	Brigadier	Colonel	Lieutenant-colonel	Major		Capitaine		Premier-lieutenant		Lieutenant
Turkish Air Force
Turkish Air Force	Mareşal	Orgeneral	Korgeneral	Tümgeneral	Tuğgeneral	Albay	Yarbay	Binbaşı		Yüzbaşı		Üsteğmen	Teğmen	Asteğmen
Ukrainian Air Force
Ukrainian Air Force		Генерал; Heneral	Генерал-лейтенант; Heneral-leytenant	Генерал-майор; Heneral-mayor	Бригадний генерал Bryhadnyy heneral	Полковник; Polkovnyk	Підполковник; Pidpolkovnyk	Майор; Mayor		Капітан; Kapitan		Старший лейтенант Starshyy leytenant	Лейтенант; Leytenant	Молодший лейтенант Molodshyy leytenant
Royal Air Force
Royal Air Force	Marshal of the RAF	Air chief marshal	Air marshal	Air vice-marshal	Air commodore	Group captain	Wing commander	Squadron leader		Flight lieutenant		Flying officer		Pilot officer /acting pilot officer
Vatican City	No air force
Rank group	General / flag officers					Senior officers				Junior officers

== See also ==
- Air force officer rank insignia
- Military rank
- Comparative air force officer ranks of the Americas
- Comparative air force officer ranks of Asia
- Ranks and insignia of NATO air forces officers
