= Ranks and insignia of NATO air forces officers =

The following table lists the ranks and insignia of officers in NATO air forces.

== Officers (OF 1–10) ==
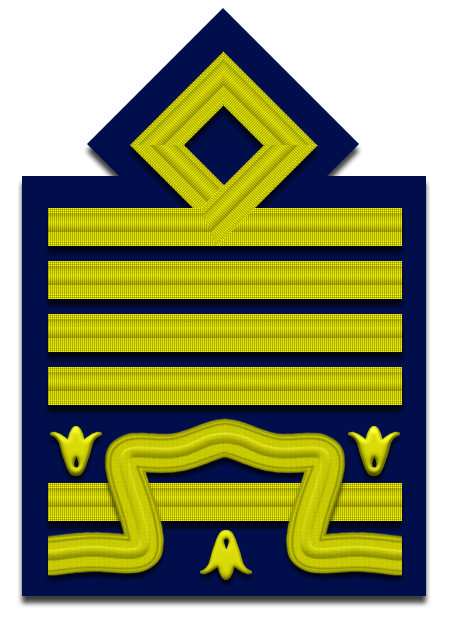
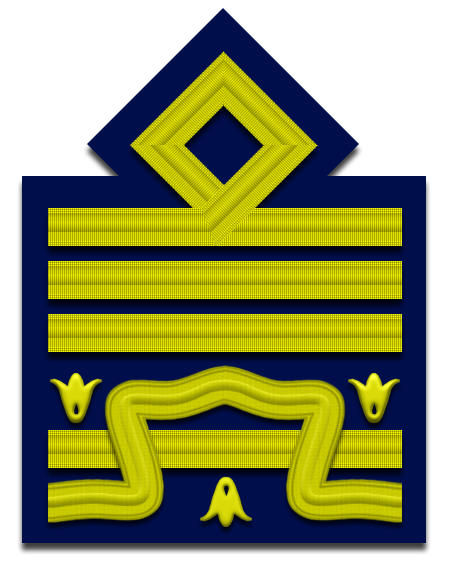
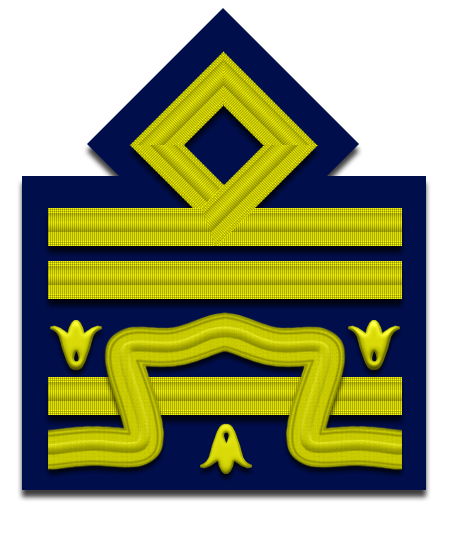
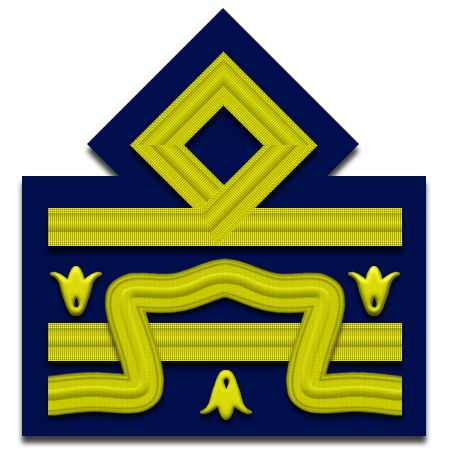
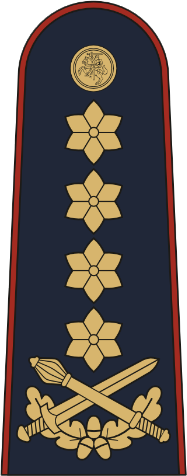
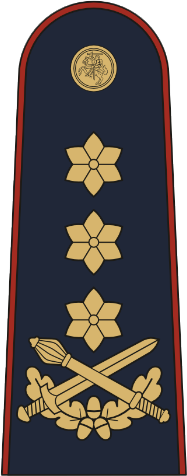
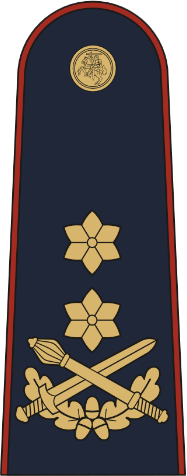
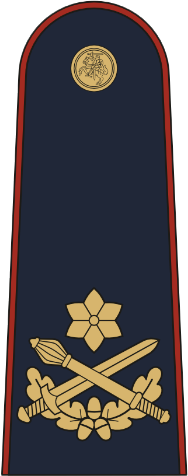
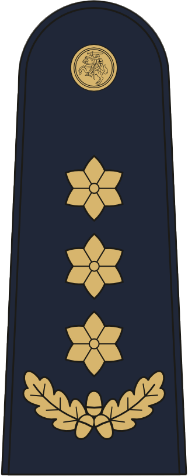
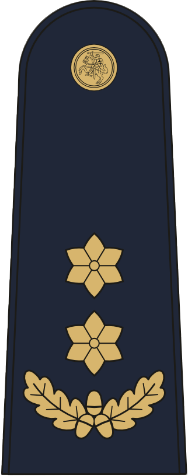
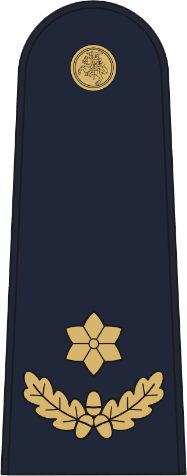
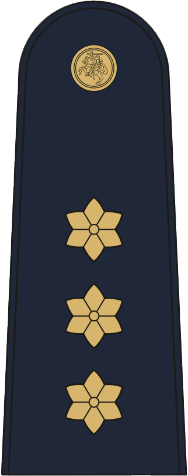
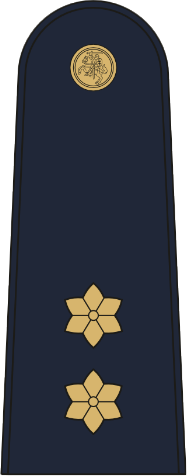
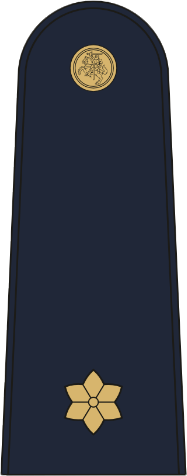
| NATO code | OF-10 | OF-9 | OF-8 | OF-7 | OF-6 | OF-5 | OF-4 | OF-3 | | OF-2 | | OF-1 |
|---|---|---|---|---|---|---|---|---|---|---|---|---|---|---|
| Albanian Air Force |
| Albanian Air Force | | | Gjeneral lejtant | Gjeneral major | Gjeneral brigade | Kolonel | Nënkolonel | Major | | Kapiten | | Toger | | Nëntoger |
| Belgian Air Component |
| Belgian Air Component | | Generaal | Luitenant-generaal | Generaal-majoor | Brigadegeneraal | Kolonel | Luitenant-kolonel | Majoor | Kapitein-commandant | Kapitein | | Luitenant | | Onderluitenant |
| Belgian Air Component | | Général | Lieutenant général | Général-major | Général de Brigade | Colonel | Lieutenant-colonel | Major | Capitaine-commandant | Capitaine | | Lieutenant | | Sous-lieutenant |
| Belgian Air Component | | General | Generalleutnant | Generalmajor | Brigadegeneral | Oberst | Oberstleutnant | Major | Stabshauptmann | Hauptmann | | Leutnant | | Unterleutnant |
| Bulgarian Air Force |
| Bulgarian Air Force | | Генерал; General | Генерал-лейтенант; General-leytenant | Генерал-майор; General-mayor | Бригаден генерал Brigaden general | Полковник; Polkovnik | Подполковник; Podpolkovnik | Майор; Mayor | | Капитан; Kapitan | | Старши лейтенант Starshi leytenant | | Лейтенант; Leytenant |
| Royal Canadian Air Force |
| Royal Canadian Air Force | | General | Lieutenant-general | Major-general | Brigadier-general | Colonel | Lieutenant-colonel | Major | | Captain | | Lieutenant | | Second lieutenant |
| Royal Canadian Air Force | | Général(e) | Lieutenant(e)-général(e) | Major(e)-général(e) | Brigadier(ère)-général(e) | Colonel(le) | Lieutenant(e)-colonel(le) | Major(e) | | Capitaine | | Lieutenant(e) | | Sous-lieutenant(e) |
| Croatian Air Force |
| Croatian Air Force | Stožerni general | General zbora | General pukovnik | General bojnik | Brigadni general | Brigadir | Pukovnik | Bojnik | | Satnik | | Natporučnik | | Poručnik |
| Czech Air Force |
| Czech Air Force | | Armádní generál | Generálporučík | Generálmajor | Brigádní generál | Plukovník | Podplukovník | Major | | Kapitán | | Nadporučík | | Poručík |
| Royal Danish Air Force |
| Royal Danish Air Force | | General | Generalløjtnant | Generalmajor | Brigadegeneral | Oberst | Oberstløjtnant | Major | | Kaptajn | | Premierløjtnant | Løjtnant | Sekondløjtnant |
| Estonian Air Force |
| Estonian Air Force | | Kindral | Kindralleitnant | Kindralmajor | Brigaadikindral | Kolonel | Kolonelleitnant | Major | | Kapten | | Leitnant | Nooremleitnant | Lipnik |
| NATO code | OF-10 | OF-9 | OF-8 | OF-7 | OF-6 | OF-5 | OF-4 | OF-3 | | OF-2 | | OF-1 |
| Finnish Air Force |
| Finnish Air Force | | Kenraali | Kenraaliluutnantti | Kenraalimajuri | Prikaatikenraali | Eversti | Everstiluutnantti | Majuri | | Kapteeni | | Yliluutnantti | Luutnantti | Vänrikki |
| Finnish Air Force | | General | Generallöjtnant | Generalmajor | Brigadgeneral | Överste | Överstelöjtnant | Major | | Kapten | | Premiärlöjtnant | Löjtnant | Fänrik |
| French Air and Space Force |
| French Air and Space Force | | Général d´armée aérienne | Général de corps aérien | Général de division aérienne | Général de brigade aérienne | Colonel | Lieutenant-colonel | Commandant | | Capitaine | | Lieutenant | | Sous-lieutenant |
| German Air Force |
| German Air Force | | General | Generalleutnant | Generalmajor | Brigadegeneral | Oberst | Oberstleutnant | Major | | Stabshauptmann | Hauptmann | Oberleutnant | | Leutnant |
| Hellenic Air Force |
| Hellenic Air Force | | Πτέραρχος; Pterarchos | Αντιπτέραρχος; Antipterarchos | Υποπτέραρχος; Ypopterarchos | Ταξίαρχος; Taxiarchos | Σμήναρχος; Sminarchos | Αντισμήναρχος; Antisminarchos | Επισμηναγός; Episminagos | | Σμηναγός; Sminagos | | Υποσμηναγός; Yposminagos | | Ανθυποσμηναγός; Anthyposminagos |
| Hungarian Air Force |
| Hungarian Air Force | | Vezérezredes | Altábornagy | Vezérőrnagy | Dandártábornok | Ezredes | Alezredes | Őrnagy | | Százados | | Főhadnagy | | Hadnagy |
| Iceland | No air force |
| Italian Air Force |
| Italian Air Force | | Generale | Generale di squadra aerea | Generale di divisione aerea | Generale di brigata aerea | Colonnello | Tenente colonnello | Maggiore | | Primo capitano | Capitano | Tenente | | Sottotenente |
| Latvian Air Force |
| Latvian Air Force | | | Ģenerālleitnants | Ģenerālmajors | Brigādes ģenerālis | Pulkvedis | Pulkvežleitnants | Majors | | Kapteinis | | Virsleitnants | | Leitnants |
| NATO code | OF-10 | OF-9 | OF-8 | OF-7 | OF-6 | OF-5 | OF-4 | OF-3 | | OF-2 | | OF-1 |
| Lithuanian Air Force |
| Lithuanian Air Force | | Generolas | Generolas leitenantas | Generolas majoras | Brigados generolas | Pulkininkas | Pulkininkas leitenantas | Majoras | | Kapitonas | | Vyresnysis leitenantas | | Leitenantas |
| Luxembourg | No air force |
| Montenegrin Air Force |
| Montenegrin Air Force | | General pukovnik | General potpukovnik | General major | Brigadir general | Pukovnik | Potpukovnik | Major | | Kapetan | | Poručnik | | Potporučnik |
| North Macedonia Air Force |
| North Macedonia Air Force | | Генерал; General | Генерал-потполковник; General-potpolkovnik | Генерал-мајор; General-major | Бригаден генерал Brigaden general | Полковник; Polkovnik | Потполковник; Potpolkovnik | Мајор; Major | | Капетан; Kapetan | | Поручник; Poručnik | | Потпоручник; Potporučnik |
| Royal Netherlands Air and Space Force |
| Royal Netherlands Air and Space Force | | Generaal | Luitenant-generaal | Generaal-majoor | Commodore | Kolonel | Luitenant-kolonel | Majoor | | Kapitein | | Eerste luitenant | | Tweede luitenant |
| Royal Norwegian Air Force |
| Royal Norwegian Air Force | | General | Generalløytnant | Generalmajor | Brigader | Oberst | Oberstløytnant | Major | | Kaptein | | Løytnant | | Fenrik |
| Polish Air Force |
| Polish Air Force | Marszałek Polski | Generał | Generał broni | Generał dywizji | Generał brygady | Pułkownik | Podpułkownik | Major | | Kapitan | | Porucznik | | Podporucznik |
| Portuguese Air Force |
| Portuguese Air Force | Marechal da Força Aérea | General | Tenente-general | Major-general | Brigadeiro-general | Coronel | Tenente-coronel | Major | | Capitão | | Tenente | | Alferes |
| NATO code | OF-10 | OF-9 | OF-8 | OF-7 | OF-6 | OF-5 | OF-4 | OF-3 | | OF-2 | | OF-1 |
| Romanian Air Force |
| Romanian Air Force | Mareșal | General | General-locotenent | General-maior | General de flotilă aeriană | Comandor | Căpitan-comandor | Locotenent-comandor | | Căpitan | | Locotenent | | Sublocotenent |
| (Slovakia) Slovak Air Force |
| (Slovakia) Slovak Air Force | | Generál | Generálporučík (Note: The appropriate branch of service badge is pinned just under the top button of the for all ranks excluding full General.) | Generálmajor | Brigádny generál | Plukovník | Podplukovník | Major | | Kapitán | | Nadporučík | | Poručík |
| Slovenian Air Force and Air Defence |
| Slovenian Air Force and Air Defence | | General polkovnik | Generalpodpolkovnik | Generalmajor | Brigadni general | Polkovnik | Podpolkovnik | Major | | Stotnik | | Nadporočnik | | Poročnik |
| Spanish Air and Space Force |
| Spanish Air and Space Force | Capitán general | General del Aire | Teniente general | General de división | General de brigada | Coronel | Teniente coronel | Comandante | | Capitán | | Teniente | | Alférez |
| Swedish Air Force |
| Swedish Air Force | | General | Generallöjtnant | Generalmajor | Brigadgeneral | Överste | Överstelöjtnant | Major | | Kapten | | Löjtnant | | Fänrik |
| Turkish Air Force |
| Turkish Air Force | Mareşal | Orgeneral | Korgeneral | Tümgeneral | Tuğgeneral | Albay | Yarbay | Binbaşı | | Yüzbaşı | | Üsteğmen | Teğmen | Asteğmen |
| Royal Air Force |
| Royal Air Force | Marshal of the RAF | Air chief marshal | Air marshal | Air vice-marshal | Air commodore | Group captain | Wing commander | Squadron leader | | Flight lieutenant | | Flying officer | | Pilot officer /acting pilot officer |
| United States Air Force |
| United States Air Force | General of the Air Force | General | Lieutenant general | Major general | Brigadier general | Colonel | Lieutenant colonel | Major | | Captain | | First lieutenant | | Second lieutenant |
| United States Space Force |
| United States Space Force | | General | Lieutenant general | Major general | Brigadier general | Colonel | Lieutenant colonel | Major | | Captain | | First lieutenant | | Second lieutenant |
| NATO code | OF-10 | OF-9 | OF-8 | OF-7 | OF-6 | OF-5 | OF-4 | OF-3 | | OF-2 | | OF-1 |

== See also ==
- NATO
- Ranks and insignia of NATO
- Ranks and insignia of NATO armies enlisted
- Ranks and insignia of NATO armies officers
- Ranks and insignia of NATO air forces enlisted
- Ranks and insignia of NATO navies enlisted
- Ranks and insignia of NATO navies officers
