= Ranks and insignia of NATO armies officers =

Commissioned officers' rank comparison chart of all land forces of NATO member states.

== Officers (OF 1–10) ==
NATO code	OF-10	OF-9	OF-8	OF-7	OF-6	OF-5		OF-4	OF-3		OF-2		OF-1		
Albanian Land Force															
Albanian Land Force			Gjeneral lejtant	Gjeneral major	Gjeneral brigade	Kolonel		Nënkolonel	Major		Kapiten		Toger		Nëntoger
Belgian Land Component															
Belgian Land Component		Generaal	Luitenant-generaal	Generaal-majoor	Brigadegeneraal	Kolonel		Luitenant-kolonel	Majoor	Kapitein-commandant	Kapitein		Luitenant		Onderluitenant
Belgian Land Component		Général	Lieutenant général	Général-major	Général de Brigade	Colonel		Lieutenant-colonel	Major	Capitaine-commandant	Capitaine		Lieutenant		Sous-lieutenant
Belgian Land Component		General	Generalleutnant	Generalmajor	Brigadegeneral	Oberst		Oberstleutnant	Major	Stabshauptmann	Hauptmann		Leutnant		Unterleutnant
Bulgarian Land Forces															
Bulgarian Land Forces		Генерал; General	Генерал-лейтенант; General-leytenant	Генерал-майор; General-mayor	Бригаден генерал Brigaden general	Полковник; Polkovnik		Подполковник; Podpolkovnik	Майор; Mayor		Капитан; Kapitan		Старши лейтенант Starshi leytenant		Лейтенант; Leytenant
Canadian Army															
Canadian Army		General	Lieutenant-general	Major-general	Brigadier-general	Colonel		Lieutenant-colonel	Major		Captain		Lieutenant		Second lieutenant
Canadian Army		Général(e)	Lieutenant(e)-général(e)	Major(e)-général(e)	Brigadier(ère)-général(e)	Colonel(le)		Lieutenant(e)-colonel(le)	Major(e)		Capitaine		Lieutenant(e)		Sous-lieutenant(e)
Croatian Army															
Croatian Army	Stožerni general	General zbora	General pukovnik	General bojnik	Brigadni general	Brigadir		Pukovnik	Bojnik		Satnik		Natporučnik		Poručnik
Czech Land Forces															
Czech Land Forces		Armádní generál	Generálporučík	Generálmajor	Brigádní generál	Plukovník		Podplukovník	Major		Kapitán		Nadporučík		Poručík
Royal Danish Army															
Royal Danish Army		General	Generalløjtnant	Generalmajor	Brigadegeneral	Oberst		Oberstløjtnant	Major		Kaptajn		Premierløjtnant	Løjtnant	Sekondløjtnant
Estonian Land Forces															
Estonian Land Forces		Kindral	Kindralleitnant	Kindralmajor	Brigaadikindral	Kolonel		Kolonelleitnant	Major		Kapten		Leitnant	Nooremleitnant	Lipnik
NATO code	OF-10	OF-9	OF-8	OF-7	OF-6	OF-5		OF-4	OF-3		OF-2		OF-1		
Finnish Army						Colonel		Lieutenant Colonel	Major		Captain			Lieutenant	Second Lieutenant
Finnish Army		Kenraali	Kenraaliluutnantti	Kenraalimajuri	Prikaatikenraali	Eversti		Everstiluutnantti	Majuri		Kapteeni		Yliluutnantti	Luutnantti	Vänrikki
Finnish Army		General	Generallöjtnant	Generalmajor	Brigadgeneral	Överste		Överstelöjtnant	Major		Kapten		Premiärlöjtnant	Löjtnant	Fänrik
French Army															
French Army	Maréchal de France	Général d'armée	Général de corps d'armée	Général de division	Général de brigade	Colonel		Lieutenant-colonel	Commandant		Capitaine		Lieutenant		Sous-lieutenant
German Army															
German Army		General	Generalleutnant	Generalmajor	Brigadegeneral	Oberst		Oberstleutnant	Major		Stabshauptmann	Hauptmann	Oberleutnant		Leutnant
Hellenic Army															
Hellenic Army		Στρατηγός; Stratigos	Αντιστράτηγος; Antistratigos	Υποστράτηγος; Ypostratigos	Ταξίαρχος; Taxiarchos	Συνταγματάρχης; Syntagmatarchis		Αντισυνταγματάρχης; Antisyntagmatarchis	Ταγματάρχης; Tagmatarchis		Λοχαγός; Lochagos		Υπολοχαγός; Ypolochagos		Ανθυπολοχαγός; Anthypolochagos
Hungarian Ground Forces															
Hungarian Ground Forces		Vezérezredes	Altábornagy	Vezérőrnagy	Dandártábornok	Ezredes		Alezredes	Őrnagy		Százados		Főhadnagy		Hadnagy
Iceland Crisis Response Unit															
Iceland Crisis Response Unit						Ofursti		Undirofursti	Majór		Höfuðsmaður		Liðsforingi		Undirliðsforingi
Italian Army															
Italian Army		Generale	Generale di Corpo d'Armata (Tenente Generale)	Generale di Divisione (Maggior Generale)	Generale di Brigata (Brigadier Generale)	Colonnello		Tenente Colonnello	Maggiore		Primo capitano	Capitano	Tenente		Sottotenente
Latvian Land Forces															
Latvian Land Forces			Ģenerālleitnants	Ģenerālmajors	Brigādes ģenerālis	Pulkvedis		Pulkvežleitnants	Majors		Kapteinis		Virsleitnants		Leitnants
NATO code	OF-10	OF-9	OF-8	OF-7	OF-6	OF-5		OF-4	OF-3		OF-2		OF-1		
Lithuanian Land Force															
Lithuanian Land Force		Generolas	Generolas leitenantas	Generolas majoras	Brigados generolas	Pulkininkas		Pulkininkas leitenantas	Majoras		Kapitonas		Vyresnysis leitenantas		Leitenantas
Luxembourg Army															
Luxembourg Army					Général	Colonel		Lieutenant-colonel	Major		Capitaine		Lieutenant en premier		Lieutenant
Montenegrin Ground Army															
Montenegrin Ground Army		General pukovnik	General potpukovnik	General major	Brigadir general	Pukovnik		Potpukovnik	Major		Kapetan		Poručnik		Potporučnik
North Macedonia Ground Forces															
North Macedonia Ground Forces		Генерал; General	Генерал-потполковник; General-potpolkovnik	Генерал-мајор; General-major	Бригаден генерал Brigaden general	Полковник; Polkovnik		Потполковник; Potpolkovnik	Мајор; Major		Капетан; Kapetan		Поручник; Poručnik		Потпоручник; Potporučnik
Royal Netherlands Army															
Royal Netherlands Army		Generaal	Luitenant-generaal	Generaal-majoor	Brigadegeneraal	Kolonel		Luitenant-kolonel	Majoor		Kapitein/ Ritmeester		Eerste luitenant		Tweede luitenant
Norwegian Army															
Norwegian Army		General	Generalløytnant	Generalmajor	Brigader	Oberst		Oberstløytnant	Major		Kaptein/ Rittmester		Løytnant		Fenrik
Polish Land Forces															
Polish Land Forces	Marszałek Polski	Generał	Generał broni	Generał dywizji	Generał brygady	Pułkownik		Podpułkownik	Major		Kapitan		Porucznik		Podporucznik
Portuguese Army															
Portuguese Army	Marechal do Exército	General	Tenente-general	Major-general	Brigadeiro-general	Coronel-tirocinado (Note: Colonel who has completed the General Officer training course. Between 1929 and 1937, the Coronel-tirocinado was called Brigadeiro.)	Coronel	Tenente-coronel	Major		Capitão		Tenente		Alferes
NATO code	OF-10	OF-9	OF-8	OF-7	OF-6	OF-5		OF-4	OF-3		OF-2		OF-1		
Romanian Land Forces															
Romanian Land Forces	Mareșal	General	General-locotenent	General-maior	General de brigadă	Colonel		Locotenent-colonel	Maior		Căpitan		Locotenent		Sublocotenent
Slovak Ground Forces															
Slovak Ground Forces		Generál	Generálporučík (Note: The appropriate branch of service badge is pinned just under the top button of the for all ranks excluding full General.)	Generálmajor	Brigádny generál	Plukovník		Podplukovník	Major		Kapitán		Nadporučík		Poručík
Slovenian Ground Force															
Slovenian Ground Force		General	Generalpodpolkovnik	Generalmajor	Brigadir	Polkovnik		Podpolkovnik	Major		Stotnik		Nadporočnik		Poročnik
Spanish Army	Capitán General	General de Ejército	Teniente General	General de División	General de Brigada	Coronel		Teniente Coronel	Comandante		Capitán		Teniente		Alférez
Spanish Army	Capitán general	General de ejército	Teniente general	General de división	General de brigada	Coronel		Teniente coronel	Comandante		Capitán		Teniente		Alférez
Swedish Army															
Swedish Army		General	Generallöjtnant	Generalmajor	Brigadgeneral	Överste		Överstelöjtnant	Major		Kapten		Löjtnant		Fänrik
Turkish Land Forces															
Turkish Land Forces	Mareşal	Orgeneral	Korgeneral	Tümgeneral	Tuğgeneral	Albay		Yarbay	Binbaşı		Yüzbaşı		Üsteğmen	Teğmen	Asteğmen
British Army	Field marshal	General	Lieutenant-general	Major-general	Brigadier	Colonel		Lieutenant-colonel	Major		Captain		Lieutenant		Second lieutenant
British Army	Field marshal	General	Lieutenant-general	Major-general	Brigadier	Colonel		Lieutenant colonel	Major		Captain		Lieutenant		Second lieutenant
United States Army	General of the Army	General	Lieutenant general	Major general	Brigadier general	Colonel		Lieutenant colonel	Major		Captain		First lieutenant		Second lieutenant
United States Army	General of the Army	General	Lieutenant general	Major general	Brigadier general	Colonel		Lieutenant colonel	Major		Captain		First lieutenant		Second lieutenant
NATO code	OF-10	OF-9	OF-8	OF-7	OF-6	OF-5		OF-4	OF-3		OF-2		OF-1		

== See also ==
- Ranks and insignia of NATO
- Ranks and insignia of NATO armies enlisted
- Ranks and insignia of NATO air forces enlisted
- Ranks and insignia of NATO air forces officers
- Ranks and insignia of NATO navies enlisted
- Ranks and insignia of NATO navies officers
