= Ruslan Kokshin =

Russian military officer (born 1979)

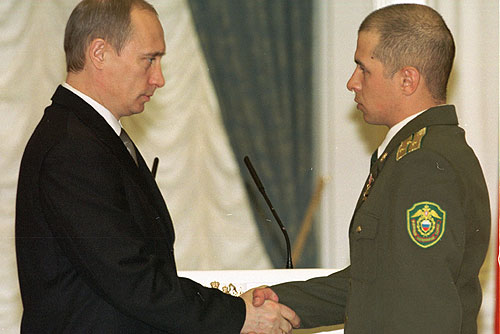

Ruslan Kokshin (born May 7, 1979) is an officer in the Russian military. While serving as a leader of a mortar platoon, Kokshin located and took out a small group of opposition forces in Chechnya. Due to this action by him, Kokshin was awarded the title Hero of the Russian Federation for his "heroic duty while in the service of the state."

== Biography ==
Ruslan Kokshin was born on 7 May 1979 in the city of Tula. He completed his secondary education there. In 1996, Kokshin enrolled in the Tula Artillery Engineering Institute. After graduating in 2001, he continued his military service in an airborne assault unit of the Russian Border Troops, stationed in the North Caucasus Border District. By July 2002, Senior Lieutenant Ruslan Kokshin was commanding a mortar platoon of the airborne assault maneuver group of the Itum-Kale (Argun) Border Detachment of the North Caucasus Regional Directorate of the Federal Border Service.

On 27 July 2002, Kokshin, at the head of a reconnaissance and search group (RSG), was air-dropped into the area of the “Groztkhoy” border outpost, through whose sector a large armed formation of about sixty fighters, subordinate to field commander Ruslan Gelayev, intended to break through from Georgian territory. During the pursuit, Kokshin’s group was ambushed and subjected to heavy fire. Kokshin managed to withdraw his group from enemy fire. Waiting until nightfall, he deployed observers and organized all-round defense. At dawn on 28 July, the militants attempted to attack the border guards’ positions. In the battle, Kokshin skillfully directed the actions of his subordinates and, with fire from an under-barrel grenade launcher and his assault rifle, destroyed three enemy firing points. When there was a real threat of capture, Kokshin called mortar fire on his own position by radio. A relief group led by Lieutenant Anatoly Korobenkov forced the enemy back and broke through the encirclement of Kokshin’s group. The remnants of the armed formation were forced to retreat to Georgia. In total, eight border guards and at least 24 militants were killed in the fighting.

By Decree of the President of the Russian Federation No. 1389dsp of 9 December 2002, for “courage and heroism demonstrated in the performance of military duty in the North Caucasus region,” Senior Lieutenant Ruslan Kokshin was awarded the high title of Hero of the Russian Federation, with the presentation of the Gold Star medal No. 771.
