= Gulmast Khan =

Oldest RIAF officer (1882-1947)

Haji Gulmast Khan
- ګلمست خان

Personal details
- Born: 1 May 1882
- Died: 1947 (aged 64–65)

Military service
- Branch/service: British Indian Army (1898-1900); Royal Indian Air Force (1941-1947)
- Years of service: 1941-1947
- Rank: Flight Lieutenant
- Awards: See list

Gulmast Khan (Note: Pashto: ګلمست خان) (1 May 1882 — 1947) was an officer in the British Indian Army, a police officer, and an officer in the Royal Indian Air Force (RIAF). He holds the distinction of being the oldest person commissioned into the RIAF at the age of 59.

== Early life ==
Gulmast Khan was born on 1 May 1882 into a Pashtun family belonging to the Zakha Khel clan of the Afridi tribe.

== Service years ==
=== British Indian Army ===
He served in the British Indian Army from 1898 to 1900 and was awarded the East and Central Africa Medal for participating in the military campaign.

=== Police service (1900-1940) ===
Gulmast Khan joined the Police Department of the North-West Frontier Province on 18 December 1900.

He held non-gazetted appointments from 18 December 1900 to 10 January 1928 and was serving as an Inspector of Police. On 11 January 1928 while stationed at Mardan, he was appointed to officiate as Deputy Superintendent of Police (Dy. S.P.). He subsequently served in Peshawar on 7 May 1928 and Tank on 8 June 1928, continuing in his substantive position as Inspector while officiating as Deputy Superintendent.

On 1 March 1929, the record notes that he reverted to his substantive appointment as Inspector, indicating the temporary conclusion of his officiating role. However on 7 March, while again stationed at Tank, he was reappointed to officiate as Deputy Superintendent of Police. He was later posted to Dera Ismail Khan on 1 August 1929, where he continued serving in that officiating capacity.

=== Royal Indian Air Force (1941-1947) ===
Gulmast Khan was commissioned into the Administrative and Special Duties (A&SD) branch of the Royal Indian Air Force on 10 October 1941.

== Death ==
Gulmast Khan died sometime in 1947.

== Awards and Decorations ==
- East and Central Africa Medal, 1899
- Edward, Prince Of Wales, visit to India Medal, 1905-1906
- India General Service Medal (1909-1935)
- Delhi Durbar Medal (1911)
- Khan Sahib, 1st January 1921
- Sanad, Viceroy and Governor-General of India, Earl of Willingdon, 1924
- Given the title of Khan Bahadur by the Viceroy and Governor-General of India, Earl of Willingdon, 1932
- King George V Silver Jubilee Medal, 1935
- King's Police Medal (for gallantry), 1936
