= Flight lieutenant =

Junior commissioned rank

Flight lieutenant (Flt Lt or F/L) is a junior officer rank used by some air forces, with origins from the Royal Air Force. The rank originated in the Royal Naval Air Service (RNAS) in 1914. It fell into abeyance when the RNAS merged with the Royal Flying Corps during the First World War but was revived in 1919 in the post-war RAF. The rank is used by air forces of many countries that have historical British influence.

Flight lieutenant is immediately senior to flying officer and immediately below squadron leader. It is usually equivalent to the rank of lieutenant in the navy and of the rank of captain in other services.

The equivalent rank in the former Women's Auxiliary Air Force (WAAF), Women's Royal Air Force (WRAF) and Princess Mary's Royal Air Force Nursing Service (PMRAFNS) (until 1980) was flight officer.

== Canada ==
The rank was used in the Royal Canadian Air Force from 1920 until the 1968 unification of the Canadian Forces, when army-type rank titles were adopted. Canadian flight lieutenants then became captains. In official Canadian French usage, the rank title was capitaine d'aviation.

== Denmark ==
Following the creation of the Royal Danish Air Force, the ranks of flight lieutenant first and second class (Danish: Flyverløjtnant 1. grad and Flyverløjtnant 2. grad) were used. The ranks were used until 1970, when they were replaced by first and second lieutenant (Danish: Premierløjtnant and Sekondløjtnant).

== United Kingdom ==
Flight lieutenant
- Shoulder and sleeve insignia
- Country: United Kingdom
- Service branch: Royal Air Force
- Abbreviation: Flt Lt / FLTLT
- Rank group: Junior officers
- NATO rank code: OF-2
- Formation: August 1919
- Next higher rank: Squadron leader
- Next lower rank: Flying officer
- Equivalent ranks: Lieutenant (RN); Captain (British Army; RM)

Related articles
- History: Royal Naval Air Service

=== Origins ===
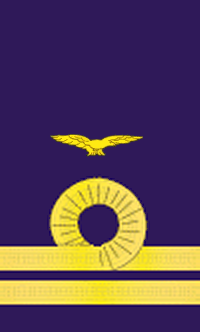
The rank insignia of a Royal Naval Air Service flight lieutenant

The rank originated in the Royal Navy as a rank title for naval lieutenants serving in the Royal Naval Air Service (RNAS). Promotions to the rank were first gazetted on 30 June 1914. It fell into abeyance when the RNAS merged with the Royal Flying Corps during the First World War but was revived in 1919 in the post-war RAF.

On 1 April 1918, the newly created RAF adopted its officer rank titles from the British Army, with Royal Naval Air Service lieutenants (titled as flight lieutenants and flight commanders) and Royal Flying Corps captains becoming captains in the RAF. In response to the proposal that the RAF should use its own rank titles, it was suggested that the RAF might use the Royal Navy's officer ranks, with the word "air" inserted before the naval rank title. For example, the current rank of flight lieutenant would have been "air lieutenant". Although the Admiralty objected to this simple modification of their rank titles, it was agreed that the RAF might base many of its officer rank titles on navy officer ranks with differing pre-modifying terms. It was also suggested that RAF captains might be entitled flight-leaders. However, the rank title flight lieutenant was chosen as flights were typically commanded by RAF captains and the term flight lieutenant had been used in the Royal Naval Air Service. The RAF rank of flight lieutenant was introduced in August 1919 and it has been used continuously since then.

=== Usage in the RAF ===
Although in the early years of the RAF a flight lieutenant commanded an aircraft flight, with the increasing combat power of aircraft and therefore squadrons, command and control has shifted up the rank structure (currently, for instance, most squadron commanders in the RAF are Wing Commanders, a reflection on the comparative combat power between the modern air force and its predecessor).

The RAF's promotion system is automatic up until flight lieutenant. Every officer will attain the rank provided they complete their professional training and do not leave early. For aircrew, flight lieutenant is reached 2.5 years after commissioning, Engineering Branch (AS & CE) entrants with applicable bachelor's/master's degrees reach flight lieutenant at 2.5 and 1.5 years respectively, and for all other ground branch officers, 3.5 years. Aircrew are appointed to an Early Departure Payment Commission upon reaching their Operational Conversion Unit, which is a commission for 20 years or age 40, whichever is later. Promotion to squadron leader thereafter is strictly upon merit; officers promoted beyond flight lieutenant are appointed to a career commission, or service to age 60. Resigning a commission is generally dependent on the needs of the service, although an officer who has completed their return of service (service the RAF requires to justify its expense in originally training the officer) could leave after as little as four years. For aircrew, given the large expense required for training, this return of service is generally the length of their initial commission anyway, unless they re-role to a different branch having failed an element of flying training. Most aircrew reach their squadrons as flight lieutenants due to the length of training time required (up to four years for fast jet pilots) and the significant holds in the training pipeline. The majority of squadron line pilots are flight lieutenants, with some squadron executives or Career Commission aircrew reaching Squadron Leader.

Aside from aircrew, whose work typically does not require active leadership for units of airmen, ground branch officers can expect to operate units that can range in size from a few specialist non-commissioned personnel to 50 or more personnel for engineering or other manpower intensive roles. The role of a flight lieutenant generally involves management of a team of specialist non-commissioned officers and airmen, within their specific branch. In the RAF Regiment, a flight lieutenant generally has the same role and responsibility as a captain in the British Army, in charge of a regiment flight of 30 men, and could be second-in-command of a squadron of up to 120 men.

Flight lieutenant is the most common officer rank in the RAF; in April 2013, for example, there were 8,230 RAF officers, of whom 3,890 (47.3%) were flight lieutenants. In RAF informal usage, a flight lieutenant is sometimes referred to as a "flight lieuy". A Flight Lieutenant's starting salary is £42,008.48 as of 2019.

=== RAF Air Cadets ===
In the Air Training Corps, a flight lieutenant is usually the officer commanding of a squadron, appointed under a Cadet Forces Commission. Retired flight lieutenants are the first rank that may continue to use their rank after they have left active service.

=== Insignia ===
The rank insignia consists of two narrow blue bands on slightly wider black bands. This is worn on both the lower sleeves of the tunic or on the shoulders of the flight suit or the casual uniform. The rank insignia on the mess uniform is similar to the naval pattern, being two band of gold running around each cuff but without the Royal Navy's loop. Unlike senior RAF officers, flight lieutenants are not entitled to fly a command flag under any circumstances.

An RAF flight lieutenant's sleeve/shoulder insignia

An RAF flight lieutenant's sleeve mess insignia

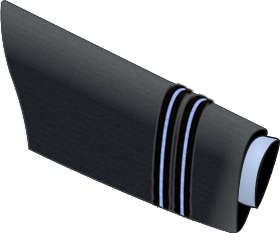
An RAF flight lieutenant's sleeve on No. 1 service dress uniform

== Gallery ==
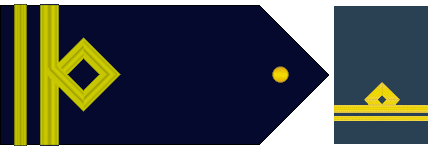
Lieutenant
(Argentine Air Force)

(Royal Australian Air Force)

(Bangladesh Air Force)

(Ghana Air Force)

(Indian Air Force)

(Namibian Air Force)

(Nigerian Air Force)

(Pakistan Air Force)

(Sri Lanka Air Force)

(Royal Air Force)

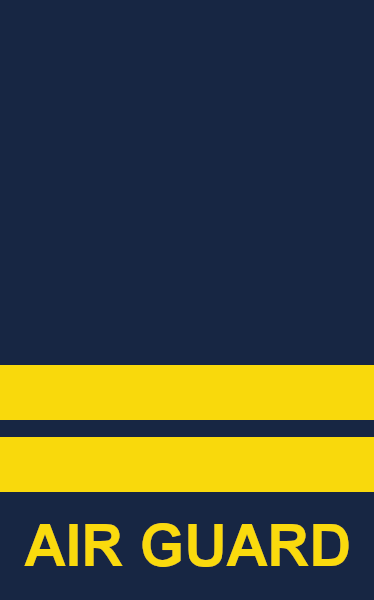
(Trinidad and Tobago Air Guard)

(Air Force of Zimbabwe)

== Notable flight lieutenants ==
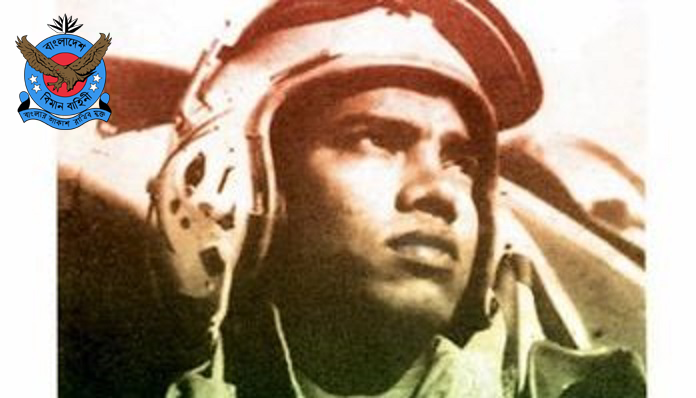
Bir Sreshtho Matiur Rahman, Bangladeshi freedom fighter and recipient of the highest military award in Bangladesh.

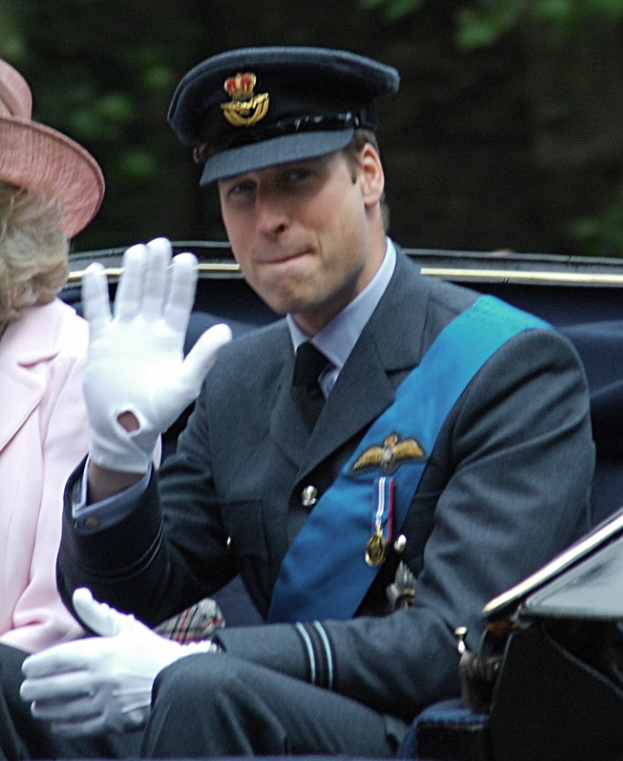
Prince William in 2010, in his flight lieutenant's uniform; promoted to squadron leader in 2016

- Gulmast Khan – holds the distinction of being the oldest person commissioned into the Royal Indian Air Force at the age of 59.
- Billy Strachan – pioneer of black civil rights in Britain, survived 33 missions during WWII when average life expectancy was 7 missions
- Alexander, Prince of Yugoslavia – member of Yugoslavian royal family
- Gerald Bouey – former governor of the Bank of Canada
- Sir Arthur C. Clarke – British author and inventor
- Sir Christopher Lee – British actor, served in RAF Intelligence during World War II
- Peter Francis Middleton – grandfather of Catherine, Princess of Wales and co-pilot of Prince Philip
- Sir Patrick Moore – British astronomer
- Donald Pleasence – British actor
- Matiur Rahman – Pakistan Air Force pilot who supported the Bangladesh War of Independence
- Jerry Rawlings – Ghanaian politician who twice served as his country's president
- Ian Smith – Prime Minister of Rhodesia (1964–1979)
- Rory Underwood – Leicester, England and British and Irish Lions winger
- Jim Vipond – Canadian sports columnist
- Gough Whitlam – Prime Minister of Australia (1972–1975)
- John Nichol – Former RAF Navigator, Gulf War prisoner of war and motivational speaker
- Sir Nicholas George Winton – contributed to the Kindertransport humanitarian rescue
- William, Prince of Wales

== See also ==
- Air force officer rank insignia
- British and U.S. military ranks compared
- Comparative military ranks
- RAF officer ranks
- Ranks of the RAAF
- Lieutenant (for pronunciation)
