= Prikaatikenraali =

Officer's rank in Finland

- Country: Finland
- NATO rank code: OF-6
- Next higher rank: Kenraalimajuri
- Next lower rank: Eversti

Prikaatikenraali (Brigadier General) is an officer's rank in Finland, immediately above eversti (Colonel) and below kenraalimajuri (Major General). In Finland, the rank is translated as brigadier general. Finnish Defence Forces rank of Prikaatinkenraali is comparable to Ranks of NATO armies officers as OF-6. A prikaatikenraali can serve as a commander of a brigade or in senior administrative, staff or planning tasks.

== History ==
The need for a new rank between kenraalimajuri and eversti came among international missions. Elsewhere in the world some of the duties were assigned to a general officer. Kenraalimajuri would have been too high-ranking for such missions, so in 1994 a rank of prikaatinkenraali was created specifically for high-ranking officers serving abroad. Prikaatinkenraali used to have a one silver lion as an insignia of rank, but in October 1995 the rank's name was changed to prikaatikenraali, the lion was changed to golden and other generals were given one additional lion. Therefore kenraalimajuri has now two lions instead of the previous one.

== See also ==
- Finnish military ranks
