= Kapitan (rank) =

Military rank

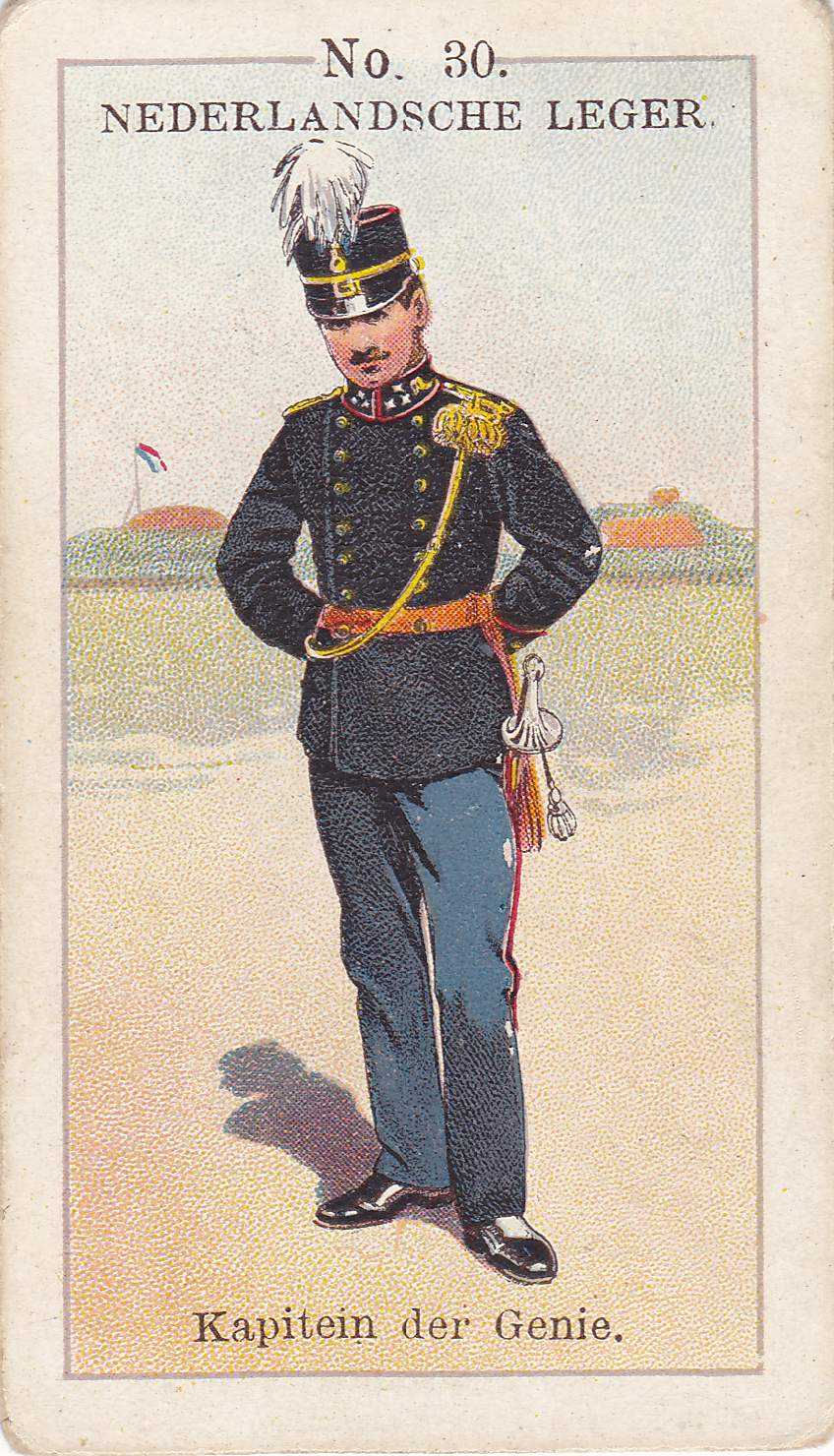
Kapitein, mil. engineering, Netherlands ca. 1900.

A kapitan (derived from French: capitaine; before Latin: capitaneus, lit. '(military) leader, count, or chairman of a parish council'; or Latin: caput, lit. 'head, main, chief, primary, principal, general, central, leading', etc.) is used manifold as rank, grade, or rank designation in the Army, Air Force or Navy of numerous countries and armed forces. In member countries of NATO-alliance Kapitan is a commissioned officer rank, rated OF-2 in line to the NATO officers rank system. The almost equivalent OF-2 officer, e.g. in the US Army, is the Captain rank.

== Historical roots ==
Kapitan (appointment, later rank) was used first in the middle age in France in order to designate leaders of the military districts or regions. In the second half of the 16th century, it came in use to specify commanding officers of company-sized units. In the 19th century it became gradually a military rank, and was used in combination with other noun, e.g. Stabs-kapitan (ru: штабс-капитан Russian Imperial Army) Kapitan-leytenant (naval forces). The rank designation Kapitan contains a common syllable and historical roots in a number of European countries at the one hand. Slight national variations of spelling are for the sake of the historical and heraldic tradition, at the other hand.

== Russia ==
Kapitan Kапита́н
- Army and air force insignia
- Country: Russia
- Service branch: Russian Ground Forces; Russian Air Force
- Non-NATO rank: OF-2
- Formation: 16th century
- Next higher rank: Majór
- Next lower rank: Stárshiy leytenánt
- Equivalent ranks: Kapitan-leytenant

In Russia, the military rank Kapitan was introduced in the 16th century to foreign officers, appointed to commander of company-sized units. In the 17th – 18th century this rank became open to all company commanders, serving in the regular army. In the cavalierly (in dragoon regiments and Special Corps of Gendarmes) the equivalent to Kapitan was Rotmister (derived from the German Rittmeister), and in the Cossacks corps it was Yesaul.

In the Russian Army (1855–1917) and in the so-called White Army braid shoulder boards with one central stripe have been worn (see picture 1, below). As the Major-rank was abolished in May 1884, the Kapitan-rank was upgraded to level VIII in the rank table. However, the Guards kapitan became equivalent to generic Podpolkovnik in the Army.

In the civil administration Kapitan of the infantry was equivalent to the Council assessor (ru: коллежский асессор; kollezhsky asessor) from 1884, and Titular adviser (ru: титулярный советник, tituljarny sovetnik) until 1884.

Sequence of ranks RIA 1917
lower rank: Shtabs-kapitan (en: Staff captain)	Kapitan (en: Captain)	higher rank: Major (en: Major)

Some examples of rank insignia (epaulette, shoulder board), used by RIA IRA, are shown below:

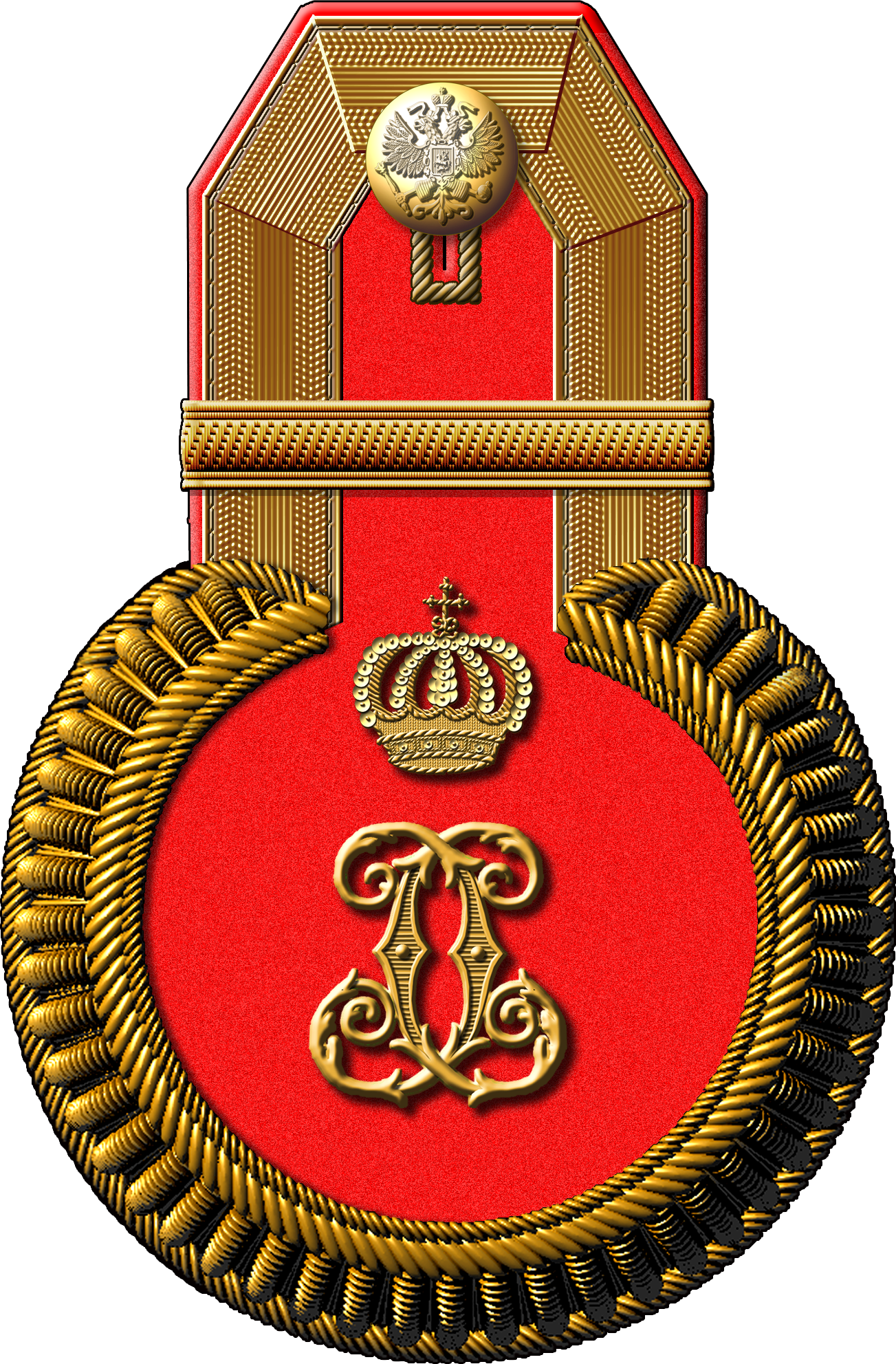
Kapitan epaulette (1904)

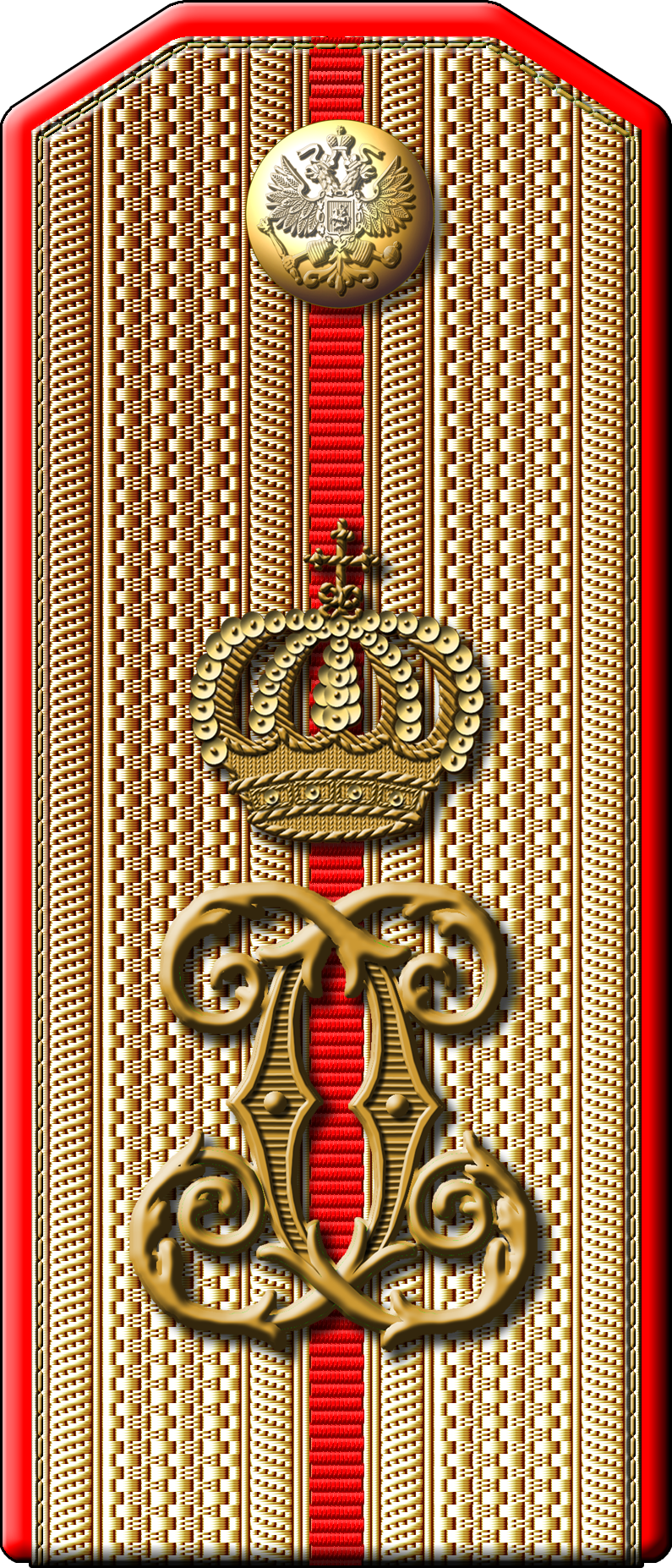
... shoulder board

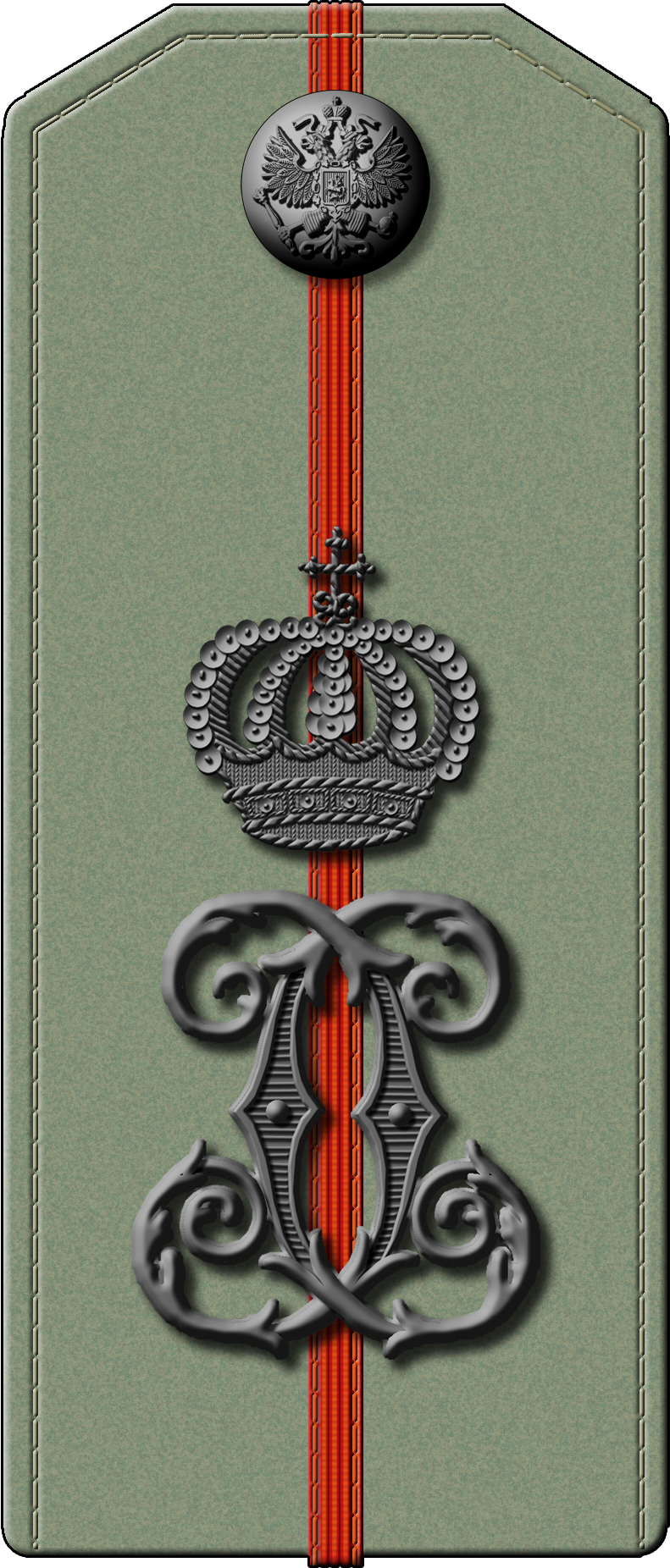
... field uniform

=== Soviet Union and Russian Federation ===
In the armed forces of the Soviet Union (later Russian Federation) the Kapitan´s rank (to Army, Air Force, and Navy land services) was introduced by disposal of the Central Executive Committee of the Soviet Union and the Council of People's Commissars, from September 22, 1935. It was equivalent to the rank kapitan-leytenant (ru: капитан-лейтенант) of the Navy.

If military personnel serves in a guards formation, or on a guards war ship, to the rank designation will be placed in front the noun guards (e.g. "Gurds kapitan"). Civil – or military personnel with a specific defined level of expertise or knowledge in medical or judicial professions, to the military rank will be added the noun "legal or the wording "medical service". Further adding to the military rank designation might be "retired" or "on retirement".

Personnel serving in the executive of the Russian Federation might be specified by rank designation as follows.

- Kapitan of the Police (until March 1, 2011 Kapitan of the Militsiya)
- Kapitan of the Internal Troops
- Kapitan investigation of tax offence

Sequence of ranks ascending
lower rank: Starshy leytenant (en: 1st lieutenant)	Kapitan (en: Captain)	higher rank: Major (en: Major)

=== Rank insignia ===
Some examples of rank insignia (shoulder, collar, and sleeve), used by Russia and the USSR, are shown below:

Gorget patch Kapitan RA USSR Land forces (1935—1943)

... Air Force (1935—1943)

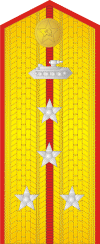
Shoulder board Land forces (1943—1955 гг.), corps colour «red», armoured troops.

parade uniform, Land forces (1955-1994), and since 2010

... ABF, AF, Aviation of the ADF (1955-1994), and since 2010

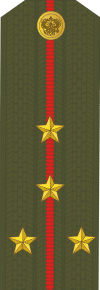
everyday uniform, Ground forces until 2010

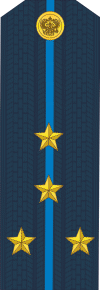
... uniform, AF until 2010

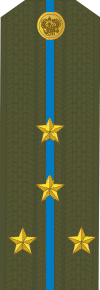
... uniform, ABF until 2010

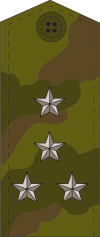
field uniform until 2010

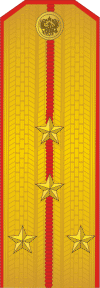
parade uniform shirt, Ground forces until 2010

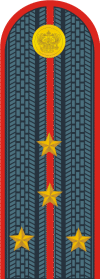
Kapitan of the Police (until 2011 — Militsiya), also Internal Troops

== Kapitan's insignia ==
=== Army ranks ===
Kapiten
(Albanian Army)

Капітан
Kapitan
(Belarusian Ground Forces)

Kapetan
(Bosnian Ground Forces)

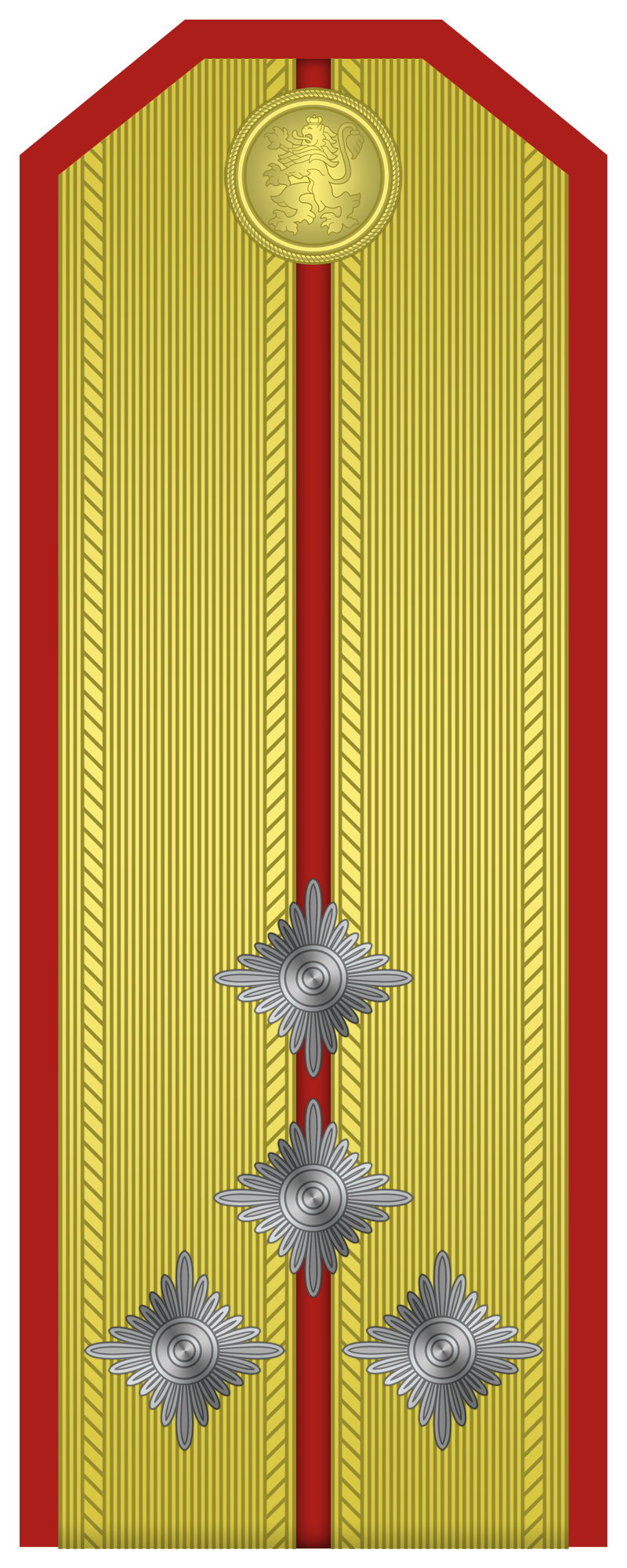
Капитан
Kapitan
(Bulgarian Land Forces)

Kapitán
(Czech Land Forces)

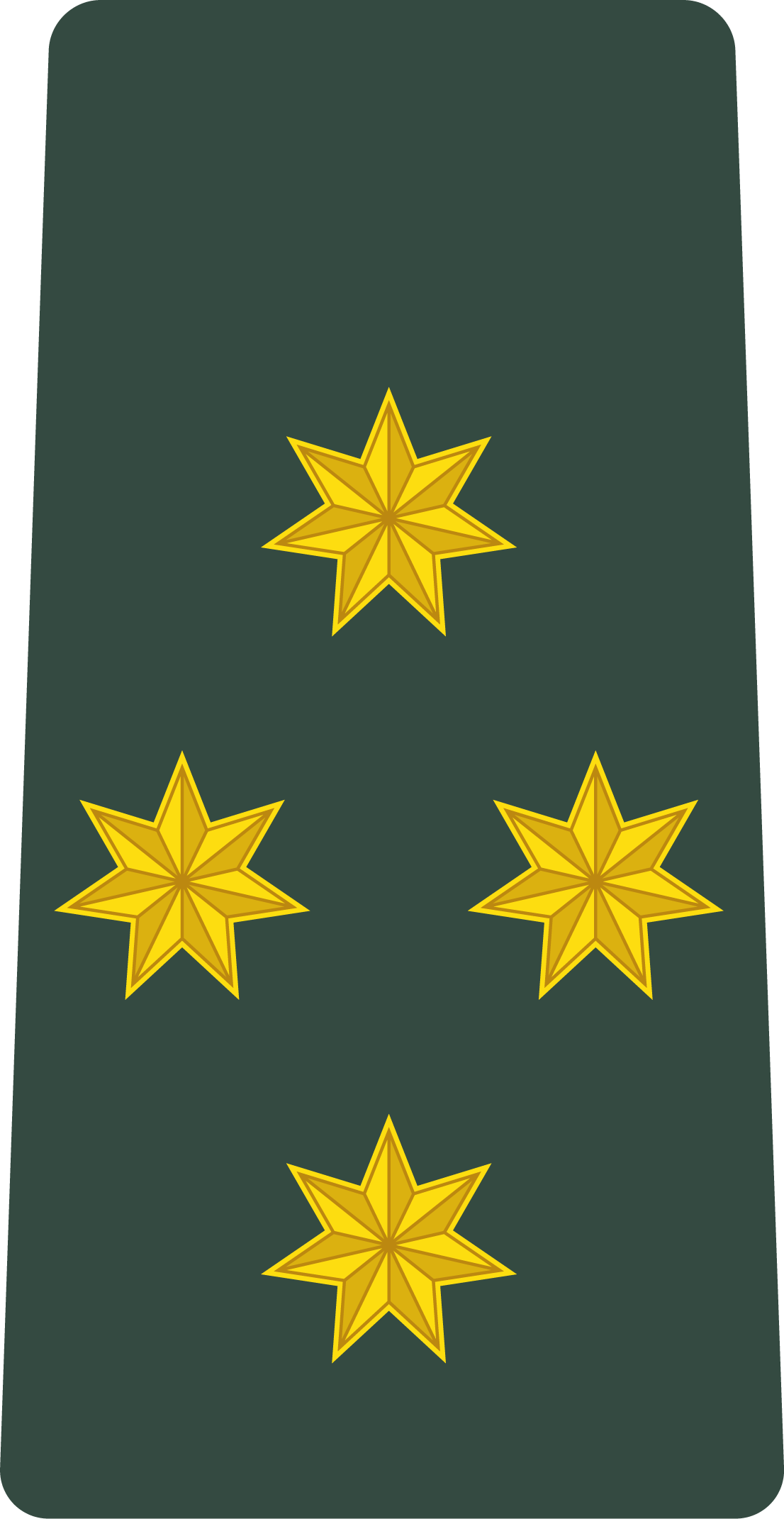
კაპიტანი
K'ap'it'ani
(Georgian Land Forces)

Kapiten
(Kosovo Security Force)

Kapitonas
(Lithuanian Land Forces)

Капетан
Kapetan
(North Macedonian Ground Forces)

Căpitan
(Moldovan Ground Forces)

Kapetan
(Montenegrin Ground Army)

Kapitan
(Polish Land Forces)

Căpitan
(Romanian Land Forces)

Kапита́н
Kapitán
(Russian Ground Forces)

Капетан
Kapetan
(Serbian Army)

Kapitán
(Slovak Ground Forces)

Капітан
Kapitan
(Ukrainian Ground Forces)

== See also ==
- Hauptmann
