= Eversti =

Military rank in the Finnish Defence Forces

- Country: Finland
- NATO rank code: OF-5
- Next higher rank: Prikaatikenraali
- Next lower rank: Everstiluutnantti

Eversti (Colonel) is an officer's rank in Finland, immediately above Everstiluutnantti (Lieutenant Colonel) and below Prikaatikenraali (Brigadier General). It literally means "the highest" and has originally been a rank for regiment commanders. In Finland, brigades are also commanded by holders of this rank. It is the highest rank below general officers.

Finnish Defense Forces rank of Eversti is comparable to OF-5 NATO rank.

== History ==
Colonels (eversti) have usually fulfilled roles similar to Brigadier General in other armies. Indeed, the rank of Brigadier General (prikaatikenraali) has been introduced relatively recently, enabling better compatibility of ranks in peacekeeping operations. In most large military installations such as training brigades, the commander is a Colonel, and several officers of the General Staff, such as inspectors of services, are also Colonels. Promotion to colonel requires graduation from a general staff officer course (80 study credits).

== See also ==
- Finnish military ranks
