= Everstiluutnantti =

- Country: Finland
- Next higher rank: Eversti
- Next lower rank: Majuri

Everstiluutnantti (Lieutenant colonel, Swedish: Överstelöjtnant) is an officer's rank in Finland, immediately above Majuri (Major) and below Eversti (Colonel).

== History ==
During peacetime, an everstiluutnantti is the commander of a battalion or a chief of staff for a regiment or brigade. The rank requires completion of a staff officer course. Only a few reservists have obtained the rank of everstiluutnantti. It requires active participation in national defence and a demanding wartime position.

== See also ==
- Finnish military ranks
