= Majuri =

- Finnish Army
- Country: Finland
- NATO rank code: OF3
- Next higher rank: Everstiluutnantti
- Next lower rank: Kapteeni

Majuri (Major) is a military officer's rank (OF3) in Finland, senior to Kapteeni and junior to Everstiluutnantti.

== History ==
During peacetime, a Majuri is a staff officer or battalion commander. The rank requires the completion of a senior staff officer course. It is also possible for reservists to obtain the reserve rank of Majuri. This is however, quite rare and requires active participation in national defence.

== See also ==
- Finnish military ranks
