= Kapteeni =

- Country: Finland
- Next higher rank: Majuri
- Next lower rank: Yliluutnantti

Kapteeni (Captain) is an officer's rank in Finland, immediately above yliluutnantti (lieutenant) and below majuri (major).

In peacetime training, a kapteeni is the commander of a company. (Majors can also be in this role, but usually majors work in command staff rather than in individual companies.) The rank requires additional training to obtain, in addition to the preexisting military university degree.

It is also possible for reservists to obtain the reserve rank of kapteeni.

== See also ==
- Finnish military ranks
