= Senior lieutenant =

Military rank

Senior lieutenant is a military grade between a lieutenant and a captain, often used by countries from the former Eastern Bloc and in the Nordic countries. It is comparable to first lieutenant.

== Finland ==
Yliluutnantti (Swedish: premiärlöjtnant) is a Finnish military rank above luutnantti (Swedish: löjtnant) and below kapteeni (Swedish: kapten). It is used in the Finnish Defence Forces (army, navy and air force) and the Finnish Border Guard.

The prescribed duty is a company second in command/executive officer. Officers who have graduated as Bachelors of Military Science from the National Defence College with the rank of luutnantti usually re-enter the college after four years' tour of duty[fi]. After a study of two additional years, they are promoted yliluutnantti and return to more challenging duties. Yliluutnantti is also the highest rank available to those educated in the now-decommissioned school Maanpuolustusopisto (comparable to a military junior college).

=== History and related ranks ===
The Army of the Finnish Grand Duchy of the Russian Empire had a rank of alikapteeni, similar in use as Prussian and Russian Stabskapitän. The rank of yliluutnantti came to Finland from Germany with Finnish Jäger troops in 1918, but Carl Gustaf Emil Mannerheim considered it too German and encouraged holders of the rank to use more the general rank of lieutenant instead. In some regiments officers with rank of yliluutnantti were considered to have been promoted to captain, and the rank fell in disuse until 1952 when it was taken into regular use, and ever since it has been in use in all three branches; air force, navy and the army.

Prior to the Second World War, graduates of the Defence College served with the rank of luutnantti. The rank of yliluutnantti was established in 1952, when it was felt that cadets graduating from the Defence College would be denied promotion avenues due to the large number of field-promoted company-grade officers in active service. As most of such officers held the rank of vänrikki or luutnantti, and were unlikely to advance to field grade (due to their background as NCOs and lack of academic studies), the rank of yliluutnantti circumvented the seniority issue. Due to this revision, reservists who held the wartime rank of luutnantti did not receive a promotion to captain, as would have been expected, but rather to yliluutnantti; promotions were not grandfathered.

== Germany, Austria & Switzerland ==
Within German language countries (Austria, Germany and Switzerland), the rank of Oberleutnant (transl. senior lieutenant) is used.

== Russia ==
Army, navy and air force insignia (Russian Federation)

Senior lieutenant (Russian: старший лейтенант, romanized: starshy leytenant) is used in the army, air force or navy of Russia and the former USSR.

=== Russian Empire and Soviet Union ===
In the Russian Empire senior lieutenant first appeared in the Table of Ranks (1909–1911) exclusively as naval rank IX class, and from 1912 as VIII class. Corresponding ranks were captain in the infantry, rotmister (derived from the German Rittmeister) in the cavalry, and yesaul in the Cossacks corps. In the civil administration it was almost equivalent to the "council assessor" (Russian коллежский асессор; kollezhsky assessor).

As result of the October Revolution this rank was abolished along with all other Russian ranks and rank insignia. It was reintroduced to the armed forces of the Soviet Union by disposal of the Central Executive Committee of the Soviet Union and the Council of People's Commissars in 1935. A senior lieutenant was junior to a captain or captain-lieutenant and senior to a lieutenant.

=== Russian Federation ===
The Russian Federation inherited the rank structure of the armed forces of the Soviet Union.

If military personnel serve in a guards formation, or on a guards warship, the word "guards" is placed before the rank (e.g. "guards senior lieutenant"). For civilian or military personnel with a specific level of expertise or knowledge in the medical or judicial professions, the words "medical" or "legal" are placed before the rank (e.g. "legal senior lieutenant"). The word "retired" is added after the rank for retired officers. Police, internal troops and tax office personnel have their branch added after the rank (e.g. "senior lieutenant of police")

== Senior lieutenant's insignia ==
ավագ լեյտենանտ
Avag leytenant
(Armenian Ground Forces)

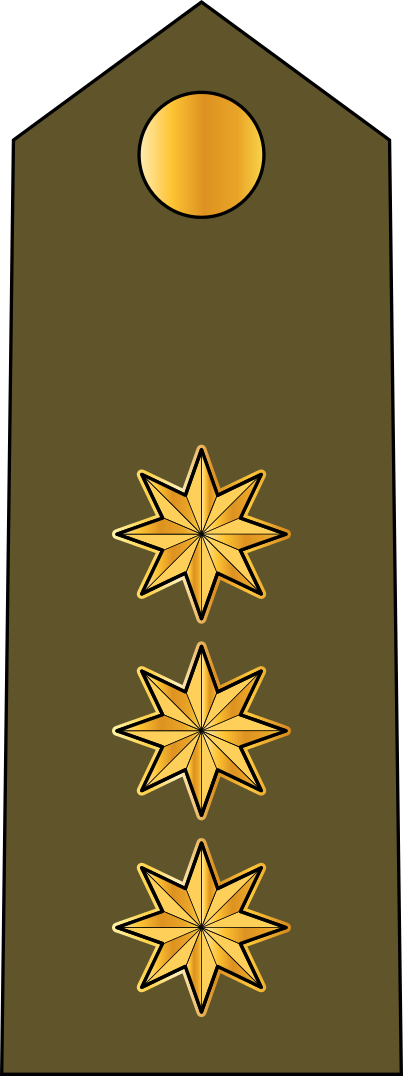
Baş leytenant
(Azerbaijani Land Forces)

Старшы лейтэнант
Staršy liejtenant
(Belarusian Ground Forces)

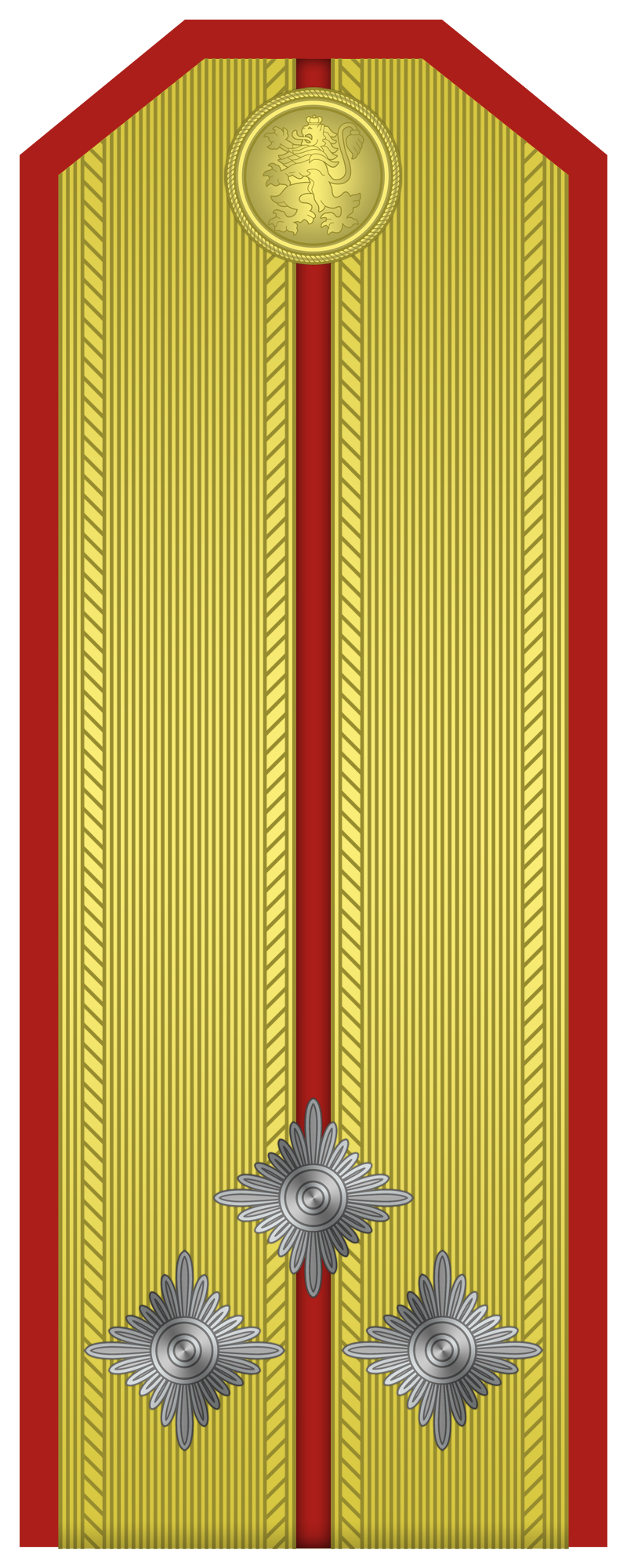
Старши лейтенант
Starshi leytenant
(Bulgarian Land Forces)

Natporučnik
(Croatian Army)

Nadporučík
(Czech Land Forces)

Yliluutnantti
Premiärlöjtnant
(Finnish Army)

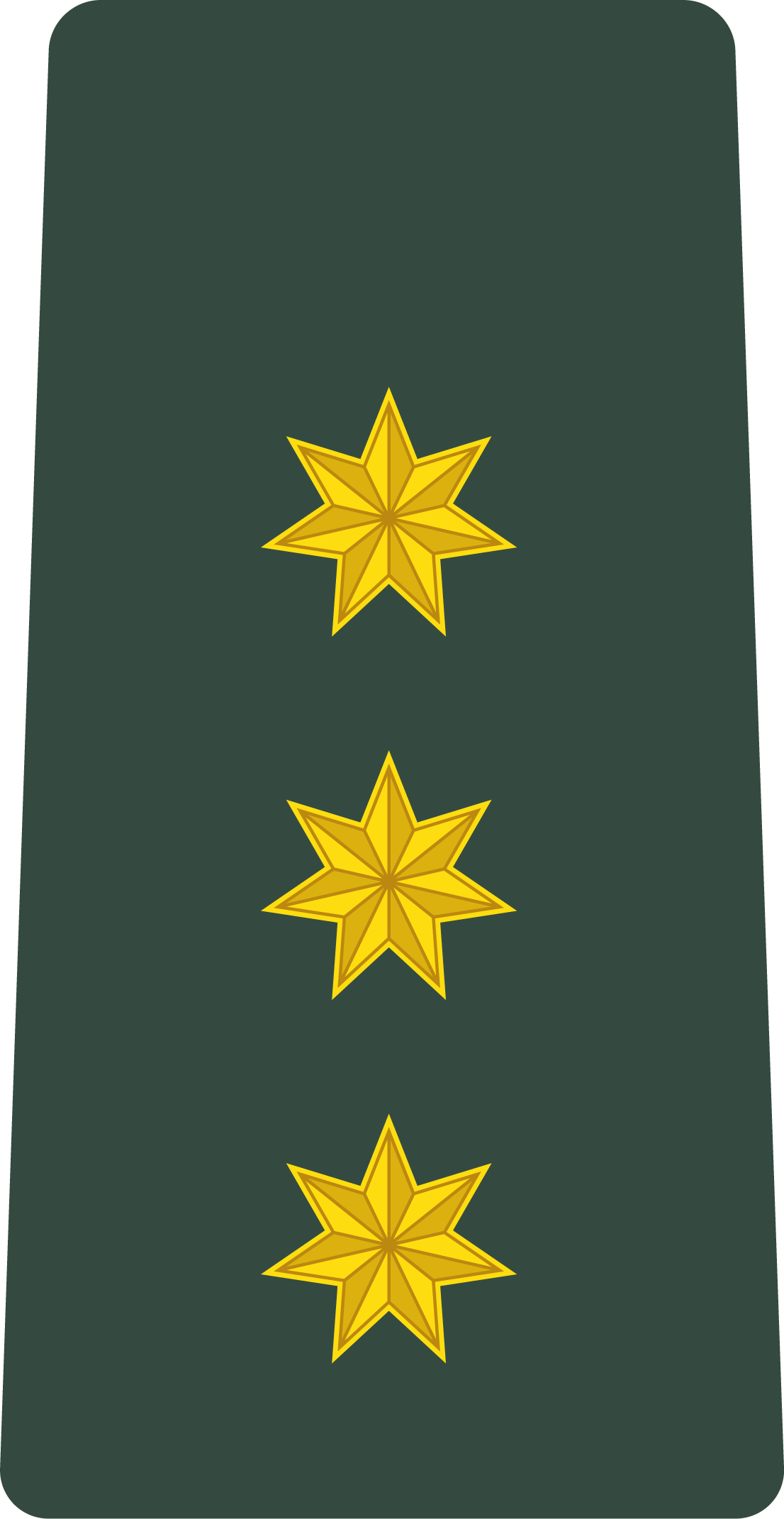
უფროსი ლეიტენანტი
Uprosi leit’enant’i
(Georgian Land Forces)

Főhadnagy
(Hungarian Ground Forces)

Аға лейтенант
Ağa leytenant
(Kazakh Ground Forces)

Улук лейтенант
Uluk leytenant
(Kyrgyz Army)

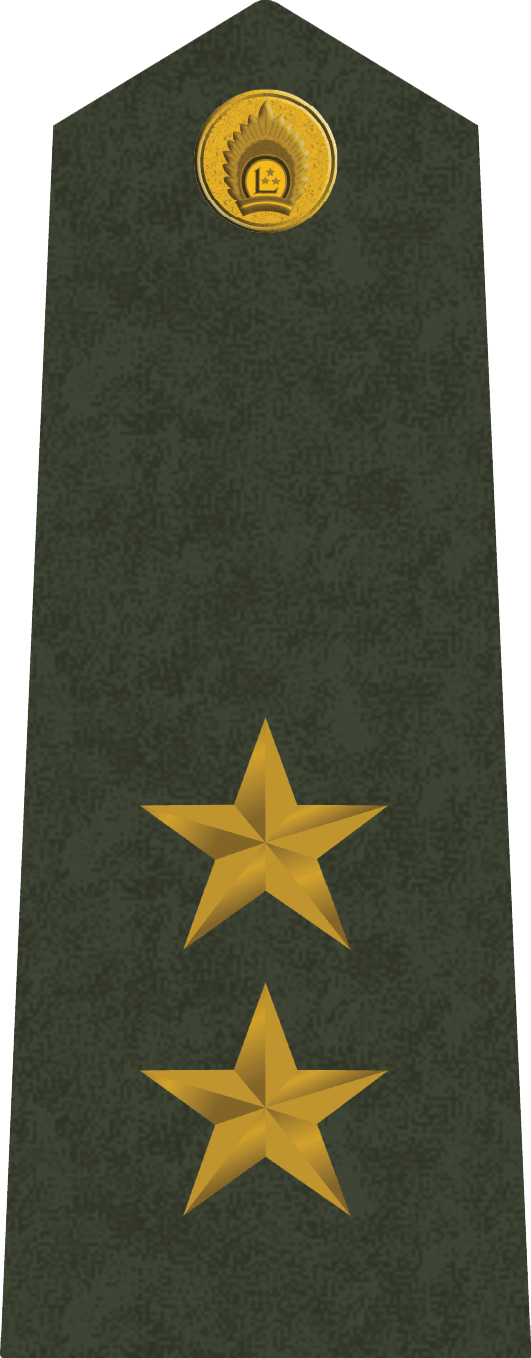
Virsleitnants
(Latvian Land Forces)

Vyresnysis leitenantas
(Lithuanian Land Forces)

Ахлах дэслэгч
Akhlakh deslegch
(Mongolian Ground Force)

Старший лейтена́нт
Stárshiy leytenánt
(Russian Ground Forces)

Nadporučík
(Slovak Ground Forces)

Nadporočnik
(Slovenian Ground Force)

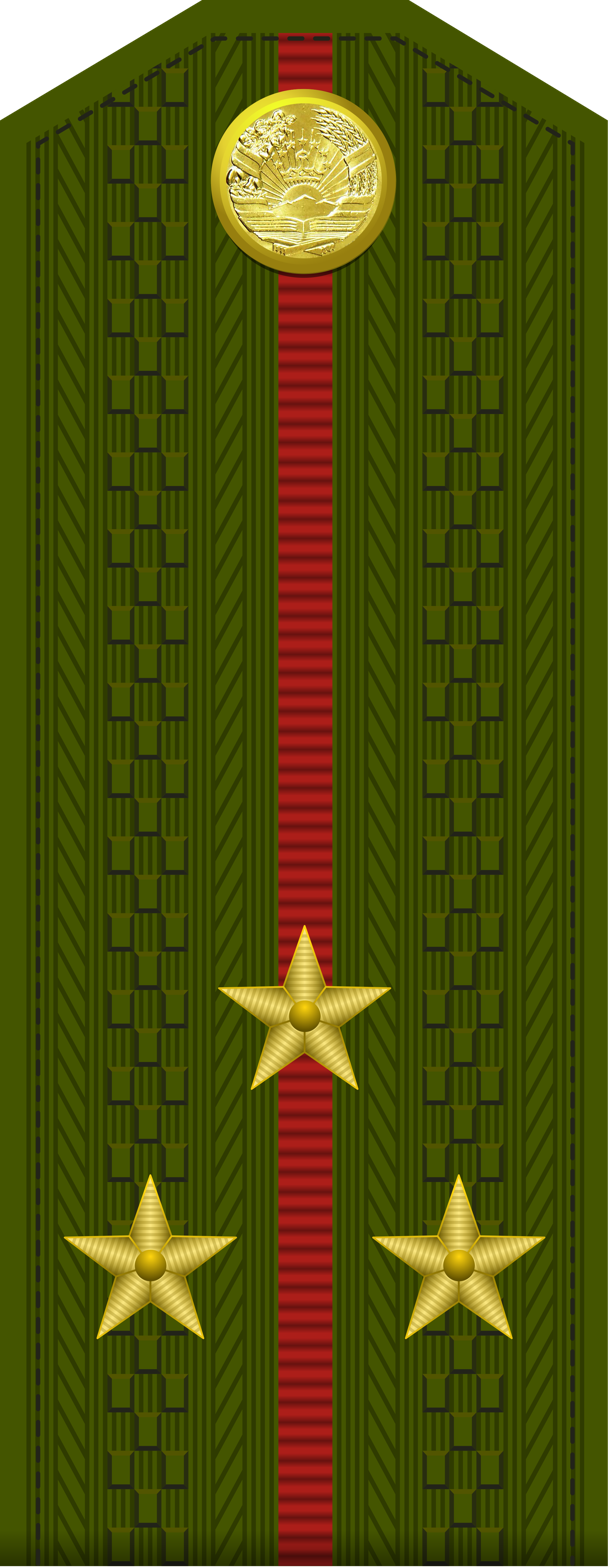
Лейтенанти калон
Lejtenanti kalon
(Tajik National Army)

Uly leýtenant
(Turkmen Ground Forces)

Старший лейтенант
Starshyy leytenant
(Ukrainian Ground Forces)

Katta leytenant
(Uzbek Ground Forces)
