= Comparative air force officer ranks of Post-Soviet states =

Rank comparison chart of all air forces of Post-Soviet states.

== Officers (OF 1–10) ==
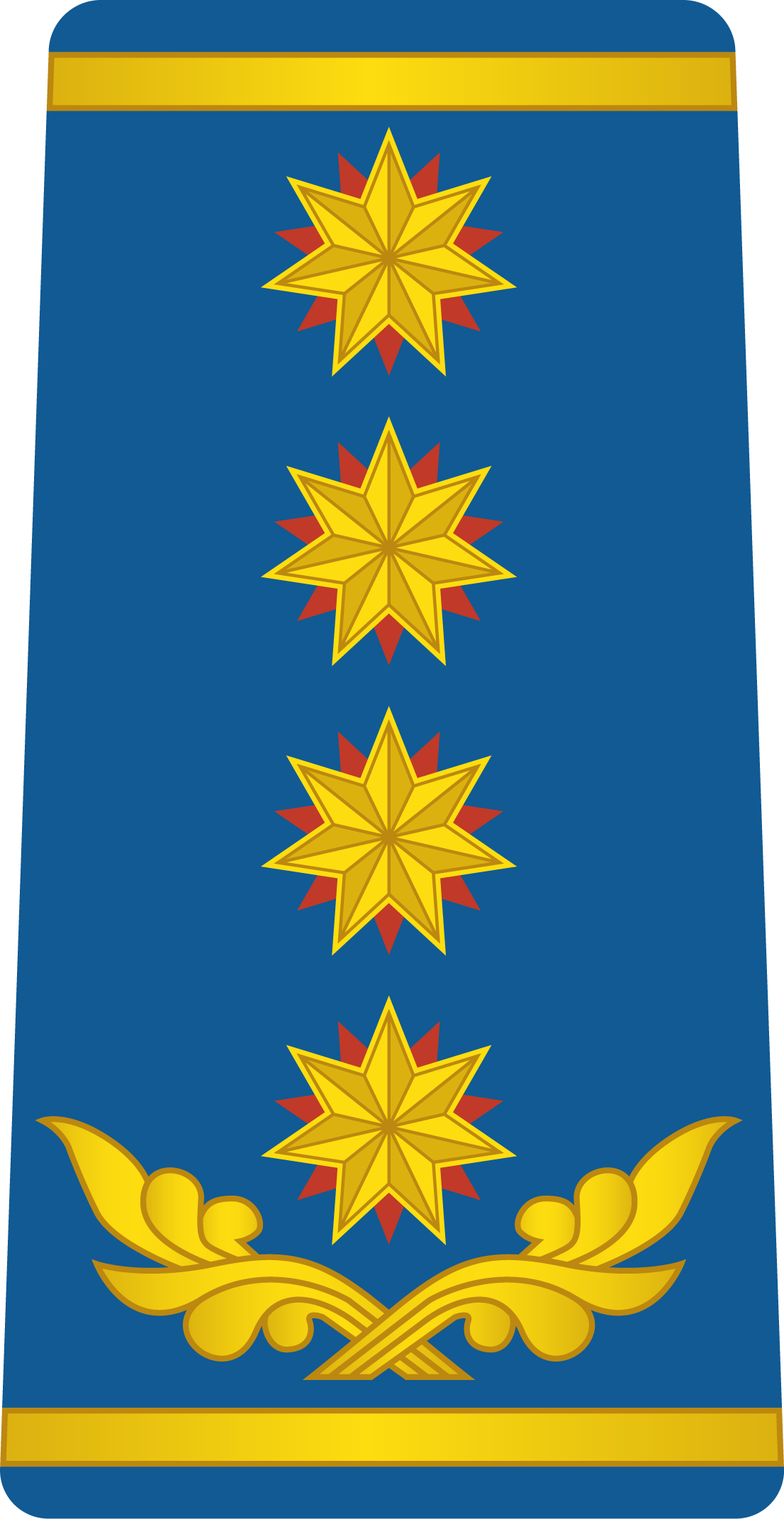
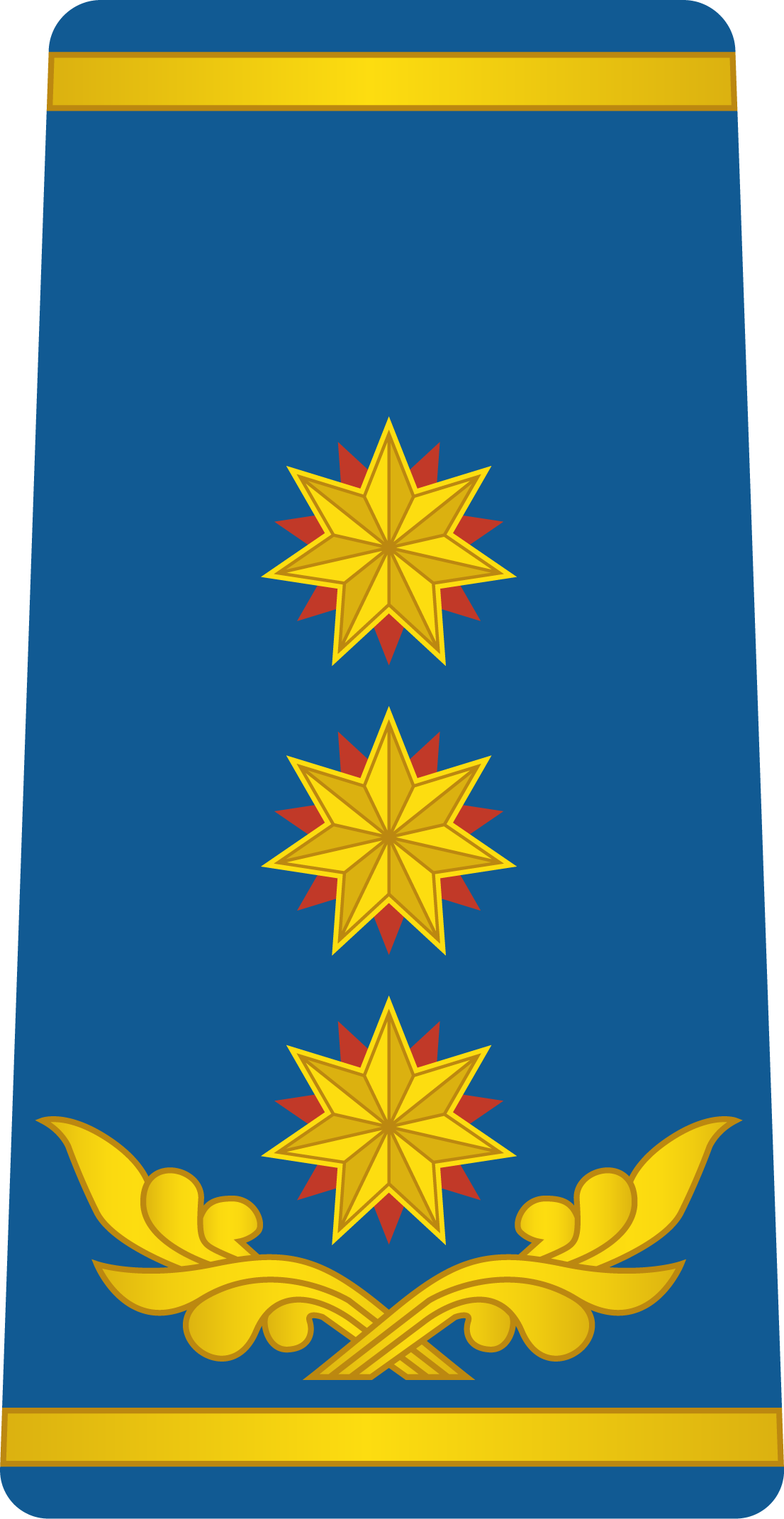
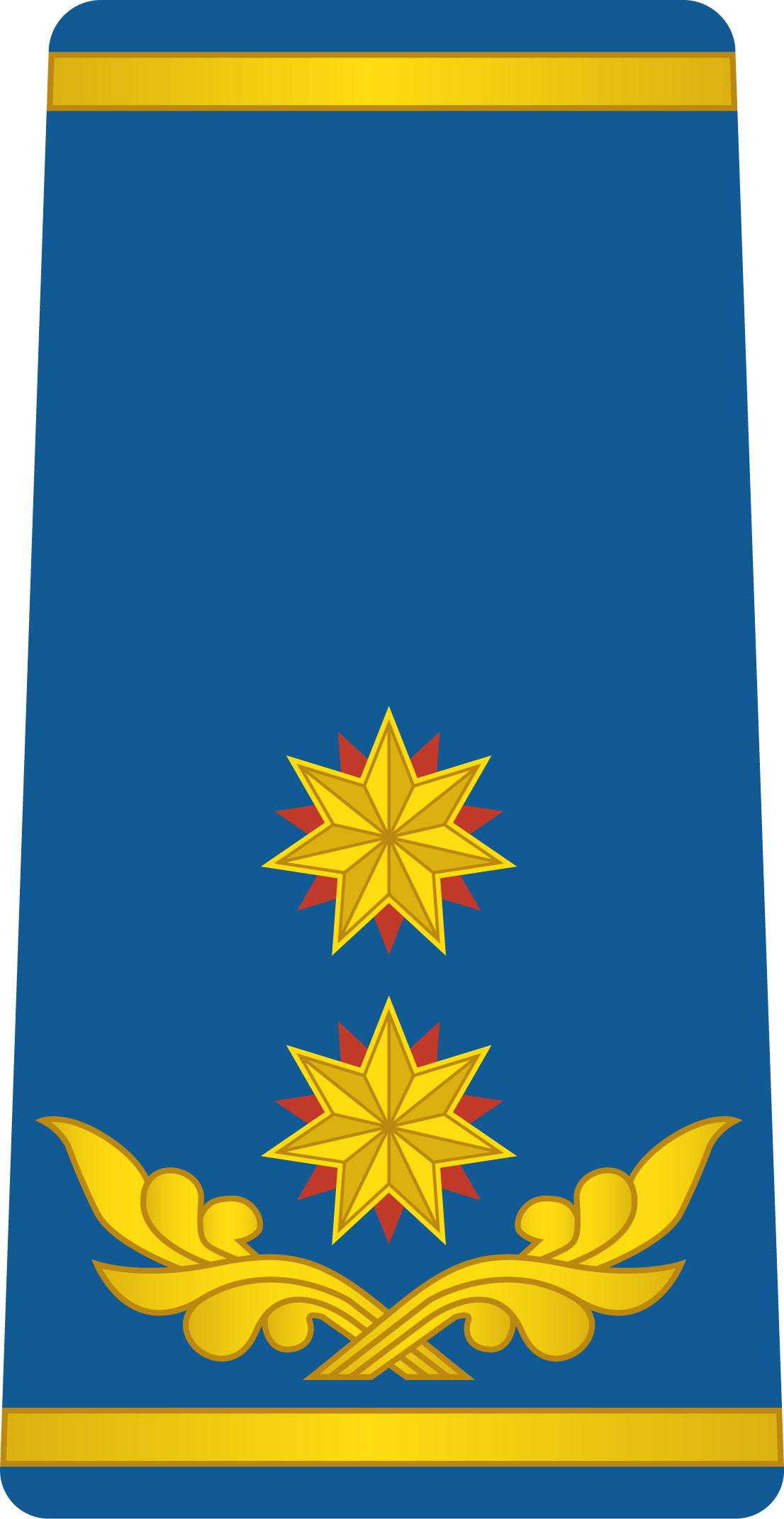
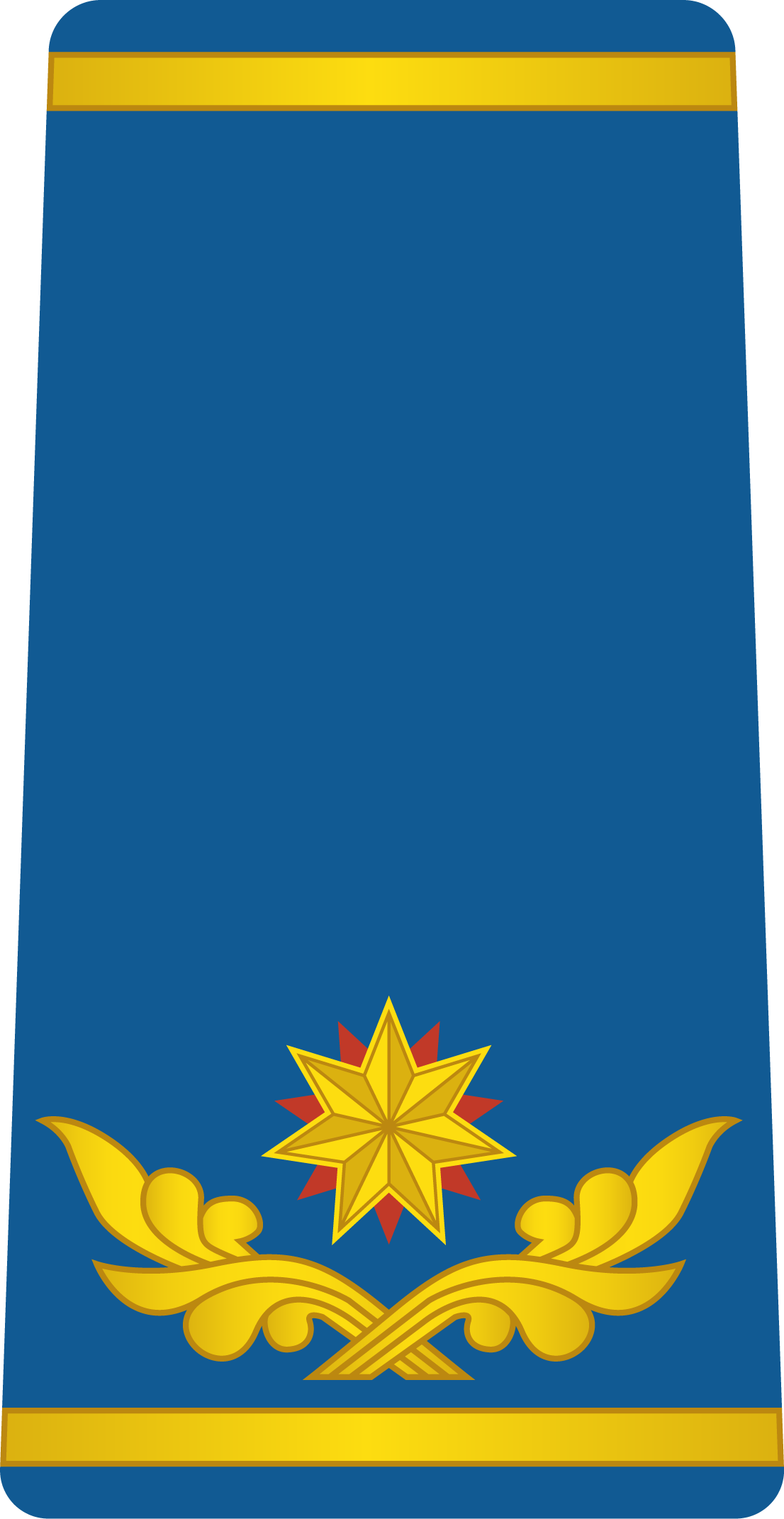
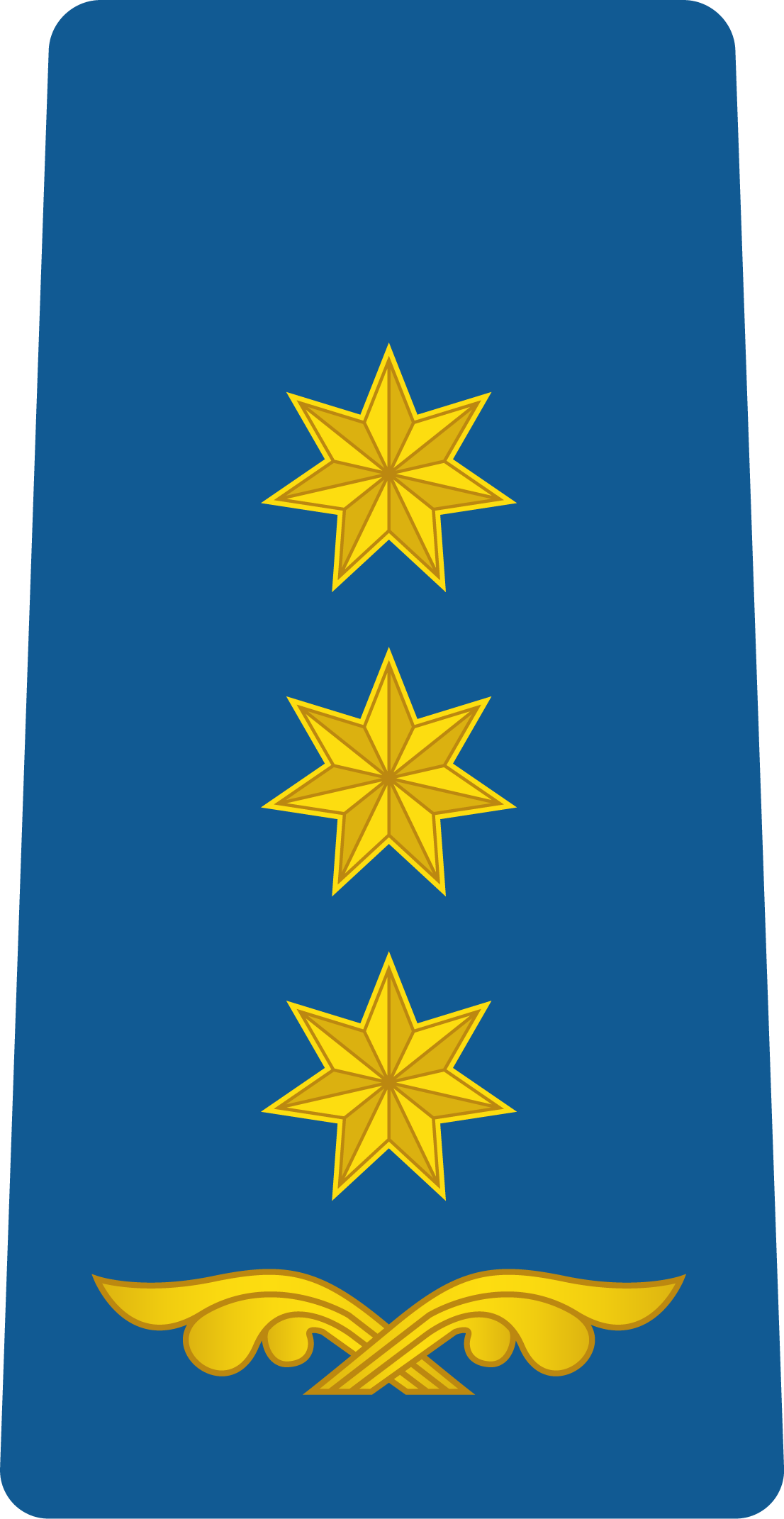
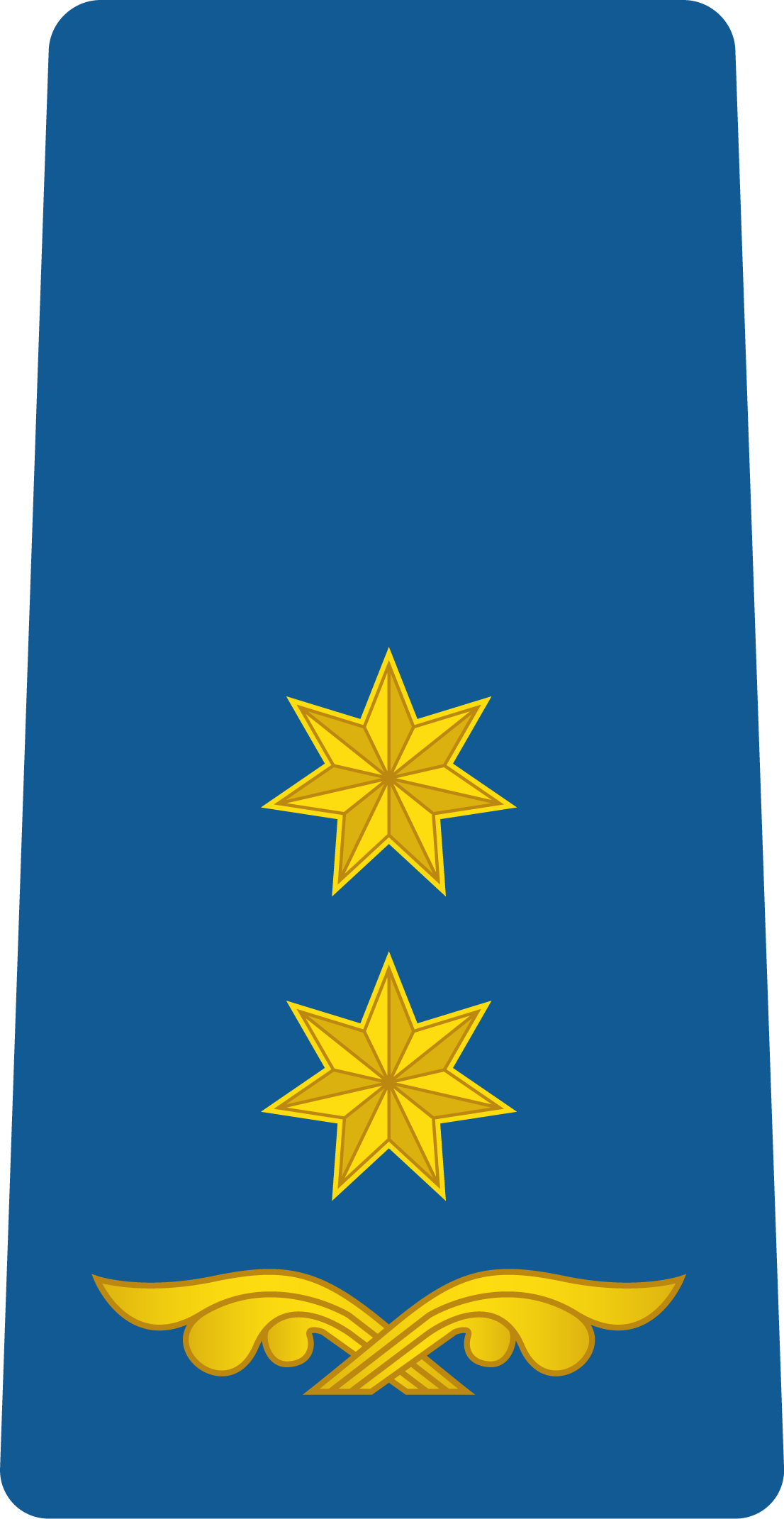
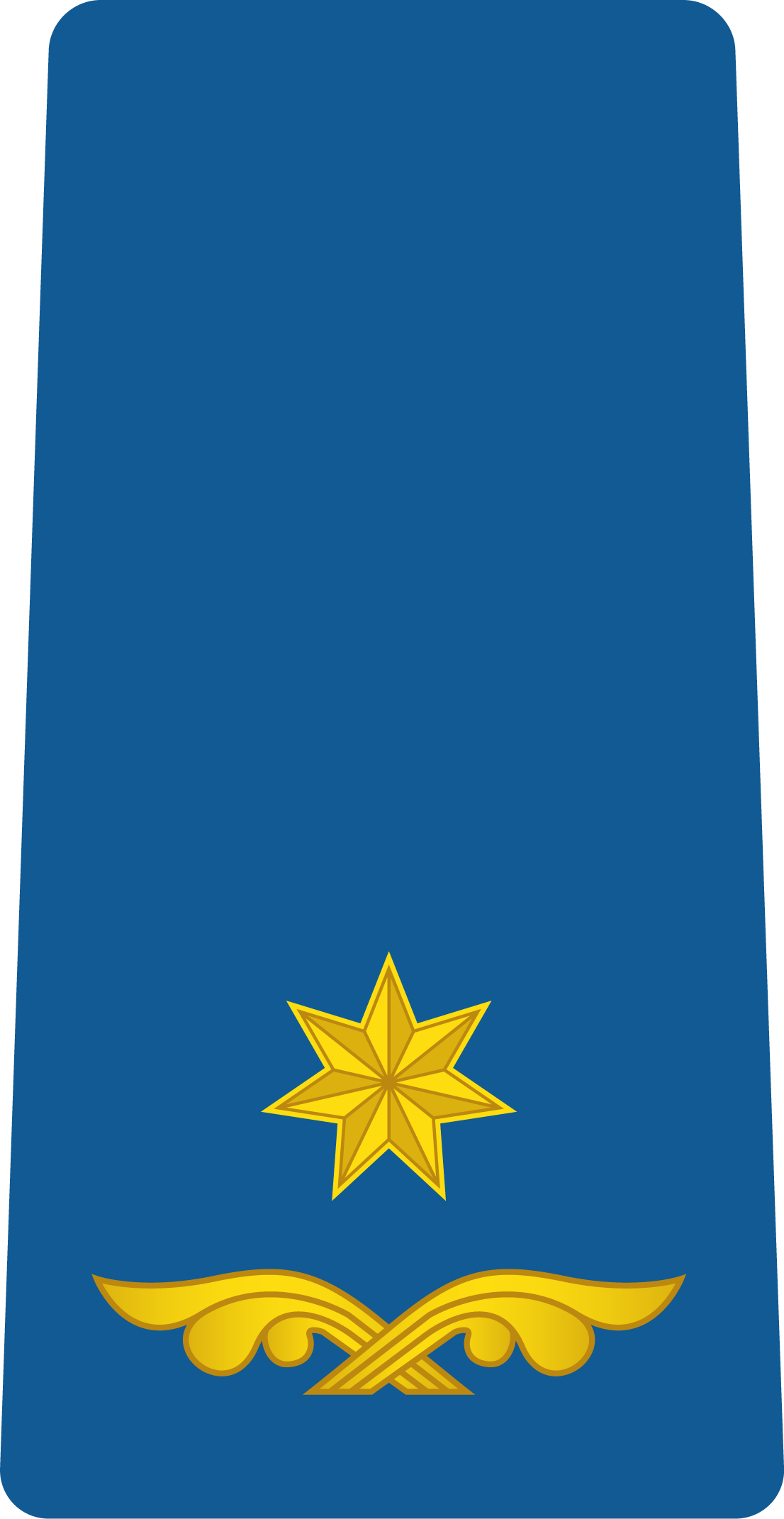
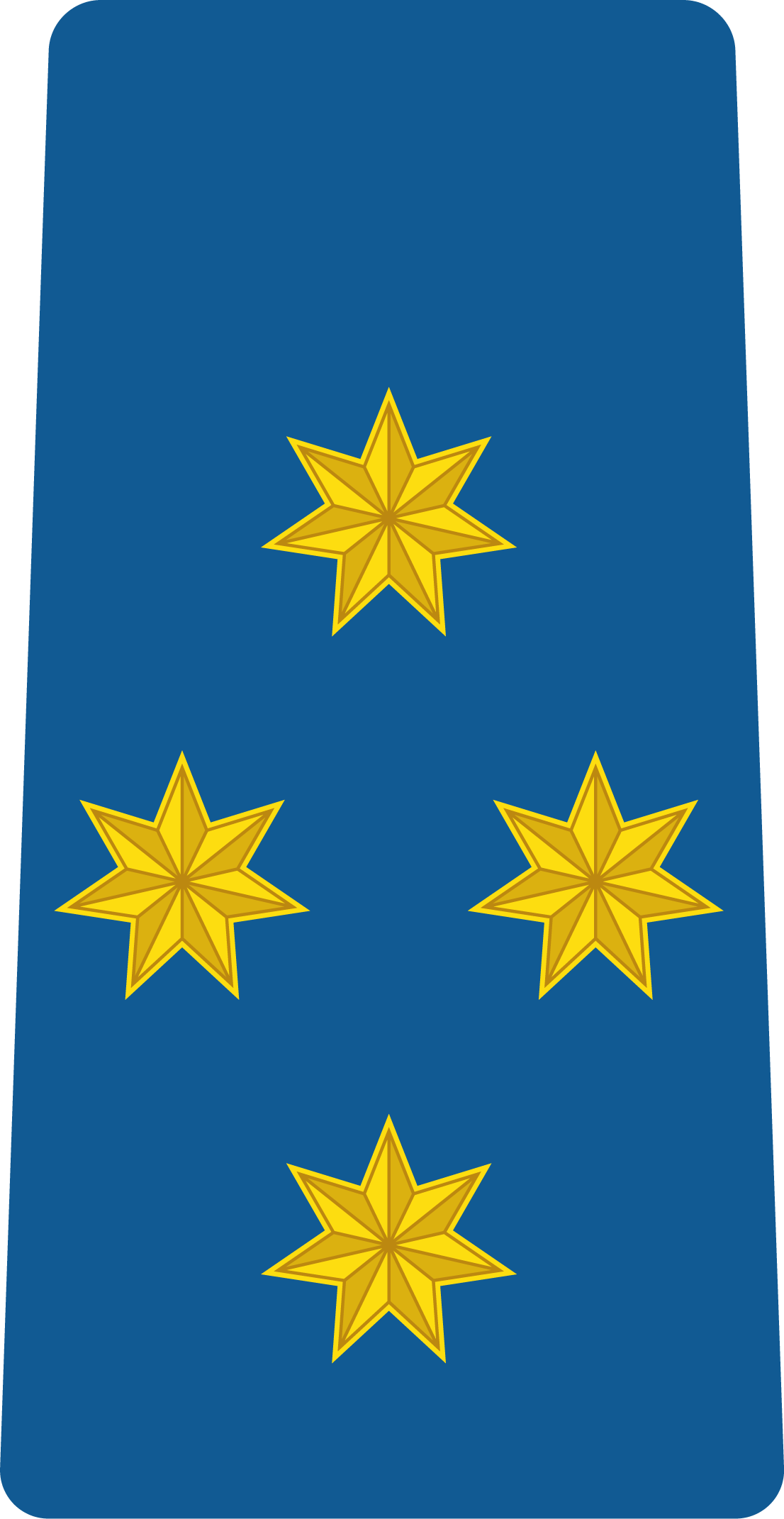
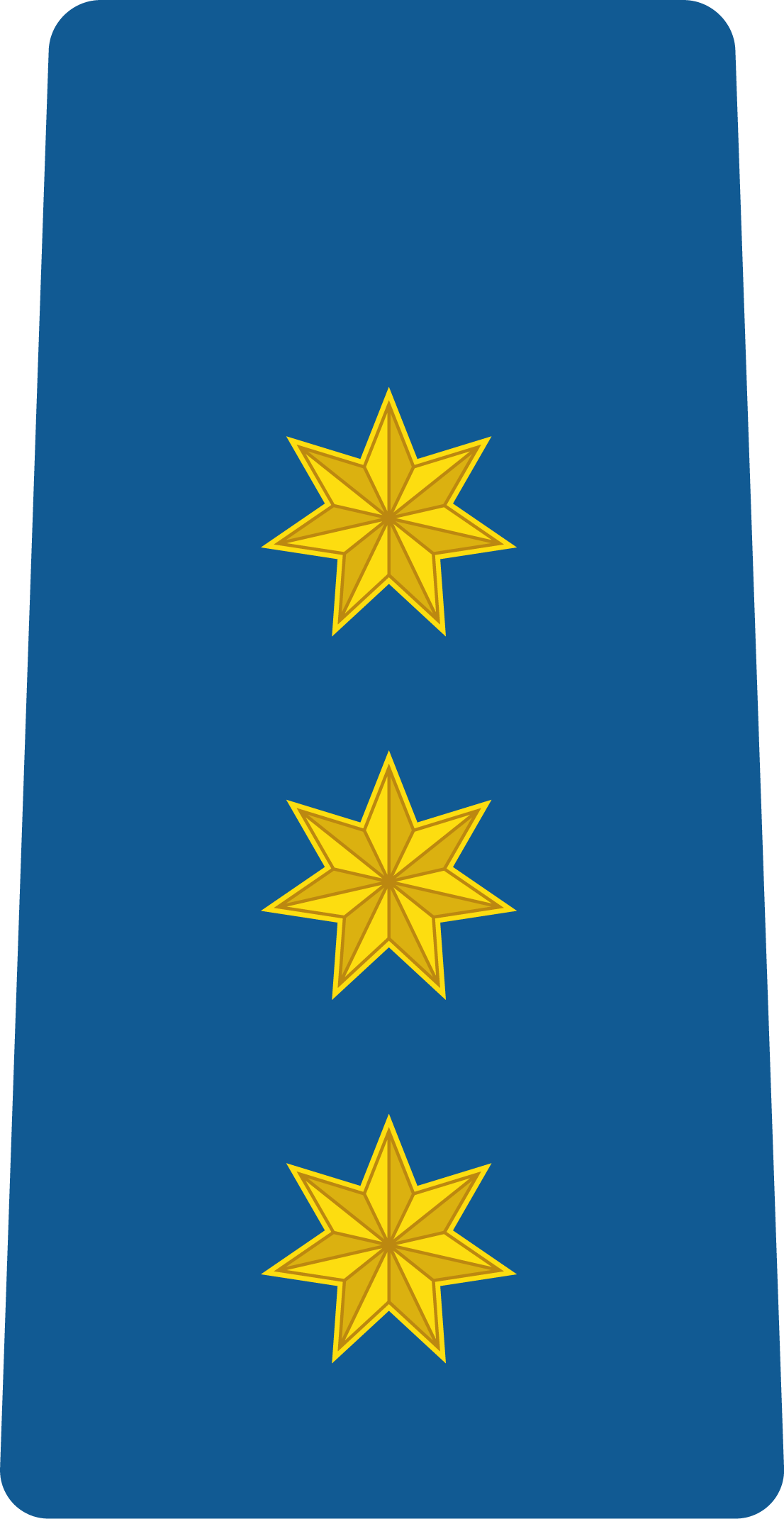
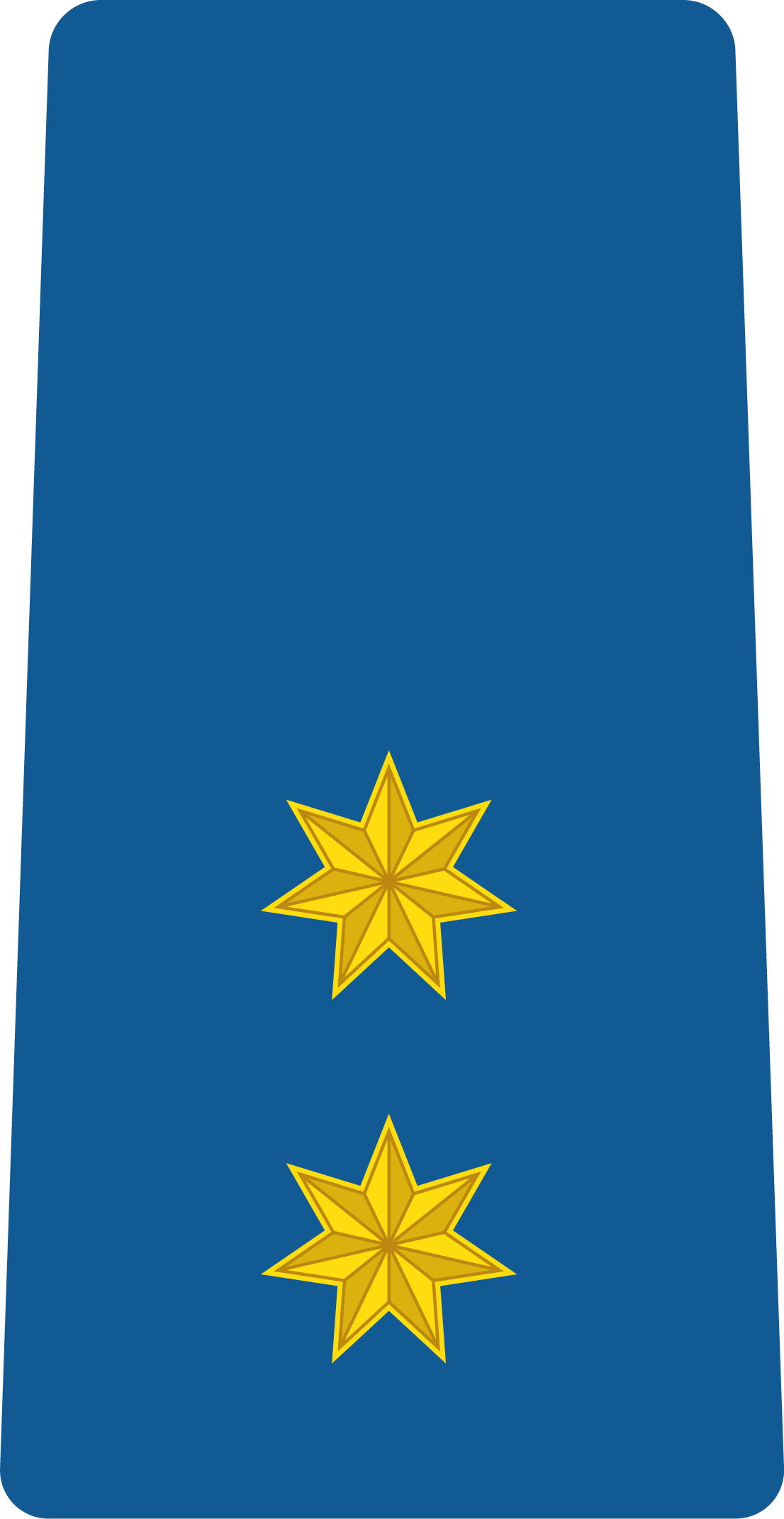
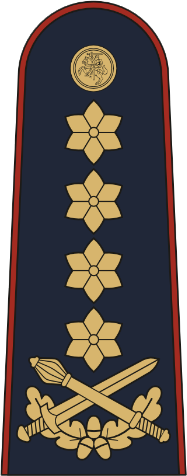
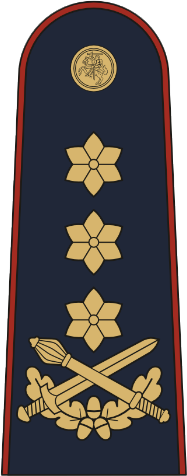
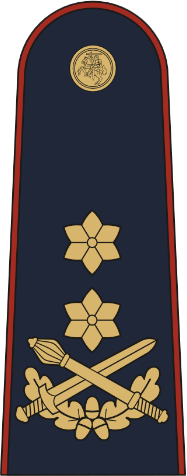
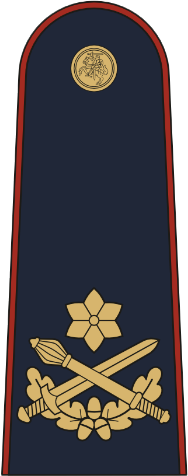
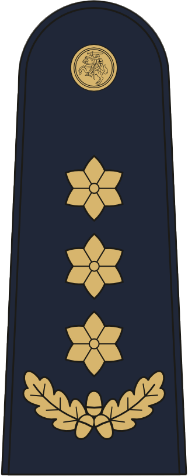
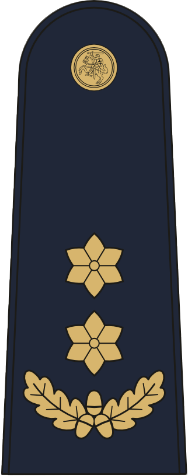
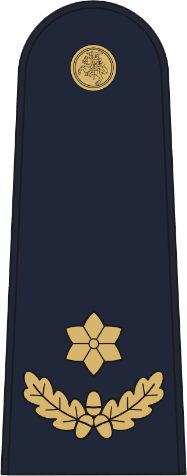
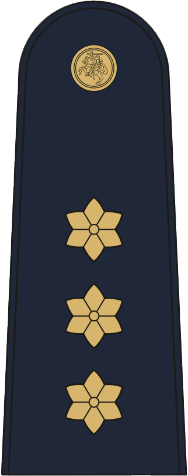
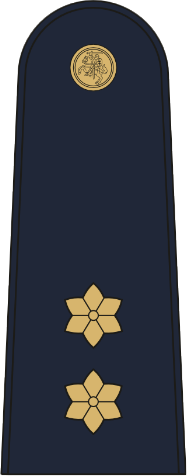
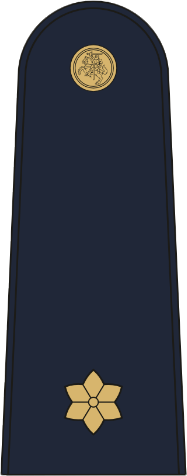
Rank group	General / flag officers					Senior officers			Junior officers
Armenian Air Force
Armenian Air Force		Բանակի գեներալ Banaki general	գեներալ-գնդապետ General-gndapet	գեներալ-լեյտենանտ General-leytenant	գեներալ-մայոր General-mayor	գնդապետ Gndapet	փոխգնդապետ P’vokhgndapet	մայոր Mayor	կապիտան Kapitan	ավագ լեյտենանտ Avag leytenant		լեյտենանտ Leytenant
Azerbaijani Air Force
Azerbaijani Air Force			General-polkovnik	General-leytenant	General-mayor	Polkovnik	Polkovnik-leytenant	Mayor	Kapitan	Baş leytenant	Leytenant	Kiçik leytenant
Belarusian Air Force
Belarusian Air Force			Ґенэрал-палкоўнік; G̀jeneral-palkoŭnik	Ґенэрал-лейтэнант; G̀jeneral-liejtenant	Ґенэрал-маёр; G̀jeneral-major	Палкоўнік; Palkoŭnik	Падпалкоўнік; Padpalkoŭnik	Маёр; Major	Капітан; Kapitan	Старшы лейтэнант Staršy liejtenant	Лейтэнант; Liejtenant	Малодшы лейтэнант Malodšy liejtenant
Estonian Air Force
Estonian Air Force		Kindral	Kindralleitnant	Kindralmajor	Brigaadikindral	Kolonel	Kolonelleitnant	Major	Kapten	Leitnant	Nooremleitnant	Lipnik
Georgian Air Force
Georgian Air Force		არმიის გენერალი Armiis generali	გენერალ ლეიტენანტი General leit’enant’i	გენერალ მაიორი General maiori	ბრიგადის გენერალი Brigadis generali	პოლკოვნიკი P’olk’ovnik’i	ლეიტენანტ პოლკოვნიკი Leit’enant’ p’olk’ovnik’i	მაიორი Maiori	კაპიტანი K’ap’it’ani	უფროსი ლეიტენანტი Uprosi leit’enant’i		ლეიტენანტი Leit’enant’i
Rank group	General / flag officers					Senior officers			Junior officers
Kazakh Air Defense Forces
Kazakh Air Defense Forces	Жоғарғы Бас қолбасшының Joğarğı Bas qolbasşınıñ		Генерал-Полҝвниҝ; General-polkovnïk	Генерал-лейтенант; General-leytenant	Генерал-майор; General-mayor	Полковник; Polkovnïk	Подполковник; Podpolkovnïk	Майор; Mayor	Капитан; Kapïtan	Аға лейтенант Ağa leytenant		Лейтенант; Leytenant
Kyrgyz Air Force
Kyrgyz Air Force					Генерал-майор; General-mayor	Полковник; Polkovnik	Подполковник; Podpolkovnik	Майор; Mayor	Капитан; Kapitan	Улук лейтенант Uluk leytenant	Лейтенант; Leytenant	Кенже лейтенант Kenje leytenant
Latvian Air Force
Latvian Air Force			Ģenerālleitnants	Ģenerālmajors	Brigādes ģenerālis	Pulkvedis	Pulkvežleitnants	Majors	Kapteinis	Virsleitnants		Leitnants
Lithuanian Air Force
Lithuanian Air Force		Generolas	Generolas leitenantas	Generolas majoras	Brigados generolas	Pulkininkas	Pulkininkas leitenantas	Majoras	Kapitonas	Vyresnysis leitenantas		Leitenantas
Moldova Air Force
Moldova Air Force			General de corp de armată	General de divizie	General de brigadă	Colonel	Locotenent-colonel	Maior	Căpitan	Locotenent-major		Locotenent
Rank group	General / flag officers					Senior officers			Junior officers
Russian Aerospace Forces
Russian Aerospace Forces		Генера́л а́рмии Generál ármii	Генера́л-полко́вник; Generál-polkóvnik	Генера́л-лейтена́нт; Generál-leytenánt	Генера́л-майо́р; Generál-mayór	Полко́вник; Polkóvnik	Подполко́вник; Podpolkóvnik	Майо́р; Majór	Kапита́н; Kapitán	Старший лейтена́нт Stárshiy leytenánt	Лейтенант; Leytenant	Mла́дший лейтена́нт Mládshiy leytenánt
Tajik Air Force
Tajik Air Force			Генерал-полковник; General-polkovnik	Генерал-лейтенант; General-leytenant	Генерал-майор; General-mayor	Полковник; Polkovnik	Подполковник; Podpolkovnik	Майор; Mayor	Капитан; Kapitan	Лейтенанти калон Leytenanti kalon	Лейтенант; Leytenant	Лейтенанти хурд Leytenanti xurd
Turkmen Air Force
Turkmen Air Force			General-polkownik	General-leýtenant	General-maýor	Polkownik	Podpolkownik	Maýor	Kapitan	Uly leýtenant	Leýtenant	Kiçi leýtenant
Ukrainian Air Force
Ukrainian Air Force		Генерал; Heneral	Генерал-лейтенант; Heneral-leytenant	Генерал-майор; Heneral-mayor	Бригадний генерал Bryhadnyy heneral	Полковник; Polkovnyk	Підполковник; Pidpolkovnyk	Майор; Mayor	Капітан; Kapitan	Старший лейтенант Starshyy leytenant	Лейтенант; Leytenant	Молодший лейтенант Molodshyy leytenant
Uzbekistan Air and Air Defence Forces
Uzbekistan Air and Air Defence Forces			General-polkovnik	General-leytenant	General-mayor	Polkovnik	Podpolkovnik	Mayor	Kapitan	Katta leytenant		Leytenant
Rank group	General / flag officers					Senior officers			Junior officers

== See also ==
- Comparative air force officer ranks of Asia
- Comparative air force officer ranks of Europe
