= Comparative air force officer ranks of Asia =

Rank comparison chart of air forces of Asian states.

== Officers ==
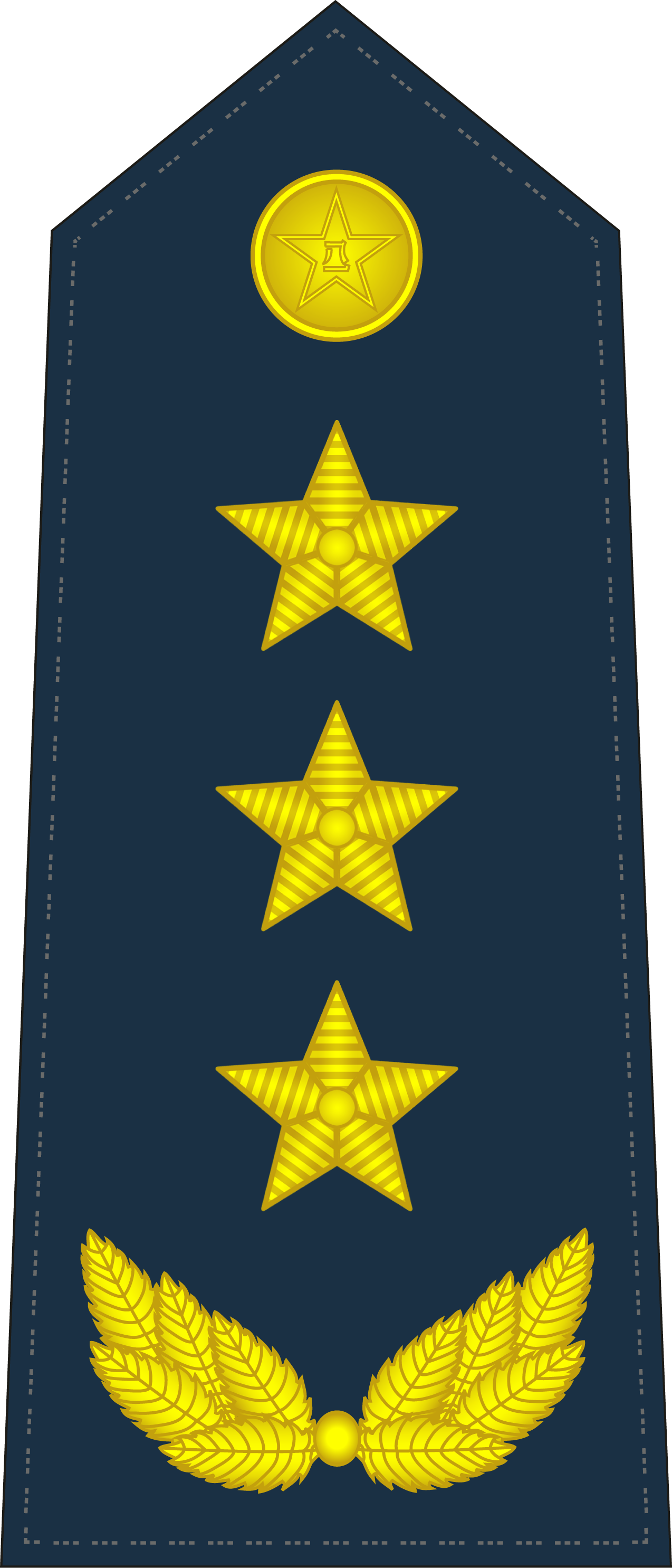
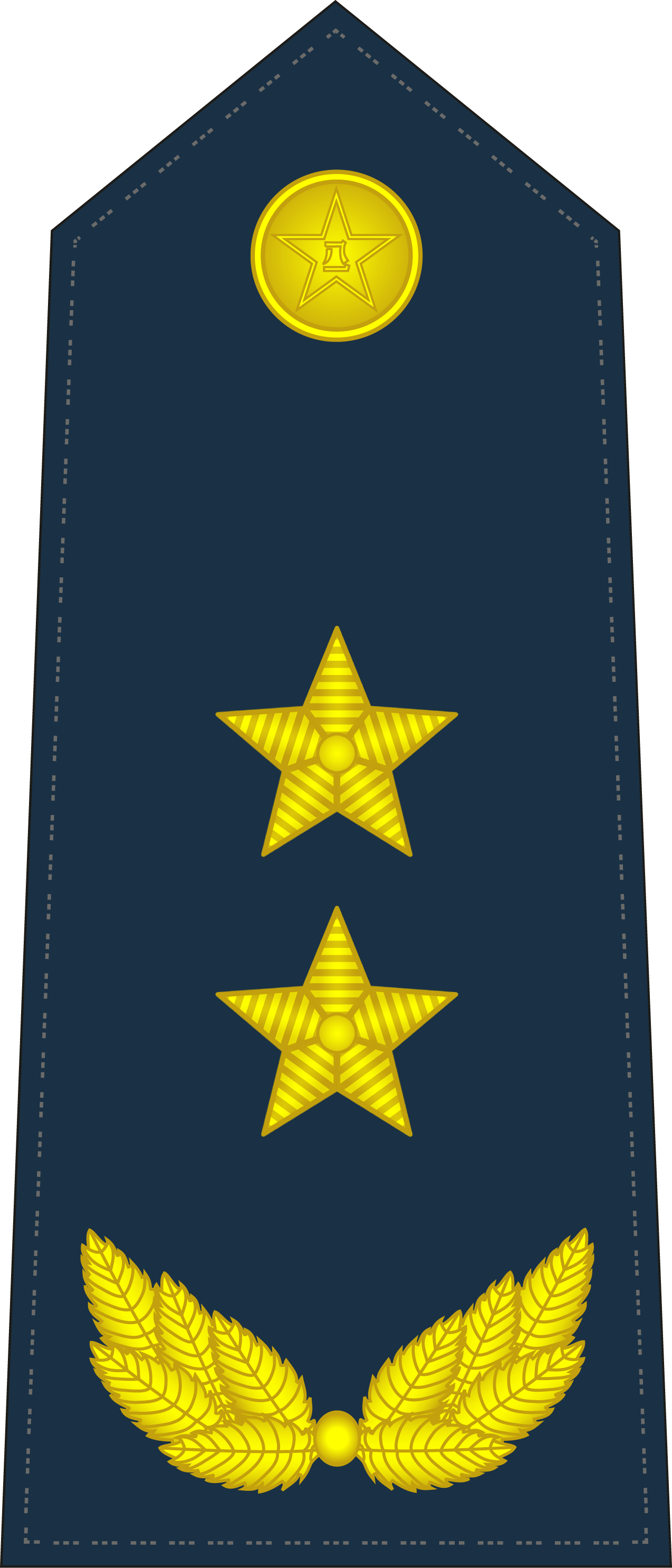
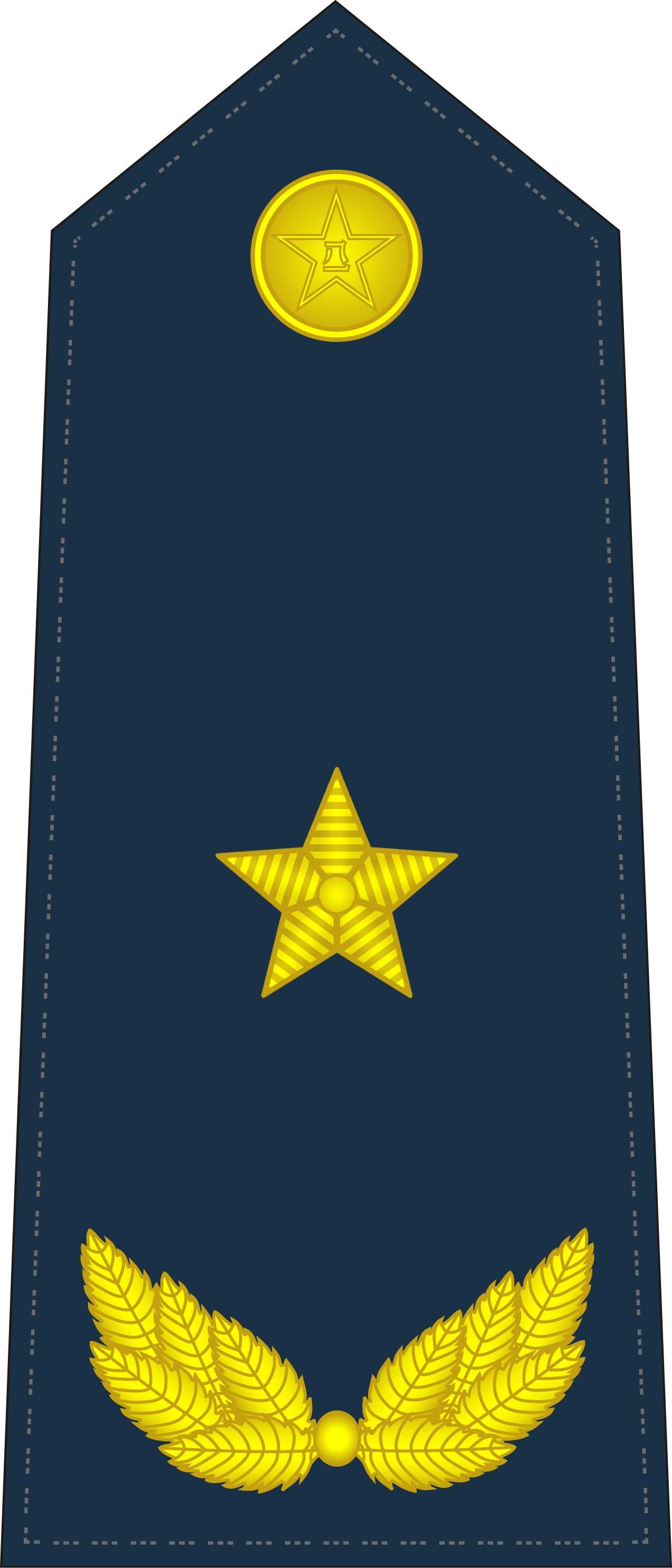
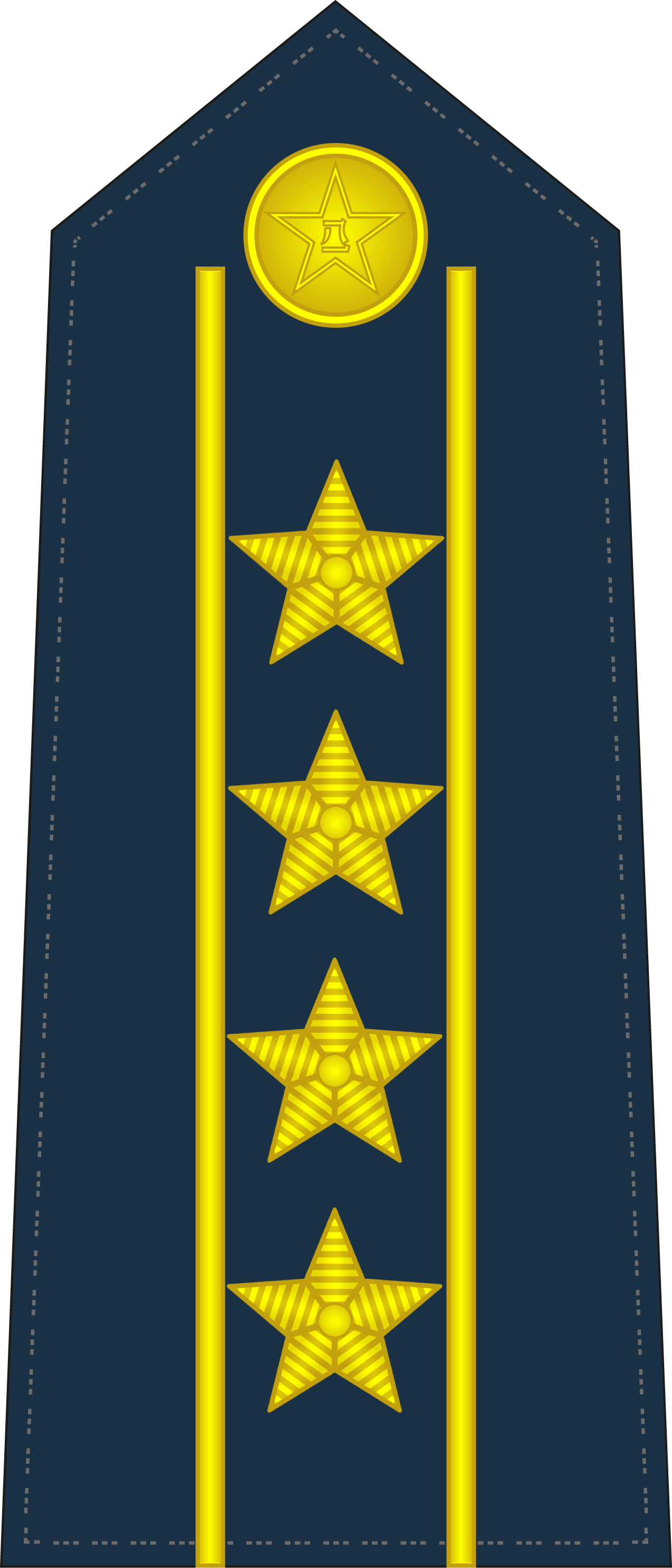
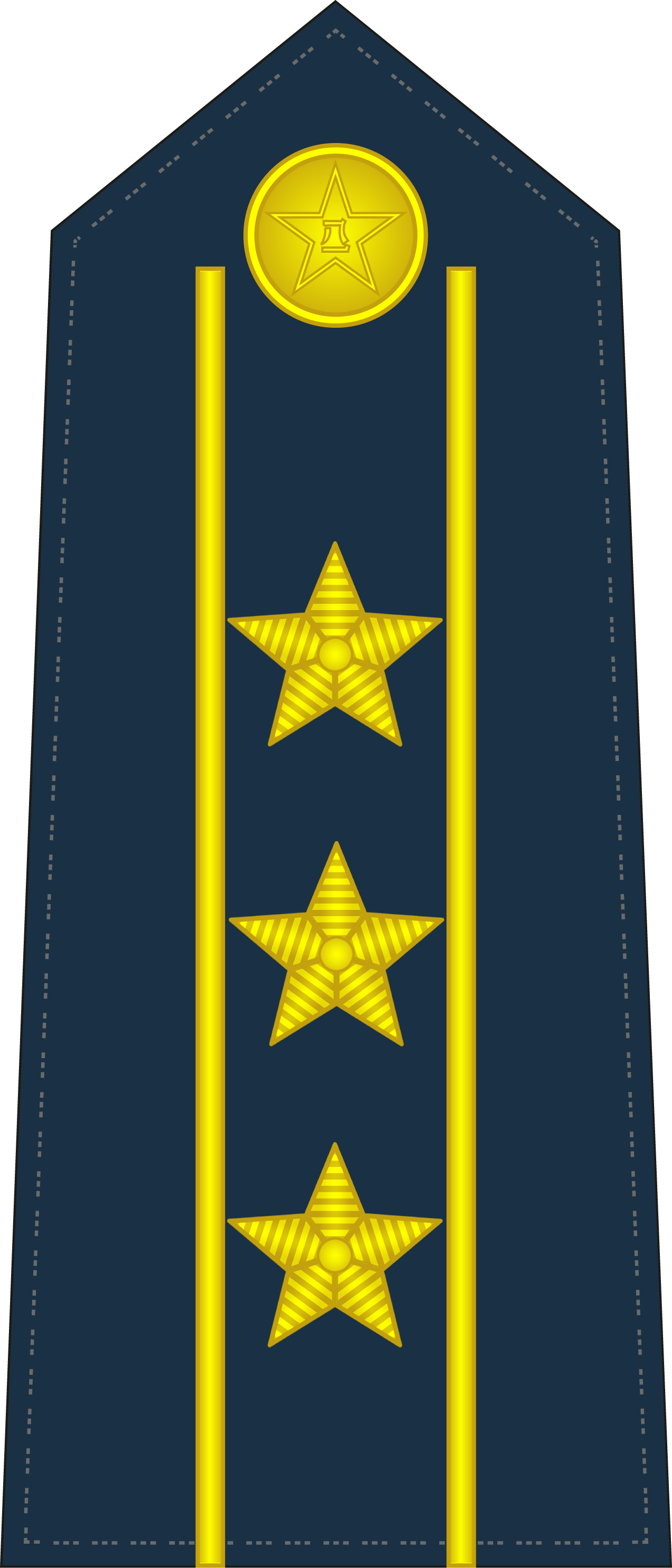
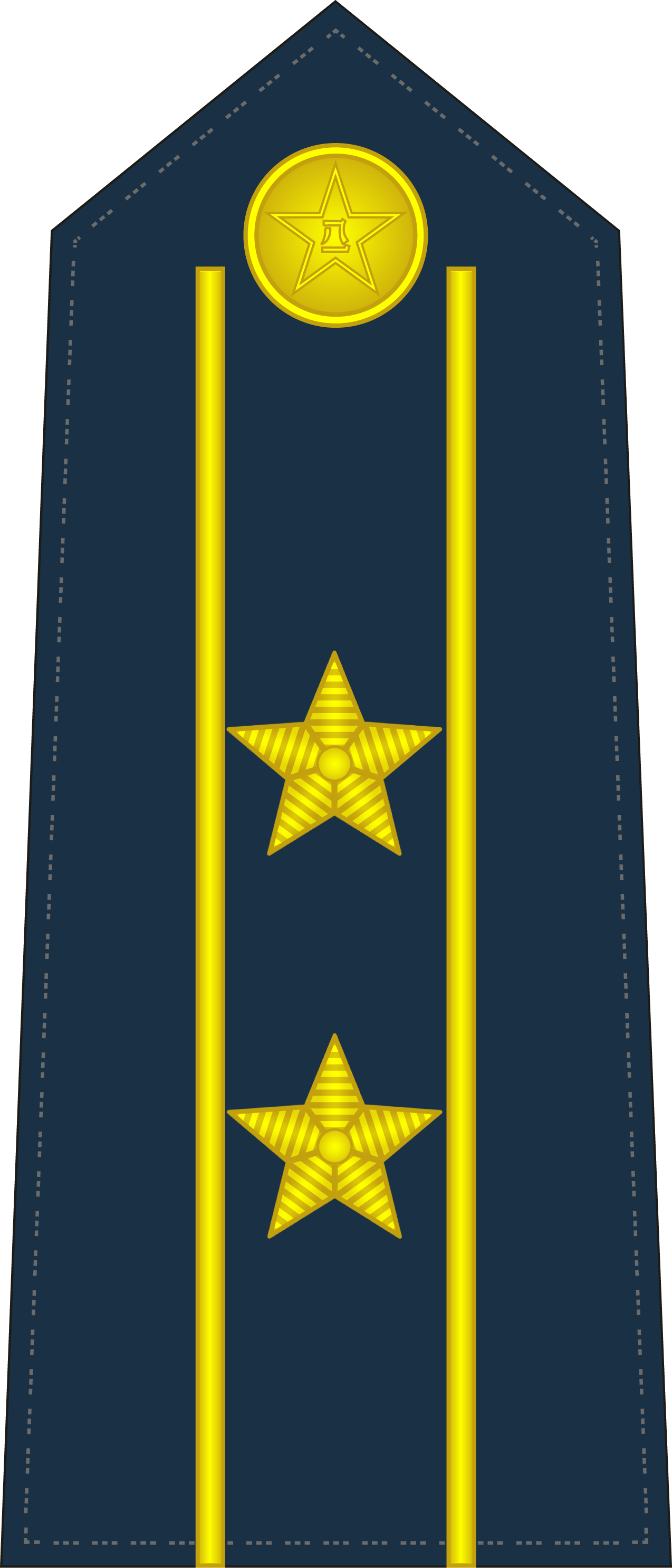
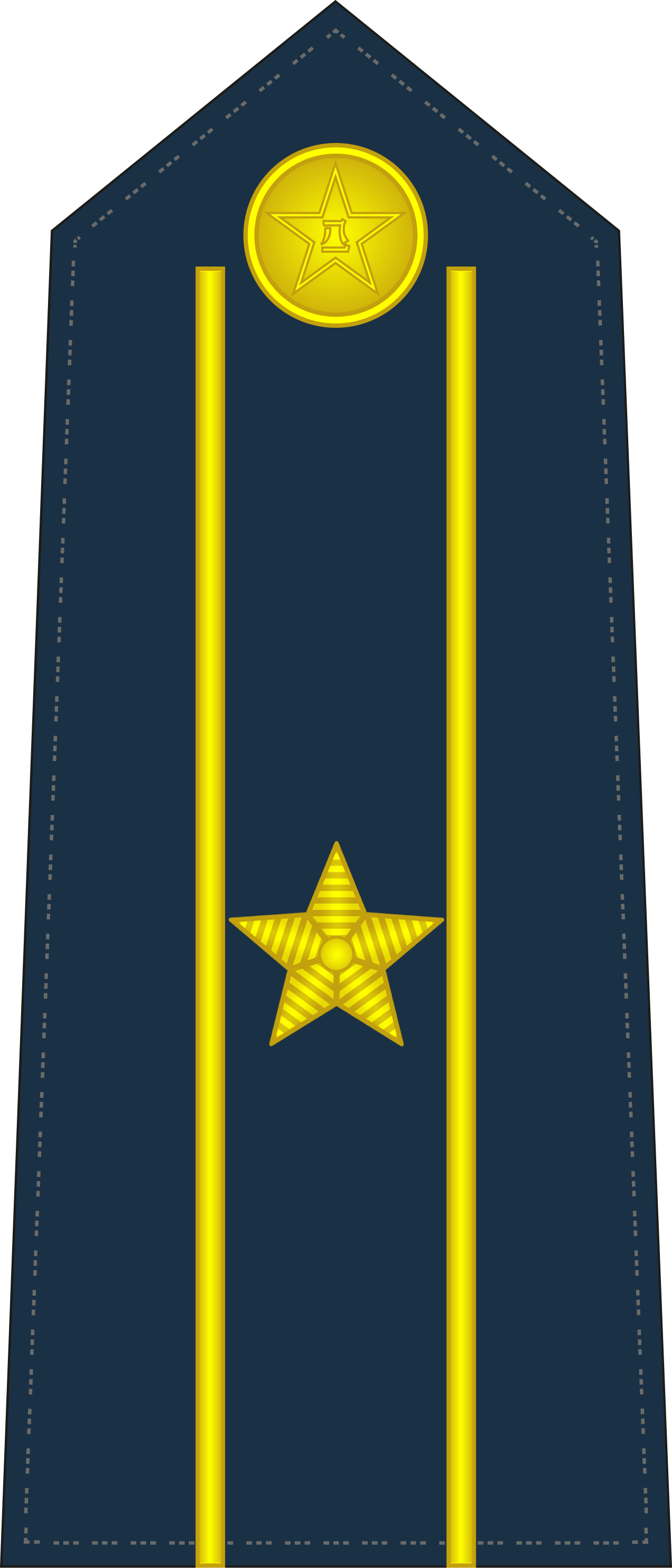
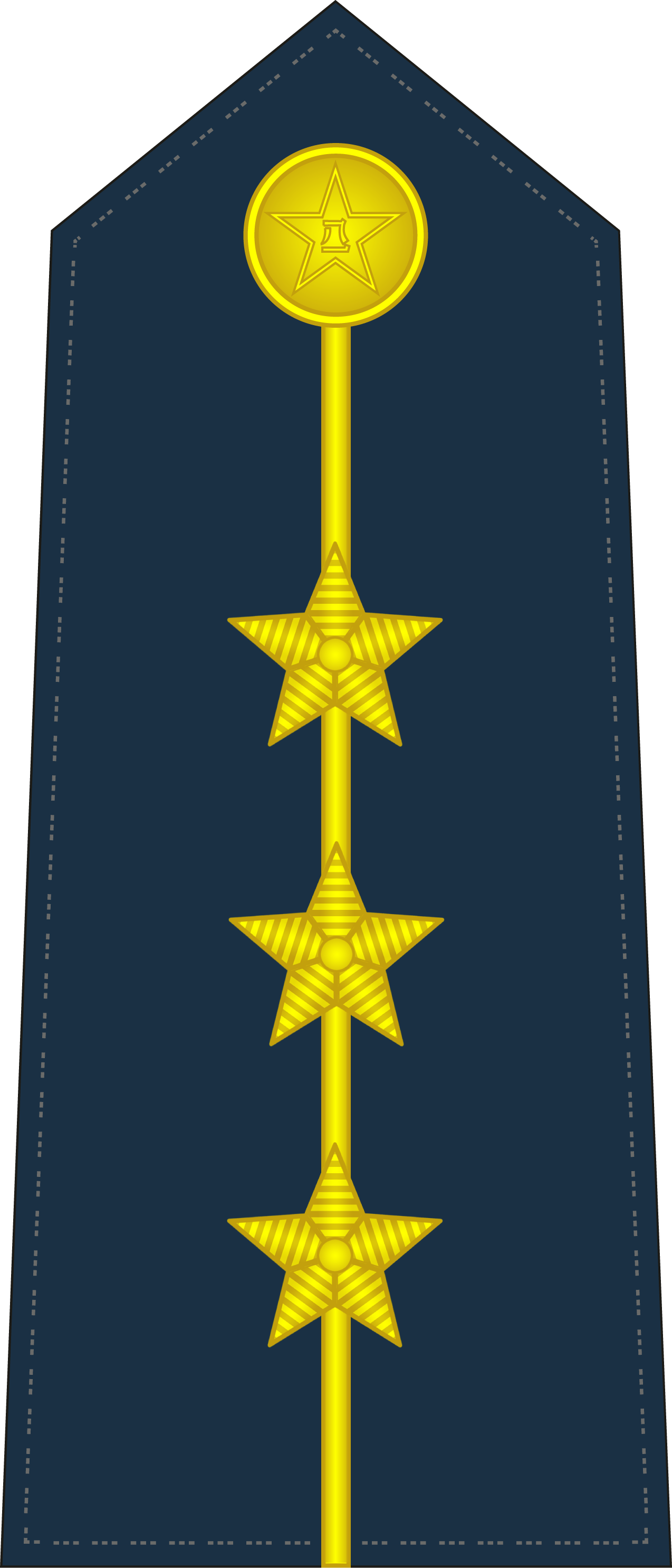
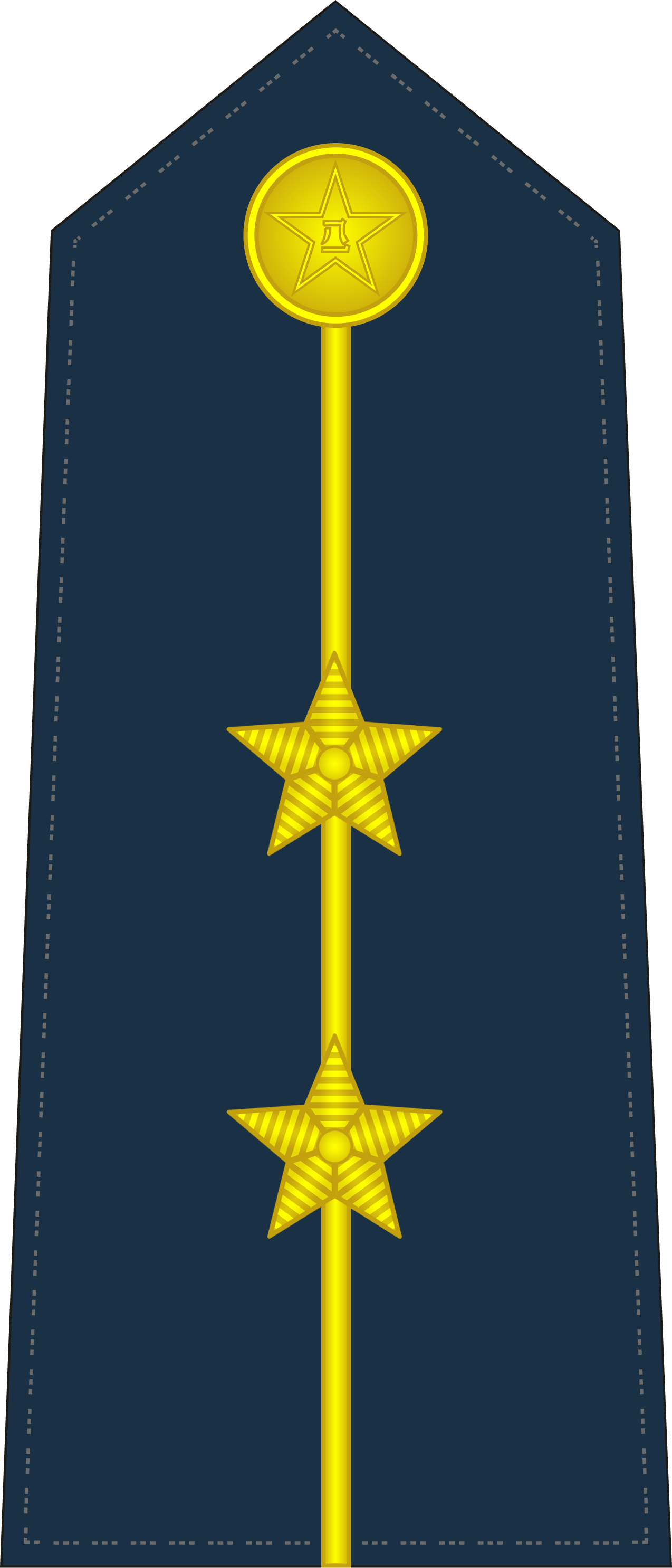
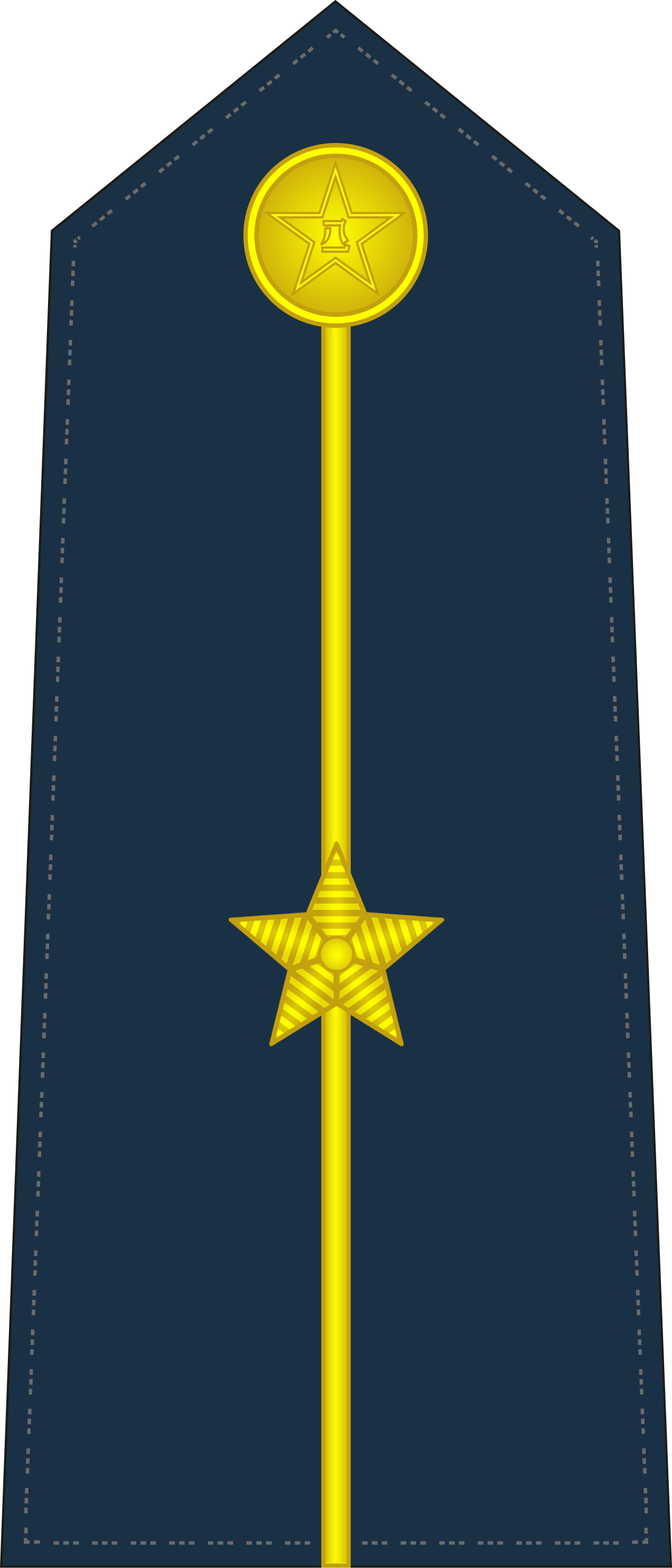
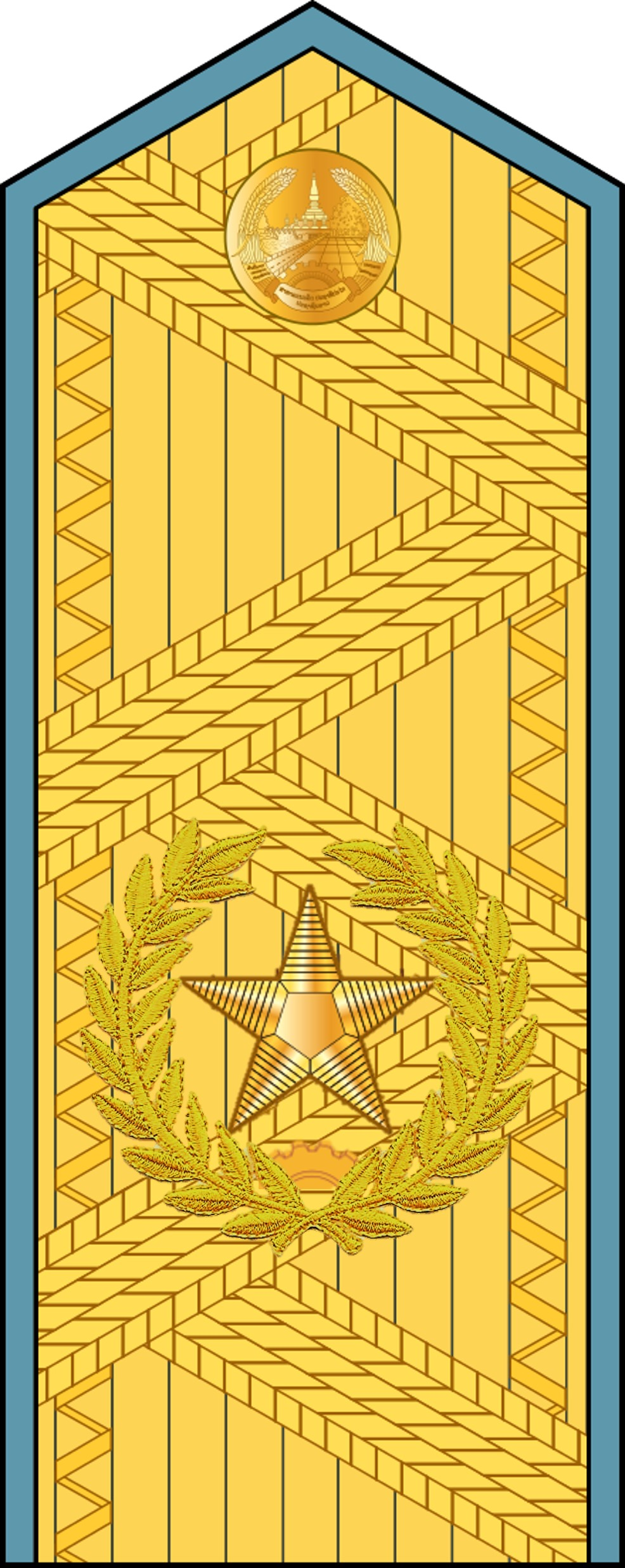
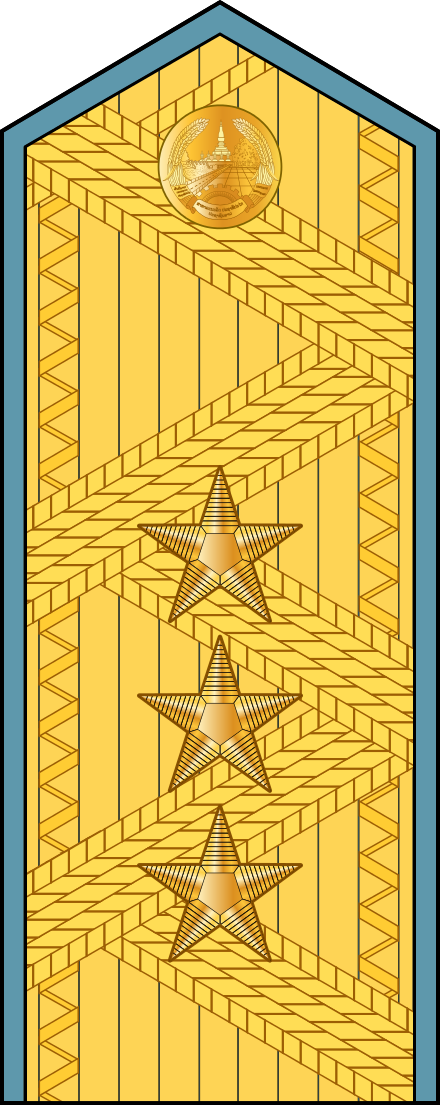
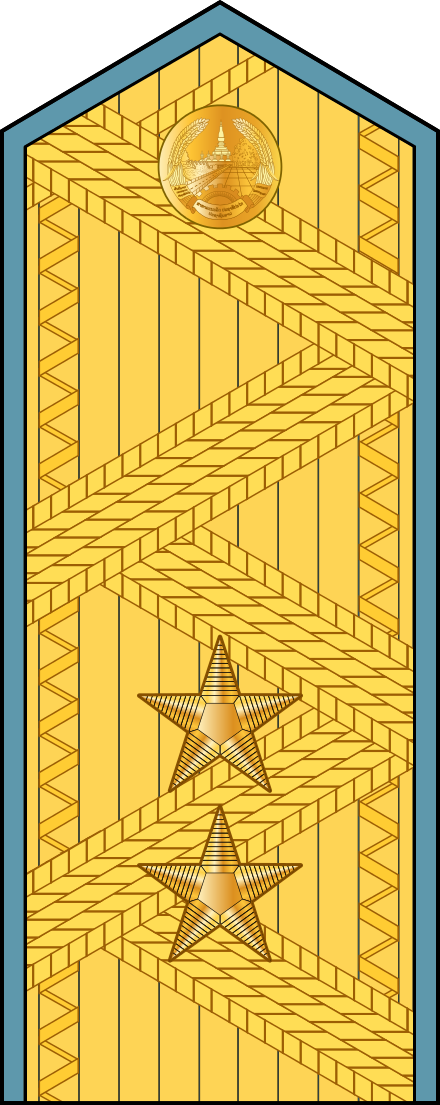
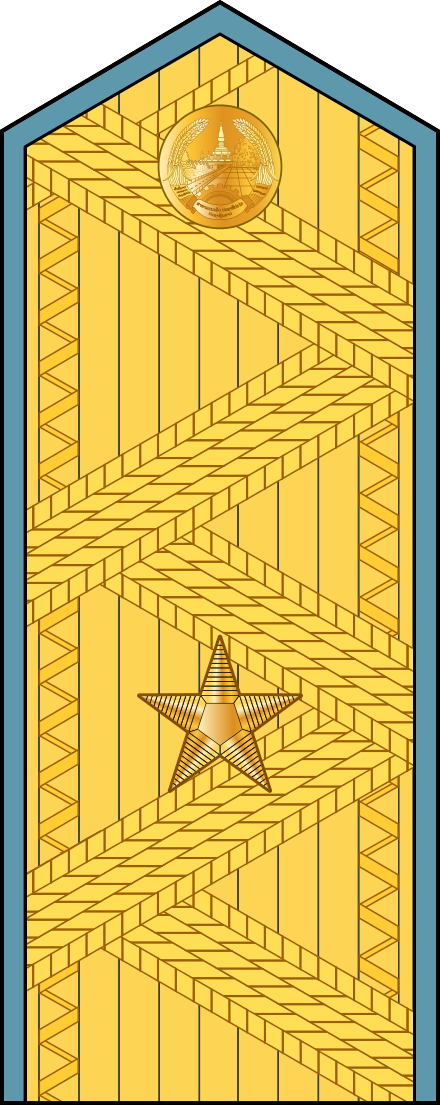
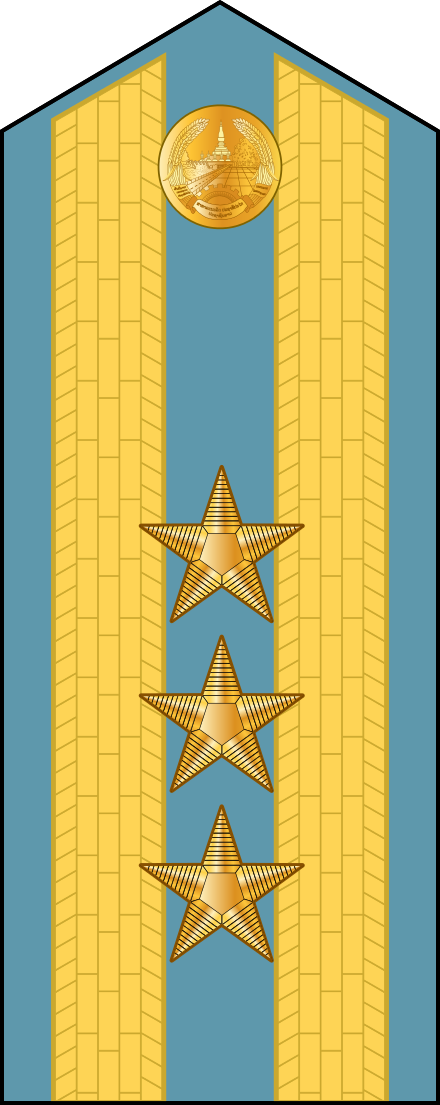
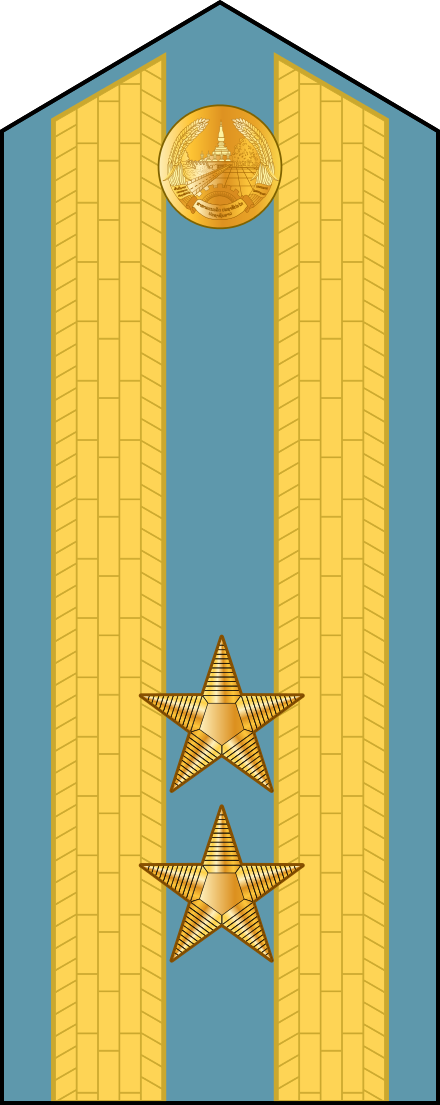
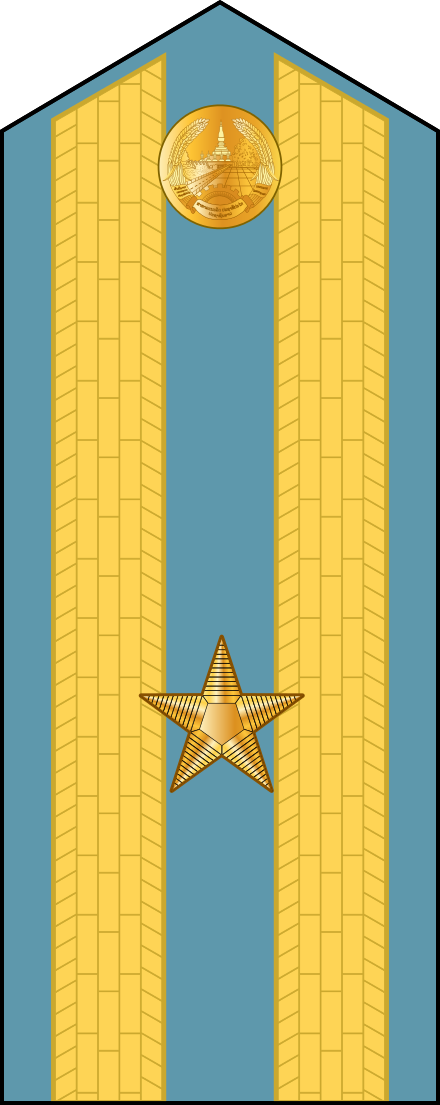
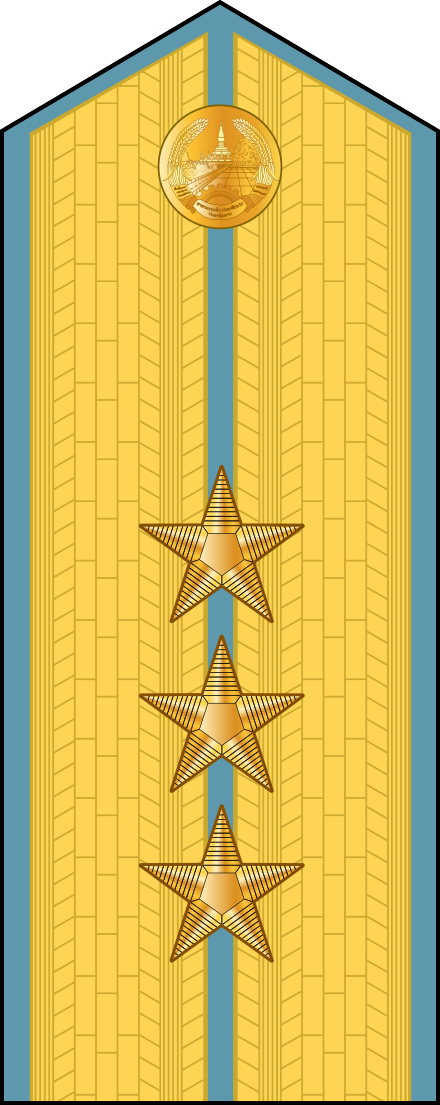
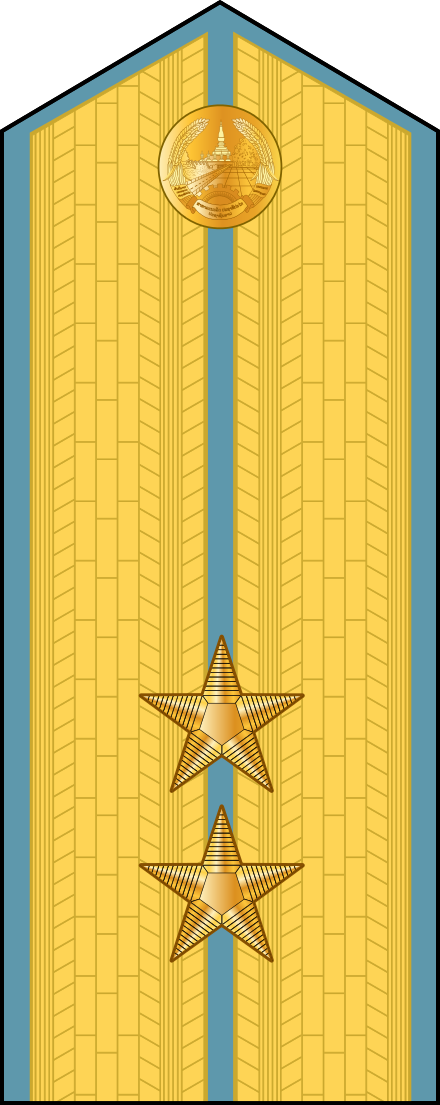
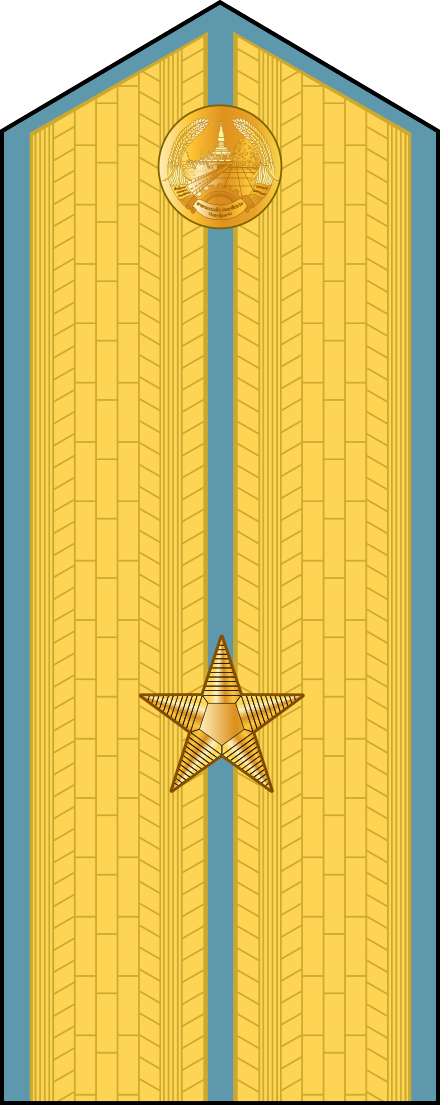
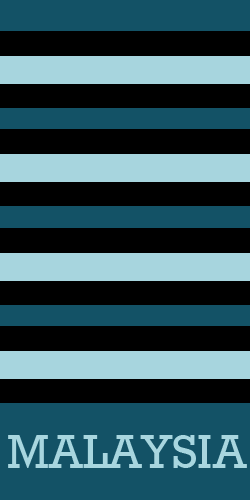
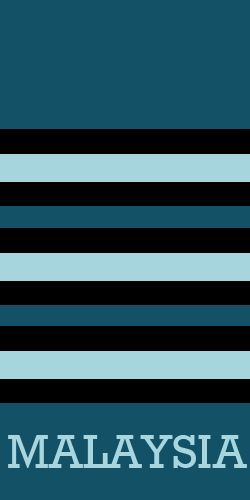
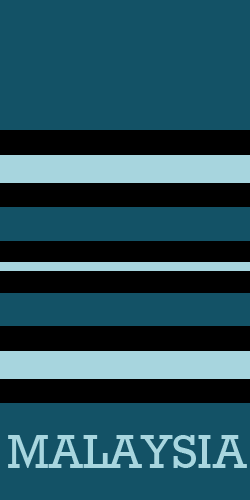
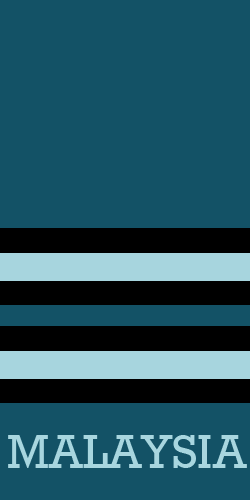
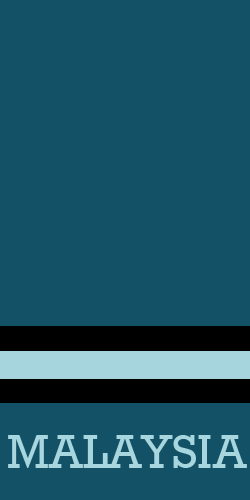
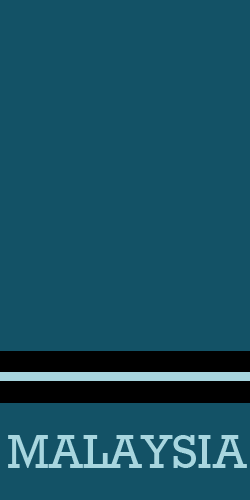
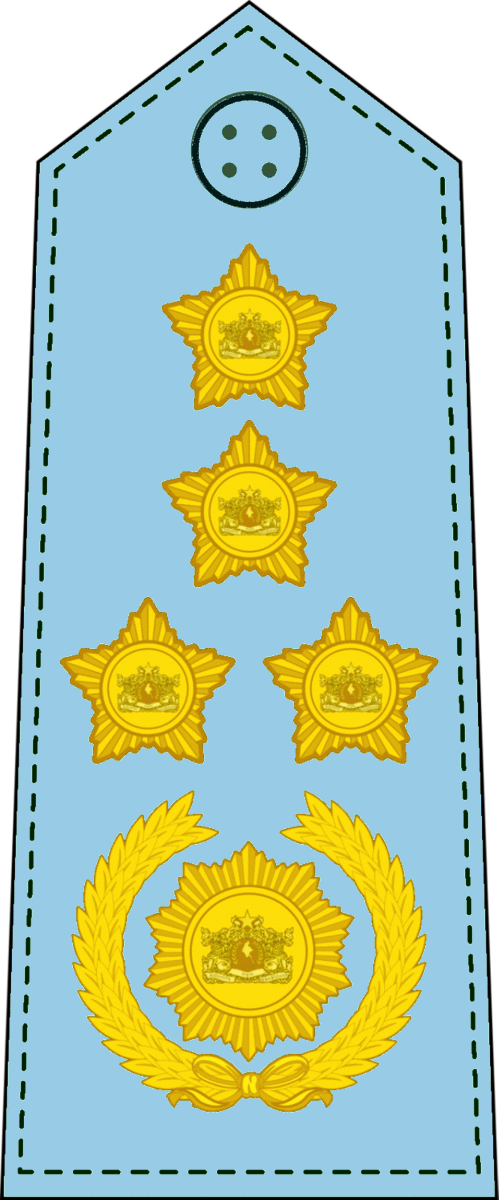
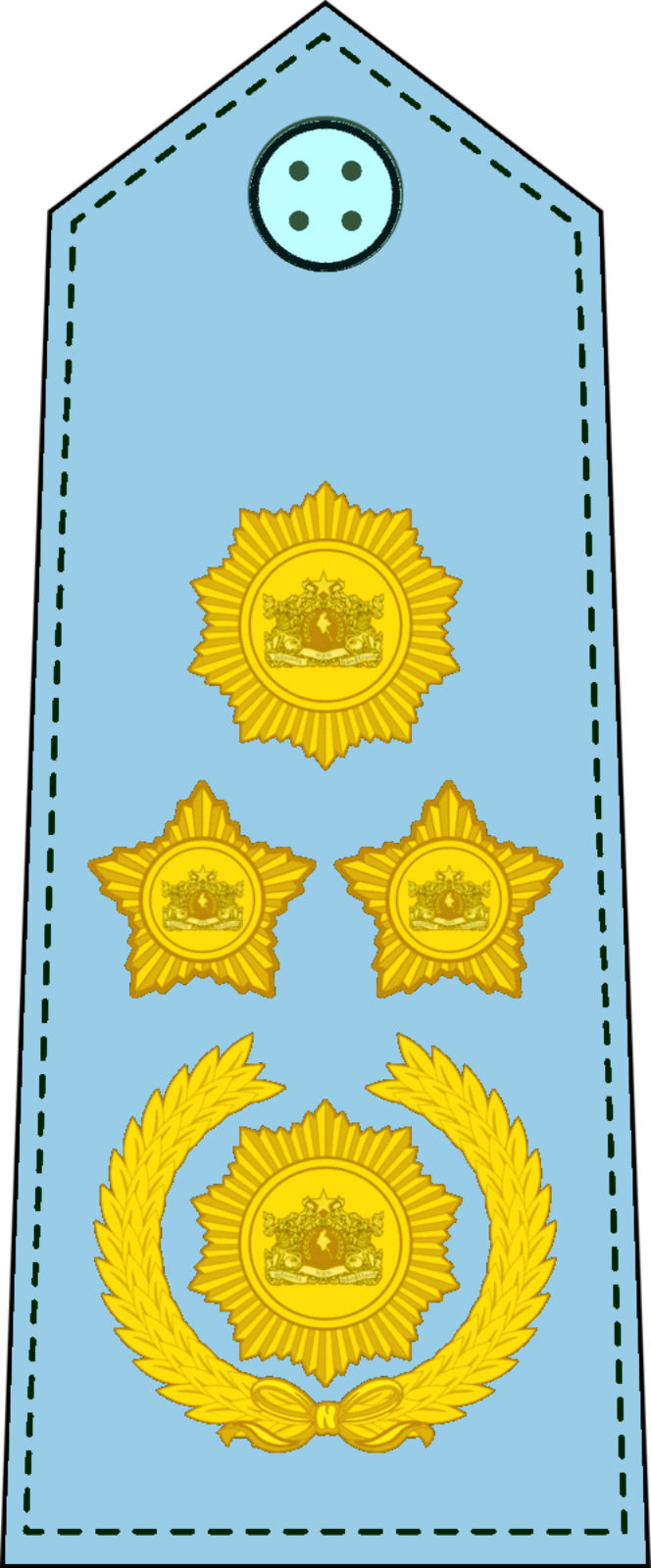
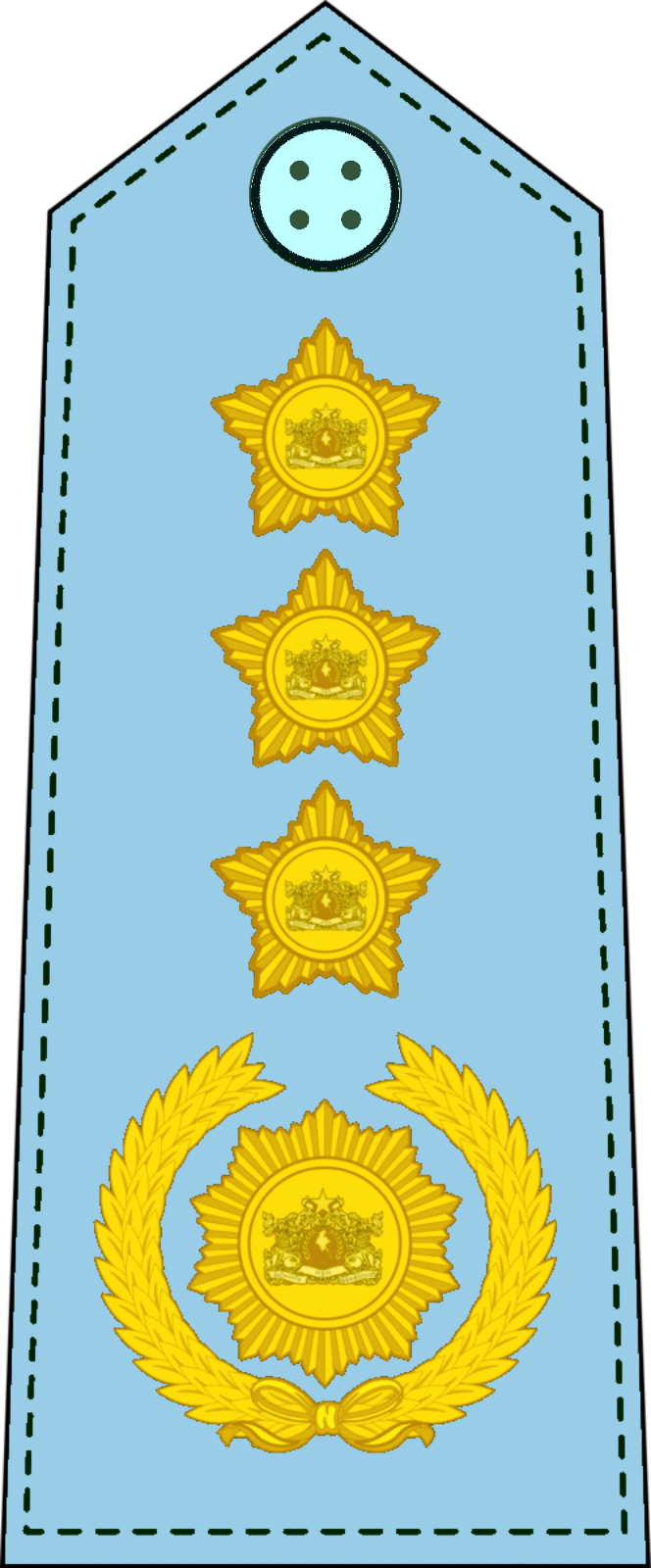
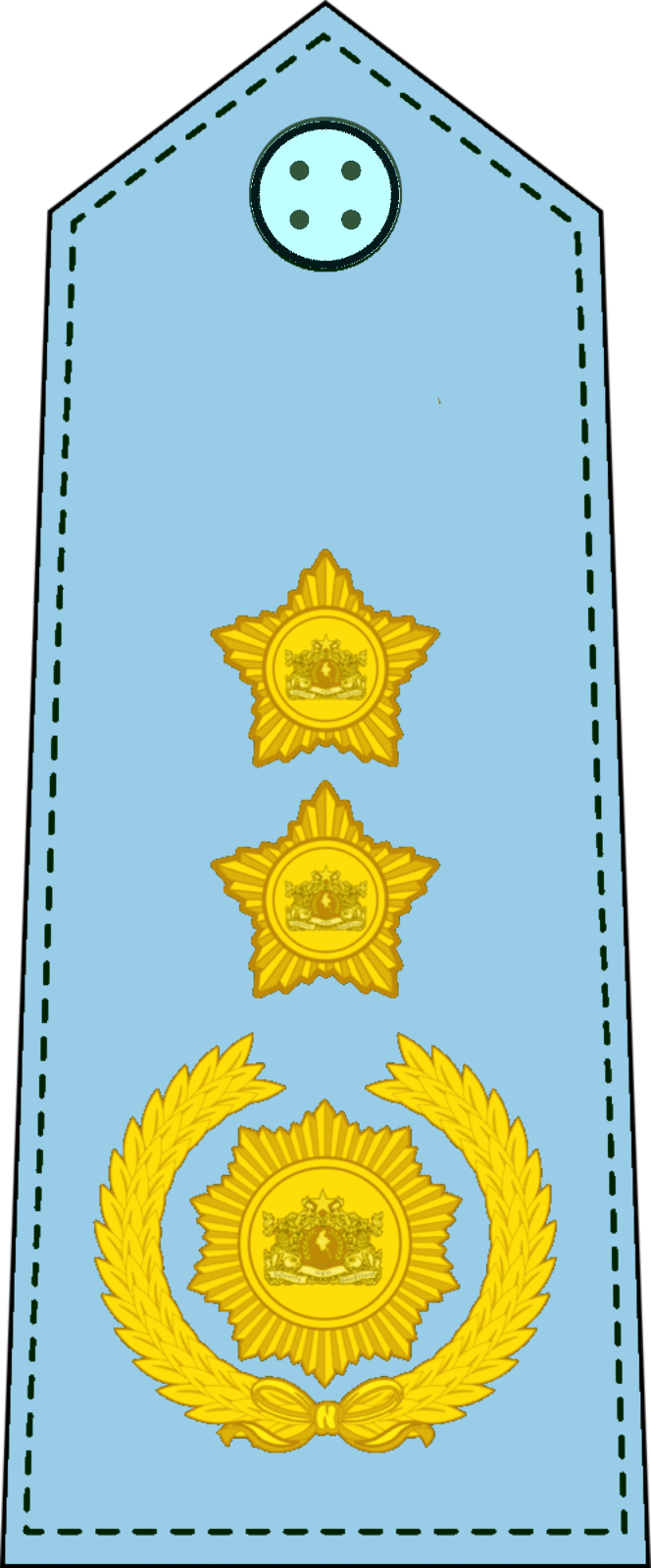
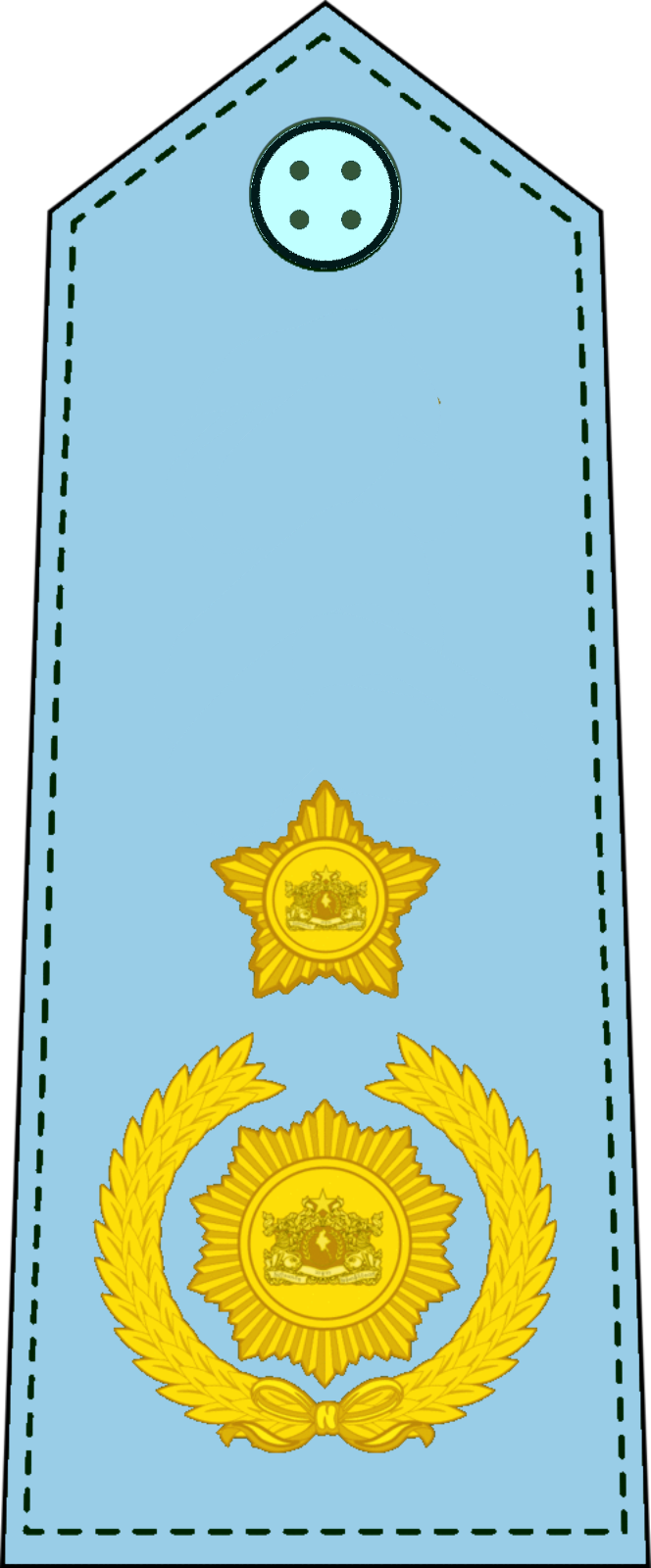
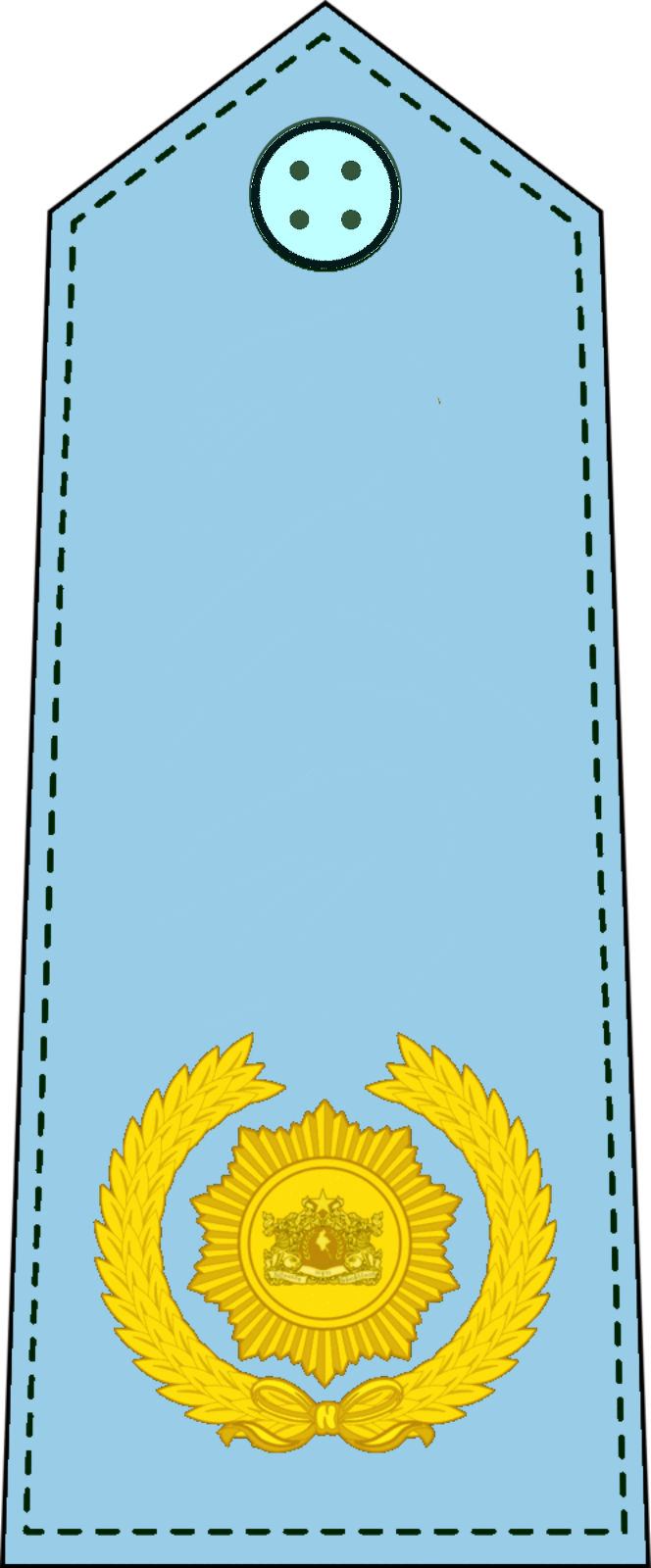
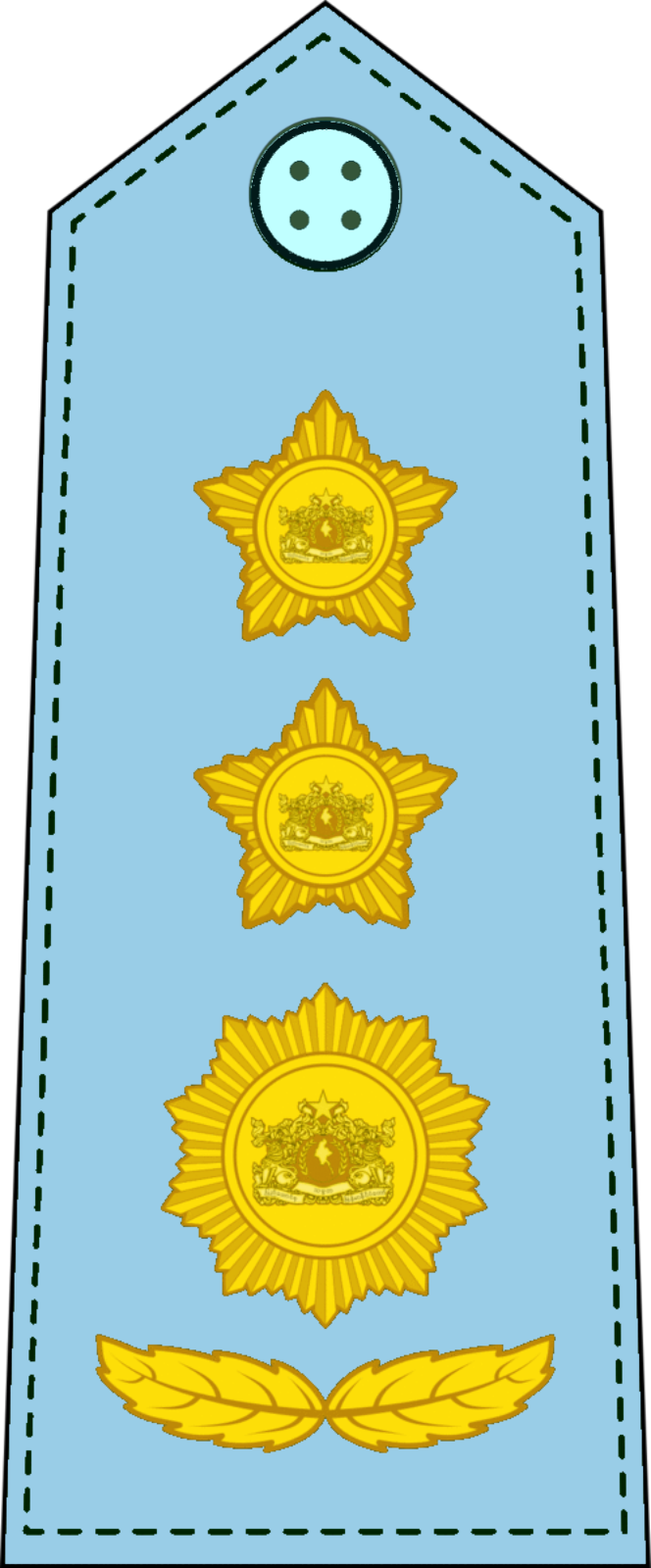
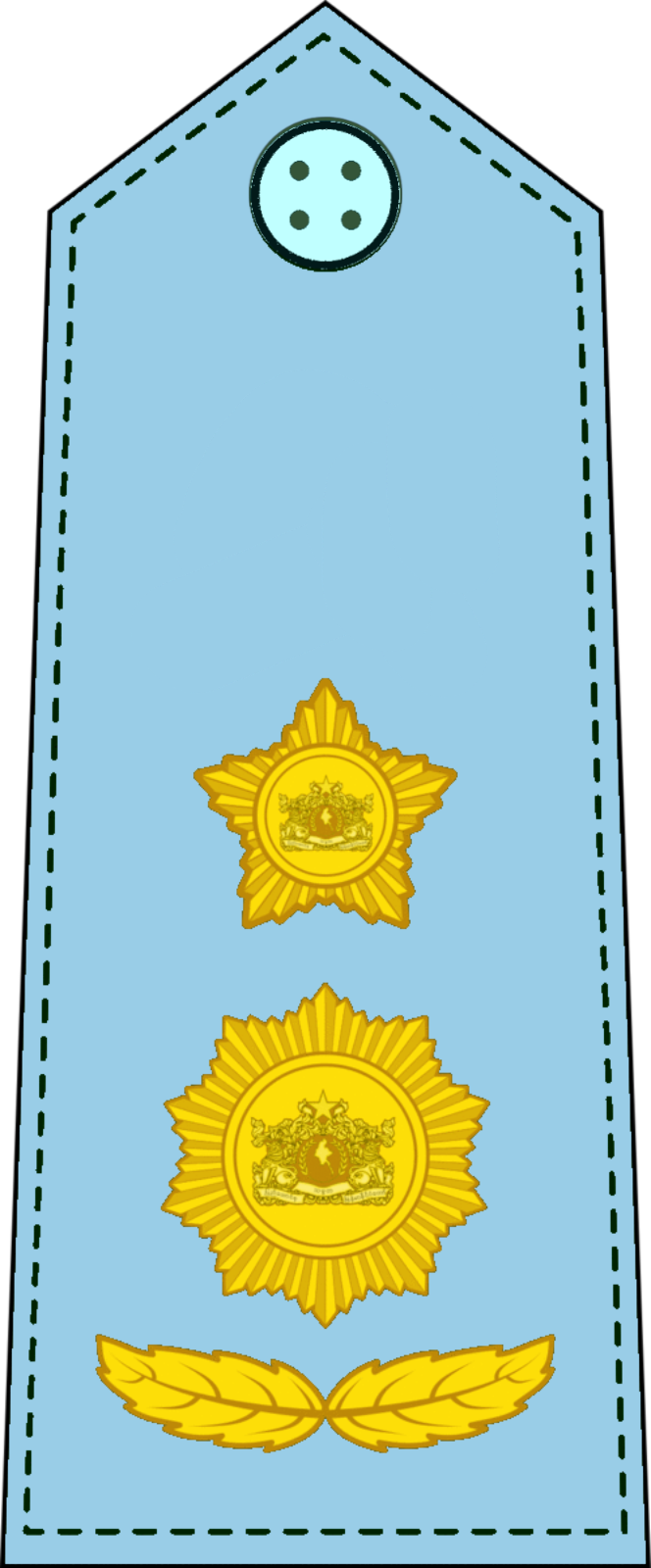
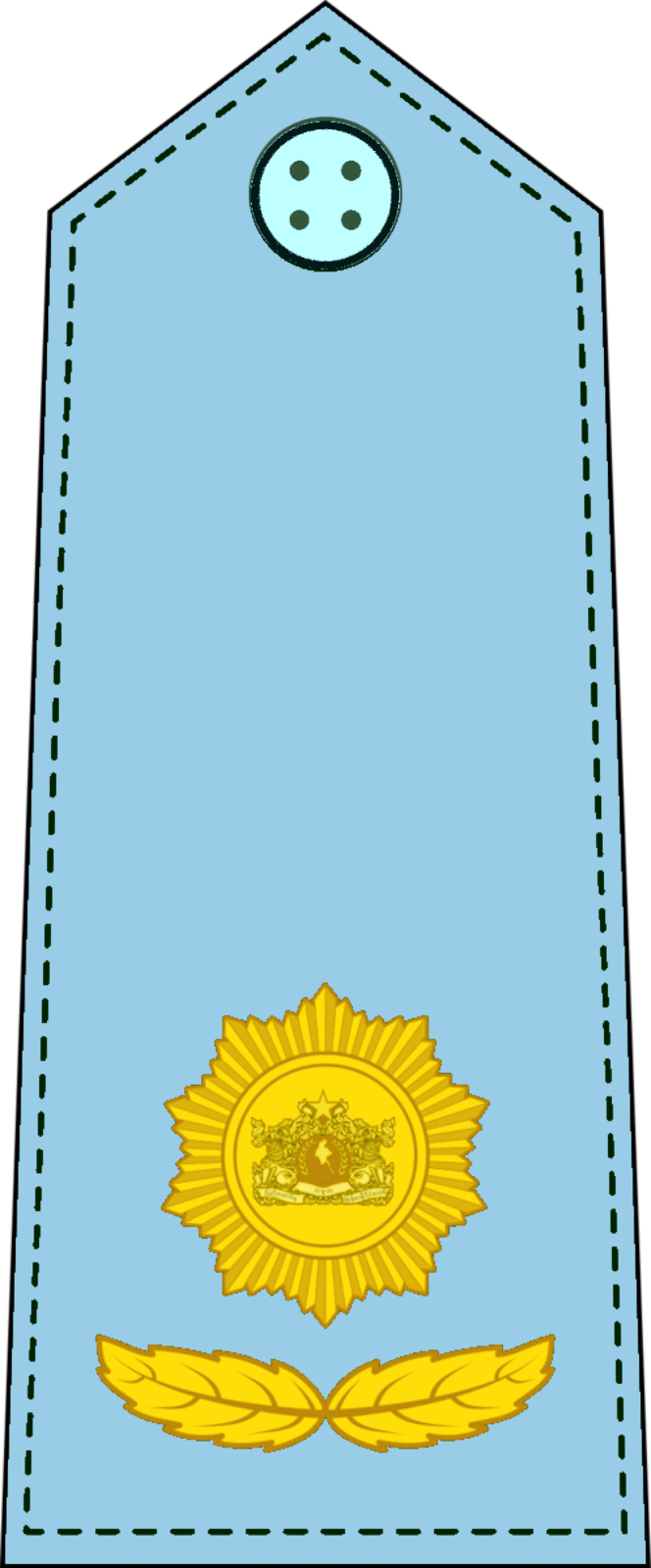
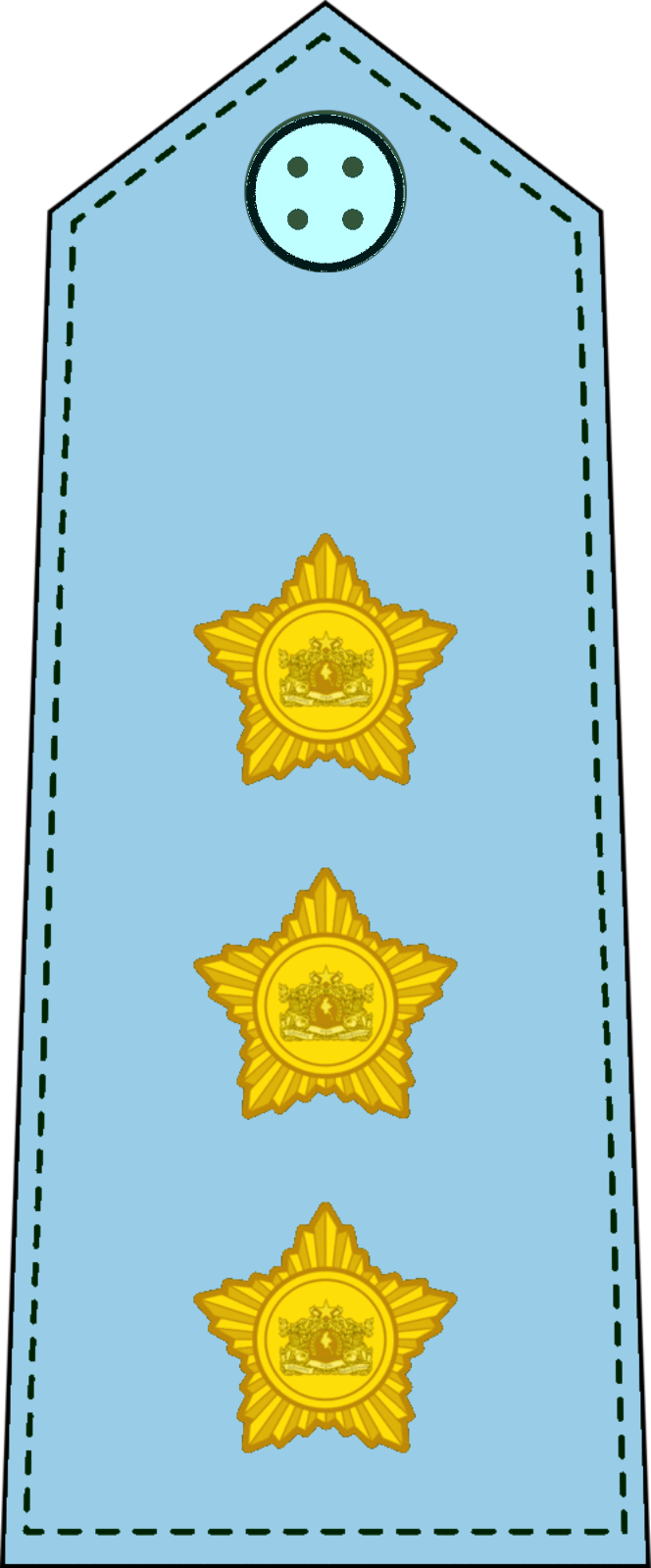
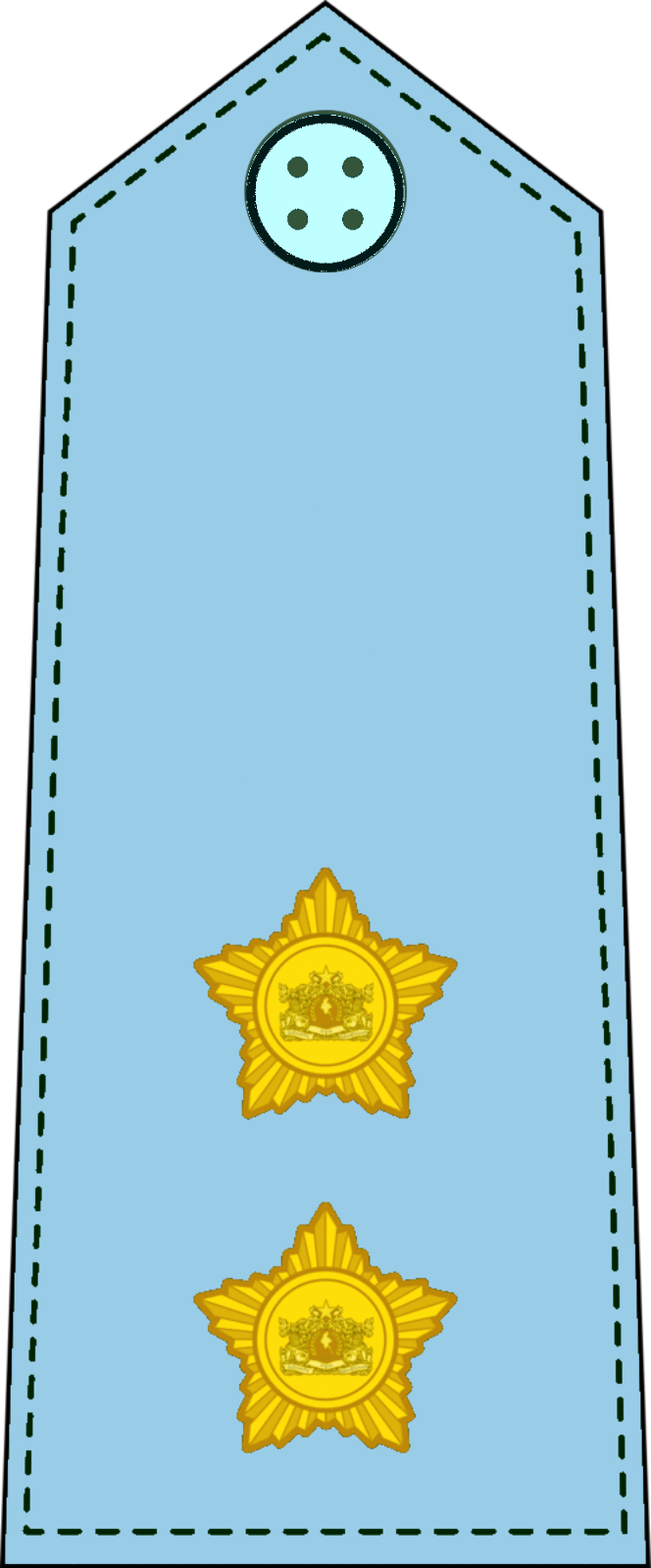
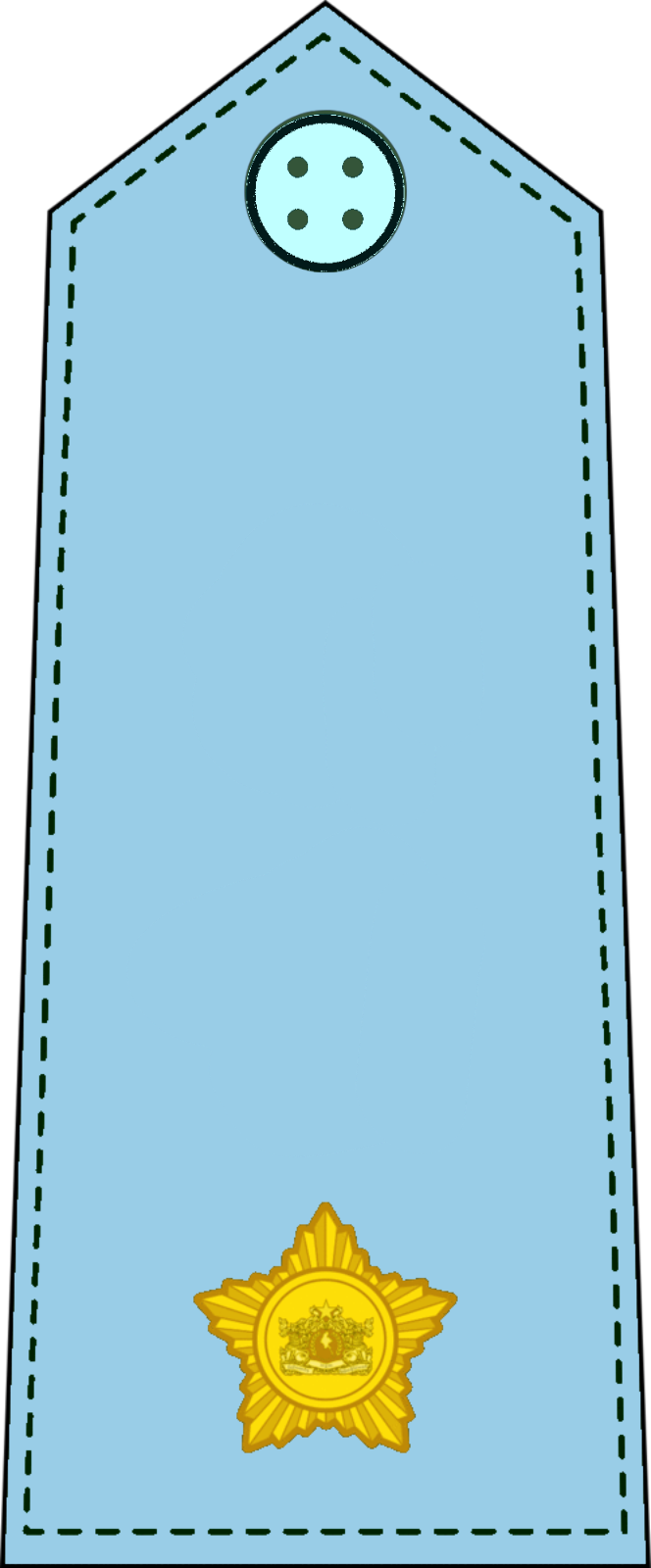
Rank group	General / flag officers								Senior officers					Junior officers
Islamic Emirate of Afghanistan	No rank structure
Armenian Air Force
Armenian Air Force			Բանակի գեներալ Banaki general		գեներալ-գնդապետ General-gndapet	գեներալ-լեյտենանտ General-leytenant	գեներալ-մայոր General-mayor		գնդապետ Gndapet		փոխգնդապետ P’vokhgndapet		մայոր Mayor	կապիտան Kapitan	ավագ լեյտենանտ Avag leytenant		լեյտենանտ Leytenant
Azerbaijani Air Force
Azerbaijani Air Force					General-polkovnik	General-leytenant	General-mayor		Polkovnik		Polkovnik-leytenant		Mayor	Kapitan	Baş leytenant	Leytenant	Kiçik leytenant
Royal Bahraini Air Force
Royal Bahraini Air Force	مشیر; Mushir		فريق أول; Fariq 'awal		فريق; Fariq	لواء; Liwa	عميد; Amid		عقيد; Aqid		مقدم; Muqaddam		رائد; Ra'id	نقيب; Naqib	ملازم أول; Mulazim awwal		ملازم; Mulazim
Bangladesh Air Force
Bangladesh Air Force			এয়ার চিফ মার্শাল; Ēẏār chiph mārśāl		এয়ার মার্শাল; Ēẏār mārśāl	এয়ার ভাইস মার্শাল; Ēẏār bhā'is mārśāl	এয়ার কমোডোর; Ēẏār kômōḍōr		গ্রুপ ক্যাপ্টেন; Grup kaepṭēn		উইং কমান্ডার; U'iṁ kômānḍār		স্কোয়াড্রন লীডার; Skōẏāḍran līḍār	ফ্লাইট লেফটেন্যান্ট; Phlā'iṭ lēphṭēnānṭ	ফ্লাইং অফিসার; Phlā'iṁ ôphisār		পাইলট অফিসার; Pā'ilôṭ Ôphisār
Bhutan	No air force
Royal Brunei Air Force
Royal Brunei Air Force	Marsyal udara		Jeneral (udara)		Leftenan jeneral (udara)	Mejar jeneral (udara)	Brigedier jeneral (udara)		Kolonel (udara)		Leftenan kolonel (udara)		Mejar (udara)	Kapten (udara)	Leftenan (udara)		Leftenan muda (udara)
Royal Cambodian Air Force
Royal Cambodian Air Force			នាយឧត្ដមសេនីយ៍ Neay utdamsenei		ឧត្ដមសេនីយ៍ឯក; Utdamsenei ek	ឧត្តមសេនីយ៍ទោ Utdamsenei tou	ឧត្តមសេនីយ៍ត្រី Utdamsenei trei		វរសេនីយ៍ឯក; Veareasenei ek		វរសេនីយ៍ទោ Veareasenei tou		វរសេនីយ៍ត្រី Veareasenei trei	អនុសេនីយ៍ឯក; Anusenei ek	អនុសេនីយ៍ទោ Anusenei tou		អនុសេនីយ៍ត្រី Anusenei trei
PLA Air Force
PLA Air Force			空军上将; Kōngjūn shàngjiàng		空军中将; Kōngjūn zhōngjiàng	空军少将; Kōngjūn shàojiàng			空军大校; Kōngjūn dàxiào	空军上校; Kōngjūn shàngxiào	空军中校; Kōngjūn zhōngxiào		空军少校; Kōngjūn shàoxiào	空军上尉; Kōngjūn shàngwèi	空军中尉; Kōngjūn zhōngwèi		空军少尉; Kōngjūn shàowèi
Republic of China Air Force
Republic of China Air Force			一級上將; It-kip siōng-chiòng	二級上將; Jī-kip siōng-chiòng	中將; Tiong-chiòng	少將; Siáu-chiòng			上校; Siōng-hāu		中校; Tiong-hāu		少校; Siáu-hāu	上尉; Siōng-ùi	中尉; Tiong-ùi		少尉; Siáu-ùi
Indian Air Force
Indian Air Force	Marshal of the Indian Air Force मार्शल ऑफ द इंडियन एयरफोर्स		Air chief marshal एयर चीफ मार्शल		Air marshal एयर मार्शल	Air vice marshal एयर वाइस मार्शल	Air commodore एयर कमोडोर		Group captain ग्रुप कैप्टन		Wing commander विंग कमांडर		Squadron leader स्क्वाड्रन लीडर	Flight lieutenant फ्लाइट लैफ्टिनेंट	Flying officer फ्लाइंग अफसर
Rank group	General / flag officers								Senior officers					Junior officers
Indonesian Air Force
Indonesian Air Force	Marsekal besar		Marsekal		Marsekal madya	Marsekal muda	Marsekal pertama		Kolonel		Letnan kolonel		Mayor	Kapten	Letnan satu		Letnan dua
Iranian Air Force
Iranian Air Force			ارتشبد; Arteshbod		سپهبد; Sepahbod	سرلشکر; Sarlashkar	سرتیپ; Sartip	سرتیپ دوم; Sartip dovom	سرهنگ; Sarhang		سرهنگ دوم; Sarhang dovom		سرگرد; Sargord	سروان; Sarvān	ستوان یکم; Sotvān yekom	ستوان دوم; Sotvān dovom	ستوان سوم; Sotvān sevom
Iraqi Air Force
Iraqi Air Force	مشیر; Mushir		فريق أول; Fariq 'awal		فريق; Fariq	لواء; Liwa	عميد; Amid		عقيد; Aqid		مقدم; Muqaddam		رائد; Ra'id	نقيب; Naqib	ملازم أول; Mulazim awwal		ملازم; Mulazim
Israeli Air Force
Israeli Air Force					רב-אלוף; Rav aluf	אלוף; Aluf	תת-אלוף; Tat aluf		אלוף משנה; Aluf mishne		סגן-אלוף; Sgan aluf		רב סרן; Rav seren	סרן; Seren	סגן; Segen		סגן-משנה; Segen mishne
Japan Air Self-Defense Force
Japan Air Self-Defense Force			幕僚長および統合作戦司令官たる空将; Bakuryōchō-oyobi-Tōgōsakusenshireikan-taru-kūshō		空将; Kūshō	空将補; Kūshō-ho			1等空佐; Ittō kūsa		2等空佐; Nitō kūsa		3等空佐; Santō kūsa	1等空尉; Ittō kūi	2等空尉; Nitō kūi	3等空尉; Santō kūi	准空尉; Jun kūi
Royal Jordanian Air Force
Royal Jordanian Air Force	مشیر; Mushir		فريق أول; Fariq 'awal		فريق; Fariq	لواء; Liwa	عميد; Amid		عقيد; Aqid		مقدم; Muqaddam		رائد; Ra'id	نقيب; Naqib	ملازم أول; Mulazim awwal		ملازم; Mulazim
Kazakh Air Defense Forces
Kazakh Air Defense Forces	Жоғарғы Бас қолбасшының Joğarğı Bas qolbasşınıñ				Генерал-полковник; General-polkovnïk	Генерал-лейтенант; General-leytenant	Генерал-майор; General-mayor		Полковник; Polkovnïk		Подполковник; Podpolkovnïk		Майор; Mayor	Капитан; Kapïtan	Аға лейтенант Ağa leytenant		Лейтенант; Leytenant
Korean People's Army Air Force
Korean People's Army Air Force	인민군원수; Inmingun-wonsu	차수; Chasu	대장; Daejang		상장; Sangjang	중장; Chungjang	소장; Sojang		대좌; Daechwa	상좌; Sangjwa	중좌; Chungjwa		소좌; Sojwa	대위; Taewi	상위; Sangwi	중위; Chungwi	소위; Sowi
Republic of Korea Air Force
Republic of Korea Air Force	원수; Wonsu		대장; Daejang		중장; Jungjang	소장; Sojang	준장; Junjang		대령; Daeryeong		중령; Jungnyeong		소령; Soryeong	대위; Daewi	중위; Jungwi		소위; Sowi
Kuwait Air Force
Kuwait Air Force			فريق أول; Fariq 'awal		فريق; Fariq	لواء; Liwa	عميد; Amid		عقيد; Aqid		مقدم; Muqaddam		رائد; Ra'id	نقيب; Naqib	ملازم أول; Mulazim awwal		ملازم; Mulazim
Kyrgyz Air Force
Kyrgyz Air Force							Генерал-майор; General-mayor		Полковник; Polkovnik		Подполковник; Podpolkovnik		Майор; Mayor	Капитан; Kapitan	Улук лейтенант Uluk leytenant	Лейтенант; Leytenant	Кенже лейтенант Kenje leytenant
Rank group	General / flag officers								Senior officers					Junior officers
Lao People's Liberation Air Force
Lao People's Liberation Air Force			ພົນເອກ; Phonoek		ພົນໂທ; Phonoth	ພົນຕີ Phon ti	ພົນຈັດຕະວາ; Phonchadtauaa		ພັນເອກ; Phanoek		ພັນໂທ; Phanoth		ພັນຕີ Phan ti	ຮ້ອຍເອກ; Honyoek	ຮ້ອຍໂທ; Hony oth		ຮ້ອຍຕີ Hony ti
Lebanese Air Force
Lebanese Air Force					عماد; Eimad	لواء; Liwa	عميد; Amid		عقيد; Aqid		مقدم; Muqaddam		رائد; Ra'id	نقيب; Naqib	ملازم أول; Mulazim awwal		ملازم; Mulazim
Royal Malaysian Air Force
Royal Malaysian Air Force	Marsyal tentera udara		Jeneral TUDM		Leftenan jeneral TUDM	Mejar jeneral TUDM	Brigedier jeneral TUDM		Kolonel TUDM		Leftenan kolonel TUDM		Mejar TUDM	Kapten TUDM	Leftenan TUDM		Leftenan muda TUDM
Maldives Air Corps
Maldives Air Corps							ބްރިގޭޑިއަރ ޖެނެރަލް Brigeydiar jeneral		ކާނަލް Kaanal		ލެފްޓިނަންޓް ކާނަލް Leftinant kaanal		މޭޖަރ; Meyjar	ކެޕްޓަން Keptan	ފަސްޓް ލެފްޓިނަންޓް Fast leftinant		ލެފްޓިނަންޓް Leftinant
Mongolian Air Force
Mongolian Air Force			Генерал; Gyenyeral		Дэслэгч генерал Deslegch gyenyeral	Хошууч генерал Khoshuuch gyenyeral	Бригадын генерал Brigadyn gyenyeral		Хурандаа; Khurandaa		Дэд хурандаа Ded khurandaa		Хошууч; Khoshuuch	Ахмад; Akhmad	Ахлах дэслэгч Akhmad deslegch		Дэслэгч; Deslegch
Myanmar Air Force
Myanmar Air Force	ဗိုလ်ချုပ်မှူးကြီး bauilaʻ khayupaʻ mahūʺkarīʺ		ဒုတိယ ဗိုလ်ချုပ်မှူးကြီး dautaiya bauilaʻ khayupaʻ mahūʺkarīʺ	ဗိုလ်ချုပ်ကြီး bauilaʻ khayupaʻ karīʺ	ဒုတိယ ဗိုလ်ချုပ်ကြီး dautaiya bauilaʻ khayupaʻ karīʺ	ဗိုလ်ချုပ် bauilaʻ khayupaʻ	ဗိုလ်မှူးချုပ် bauilaʻ mahūʺkhayupaʻ		ဗိုလ်မှူးကြီး bauilaʻ mahūʺkrīʺ		ဒုတိယ ဗိုလ်မှူးကြီး dautaiya bauilaʻ mahūʺ krīʺ		ဗိုလ်မှူး bauilaʻ mahūʺ	ဗိုလ်ကြီး bauilaʻ krīʺ	ဗိုလ် bauilaʻ		ဒုတိယ ဗိုလ် dautaiya bauilaʻ
Nepalese Army Air Service
Nepalese Army Air Service							सहायक रथी Sahaayak rathee		महासेनानी Mahāsēnānī		प्रमुख सेनानी Pramukh senaanee		सेनानी Senaanee	सहसेनानी Sahasēnānī	उपसेनानी Upasēnānī		सहायक सेनानी Sahaayak senaanee
Nepalese Army Air Service							Brigadier general		Colonel		Lieutenant colonel		Major	Captain	Lieutenant		Second lieutenant
Royal Air Force of Oman
Royal Air Force of Oman	مشیر; Mushir		فريق أول; Fariq 'awal		فريق; Fariq	لواء; Liwa	عميد; Amid		عقيد; Aqid		مقدم; Muqaddam		رائد; Ra'id	نقيب; Naqib	ملازم أول; Mulazim awwal		ملازم; Mulazim
Pakistan Air Force
Pakistan Air Force	Marshal of the Pakistan Air Force		Air chief marshal		Air marshal	Air vice marshal	Air commodore		Group captain		Wing commander		Squadron leader	Flight lieutenant	Flying officer		Pilot officer
Pakistan Air Force	سالار فضائیہ		امیرسالار فضائیہ		سالار فضائیہ	سالار فضائیہ مقابل	عَمِيد الفضاء		سردار جماعت		شارف الجناح		قائدِ دستہ	نقیبِ پرواز	منصبِ طیار		منصبِ پائلٹ
Philippine Air Force
Philippine Air Force			General		Lieutenant general	Major general	Brigadier general		Colonel		Lieutenant colonel		Major	Captain	First lieutenant		Second lieutenant
Qatar Emiri Air Force
Qatar Emiri Air Force			فريق أول; Fariq 'awal		فريق; Fariq	لواء; Liwa	عميد; Amid		عقيد; Aqid		مقدم; Muqaddam		رائد; Ra'id	نقيب; Naqib	ملازم أول; Mulazim awwal		ملازم; Mulazim
Russian Aerospace Forces
Russian Aerospace Forces			Генера́л а́рмии Generál ármii		Генера́л-полко́вник; Generál-polkóvnik	Генера́л-лейтена́нт; Generál-leytenánt	Генера́л-майо́р; Generál-mayór		Полко́вник; Polkóvnik		Подполко́вник; Podpolkóvnik		Майо́р; Majór	Kапита́н; Kapitán	Старший лейтена́нт Stárshiy leytenánt	Лейтенант; Leytenant	Mла́дший лейтена́нт Mládshiy leytenánt
Rank group	General / flag officers								Senior officers					Junior officers
Royal Saudi Air Force
Royal Saudi Air Force			فريق أول; Fariq 'awal		فريق; Fariq	لواء; Liwa	عميد; Amid		عقيد; Aqid		مقدم; Muqaddam		رائد; Ra'id	نقيب; Naqib	ملازم أول; Mulazim awwal		ملازم; Mulazim
Republic of Singapore Air Force			No insignia yet
Republic of Singapore Air Force			General		Lieutenant general	Major general	Brigadier general		Colonel		Senior lieutenant colonel	Lieutenant colonel	Major	Captain	Lieutenant		Second lieutenant
Sri Lanka Air Force
Sri Lanka Air Force	Marshal of the Air Force		Air chief marshal		Air marshal	Air vice-marshal	Air commodore		Group captain		Wing commander		Squadron leader	Flight lieutenant	Flying officer		Pilot officer
Syrian Air Force
Syrian Air Force	فريق; Fariq		عماد أول; Eimad 'awal		عماد; Eimad	لواء; Alliwa'	عميد; Amid		عقيد; Aqid		مقدم; Muqaddam		رائد; Ra'id	نقيب; Naqib	ملازم أول; Mulazim awwal		ملازم; Mulazim
Tajik Air Force
Tajik Air Force					Генерал-полковник; General-polkovnik	Генерал-лейтенант; General-leytenant	Генерал-майор; General-mayor		Полковник; Polkovnik		Подполковник; Podpolkovnik		Майор; Mayor	Капитан; Kapitan	Лейтенанти калон Leytenanti kalon	Лейтенант; Leytenant	Лейтенанти хурд Leytenanti xurd
Royal Thai Air Force
Royal Thai Air Force	จอมพลอากาศ; Chom phon akat		พลอากาศเอก; Phon akat ek		พลอากาศโท; Phon akat tho	พลอากาศตรี Phon akat tri			นาวาอากาศเอก; Nawa akat ek		นาวาอากาศโท; Nawa akat tho		นาวาอากาศตรี Nawa akat tri	เรืออากาศเอก; Ruea akat ek	เรืออากาศโท; Ruea akat tho		เรืออากาศตรี Ruea akat tri
Timor-Leste	No air force
Turkmen Air Force
Turkmen Air Force					General-polkownik	General-leýtenant	General-maýor		Polkownik		Podpolkownik		Maýor	Kapitan	Uly leýtenant	Leýtenant	Kiçi leýtenant
United Arab Emirates Air Force
United Arab Emirates Air Force			فريق أول; Fariq 'awal		فريق; Fariq	لواء; Liwa	عميد; Amid		عقيد; Aqid		مقدم; Muqaddam		رائد; Ra'id	نقيب; Naqib	ملازم أول; Mulazim awwal		ملازم; Mulazim
Uzbekistan Air and Air Defence Forces
Uzbekistan Air and Air Defence Forces					General-polkovnik	General-leytenant	General-mayor		Polkovnik		Podpolkovnik		Mayor	Kapitan	Katta leytenant		Leytenant
Vietnam People's Air Force
Vietnam People's Air Force					Thượng tướng	Trung tướng	Thiếu tướng		Đại tá	Thượng tá	Trung tá		Thiếu tá	Đại úy	Thượng úy	Trung úy	Thiếu úy
Yemeni Air Force
Yemeni Air Force	مشیر; Mushir		فريق أول; Fariq 'awal		فريق; Fariq	لواء; Liwa	عميد; Amid		عقيد; Aqid		مقدم; Muqaddam		رائد; Ra'id	نقيب; Naqib	ملازم أول; Mulazim awwal		ملازم ثان; Mulazim than
Rank group	General / flag officers								Senior officers					Junior officers

== See also ==
- Air force officer rank insignia
