= Comparative air force officer ranks of the European Union =

Rank comparison chart of all air forces of the European Union member states.

== Officers (OF 1–10) ==
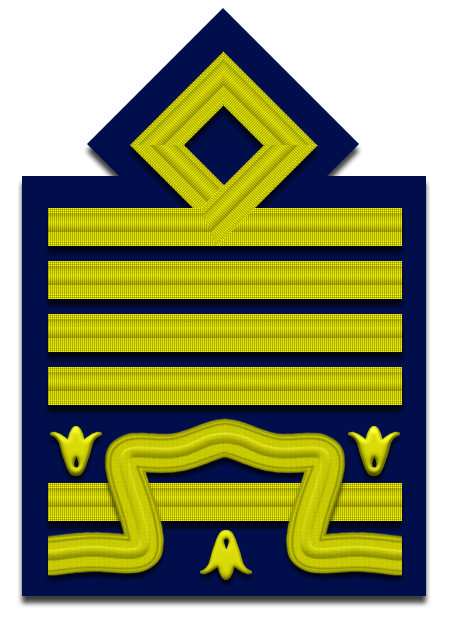
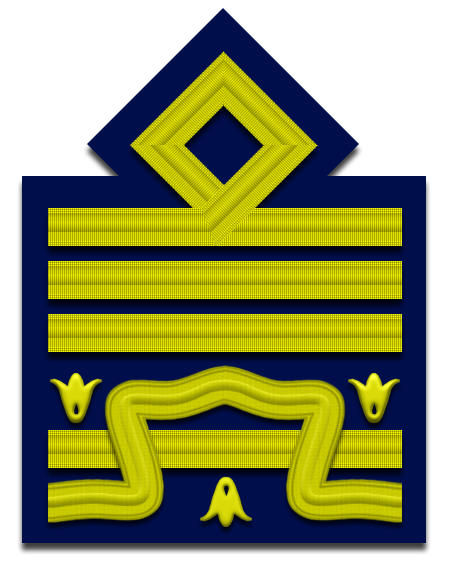
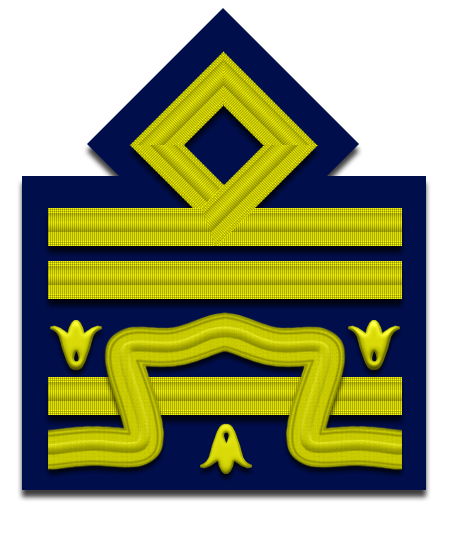
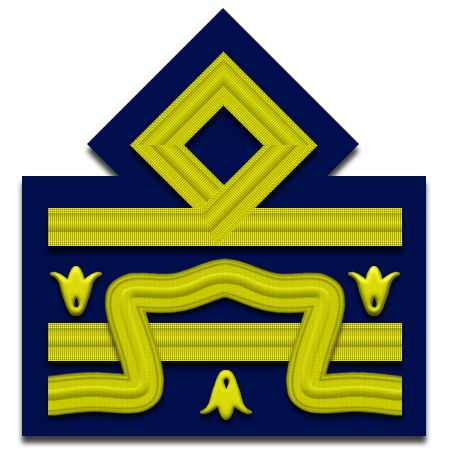
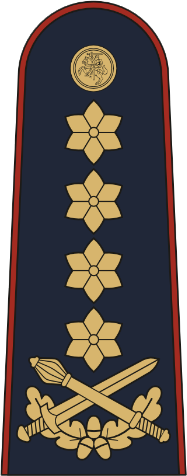
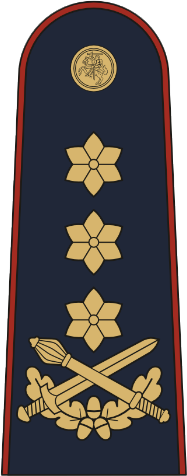
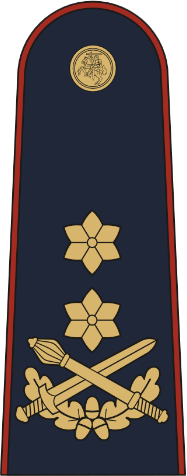
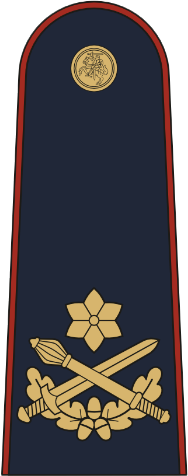
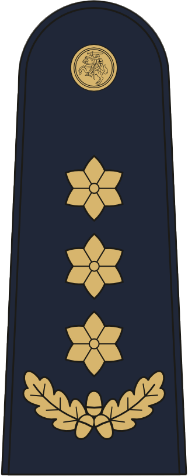
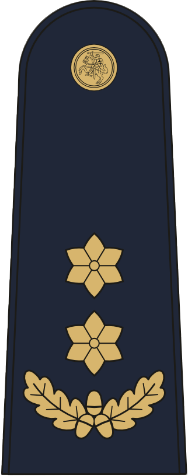
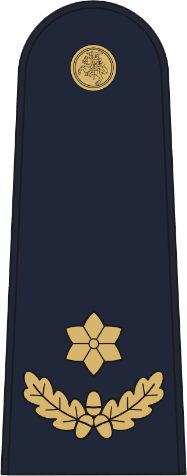
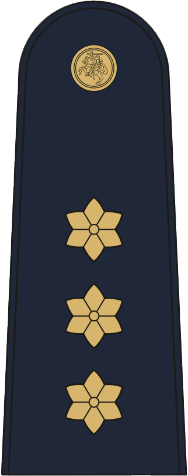
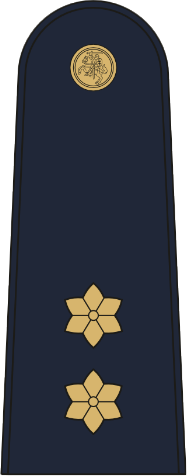
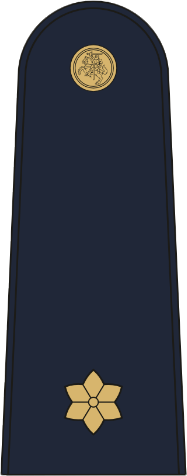
Rank group	General / flag officers					Senior officers				Junior officers
Belgian Air Component
Belgian Air Component		Generaal	Luitenant-generaal	Generaal-majoor	Brigadegeneraal	Kolonel	Luitenant-kolonel	Majoor	Kapitein-commandant	Kapitein		Luitenant		Onderluitenant
Belgian Air Component		Général	Lieutenant général	Général-major	Général de Brigade	Colonel	Lieutenant-colonel	Major	Capitaine-commandant	Capitaine		Lieutenant		Sous-lieutenant
Belgian Air Component		General	Generalleutnant	Generalmajor	Brigadegeneral	Oberst	Oberstleutnant	Major	Stabshauptmann	Hauptmann		Leutnant		Unterleutnant
Bulgarian Air Force
Bulgarian Air Force		Генерал; General	Генерал-лейтенант; General-leytenant	Генерал-майор; General-mayor	Бригаден генерал Brigaden general	Полковник; Polkovnik	Подполковник; Podpolkovnik	Майор; Mayor		Капитан; Kapitan		Старши лейтенант Starshi leytenant		Лейтенант; Leytenant
Croatian Air Force
Croatian Air Force	Stožerni general	General zbora	General pukovnik	General bojnik	Brigadni general	Brigadir	Pukovnik	Bojnik		Satnik		Natporučnik		Poručnik
Cyprus Air Forces
Cyprus Air Forces			Αντιπτέραρχος; Antipterarchos	Υποπτέραρχος; Ypopterarchos	Ταξίαρχος; Taxiarchos	Σμήναρχος; Sminarchos	Αντισμήναρχος; Antisminarchos	Επισμηναγός; Episminagos		Σμηναγός; Sminagos		Υποσμηναγός; Yposminagos	Ανθυποσμηναγός; Anthyposminagos
Czech Air Force
Czech Air Force		Armádní generál	Generálporučík	Generálmajor	Brigádní generál	Plukovník	Podplukovník	Major		Kapitán		Nadporučík		Poručík
Royal Danish Air Force
Royal Danish Air Force		General	Generalløjtnant	Generalmajor	Brigadegeneral	Oberst	Oberstløjtnant	Major		Kaptajn		Premierløjtnant	Løjtnant	Sekondløjtnant
Estonian Air Force
Estonian Air Force		Kindral	Kindralleitnant	Kindralmajor	Brigaadikindral	Kolonel	Kolonelleitnant	Major		Kapten		Leitnant	Nooremleitnant	Lipnik
Finnish Air Force
Finnish Air Force		Kenraali	Kenraaliluutnantti	Kenraalimajuri	Prikaatikenraali	Eversti	Everstiluutnantti	Majuri		Kapteeni		Yliluutnantti	Luutnantti	Vänrikki
Finnish Air Force		General	Generallöjtnant	Generalmajor	Brigadgeneral	Överste	Överstelöjtnant	Major		Kapten		Premiärlöjtnant	Löjtnant	Fänrik
Rank group	General / flag officers					Senior officers				Junior officers
French Air and Space Force
French Air and Space Force		Général d´armée aérienne	Général de corps aérien	Général de division aérienne	Général de brigade aérienne	Colonel	Lieutenant-colonel	Commandant		Capitaine		Lieutenant		Sous-lieutenant
German Air Force
German Air Force		General	Generalleutnant	Generalmajor	Brigadegeneral	Oberst	Oberstleutnant	Major		Stabshauptmann	Hauptmann	Oberleutnant		Leutnant
Hellenic Air Force
Hellenic Air Force		Πτέραρχος; Pterarchos	Αντιπτέραρχος; Antipterarchos	Υποπτέραρχος; Ypopterarchos	Ταξίαρχος; Taxiarchos	Σμήναρχος; Sminarchos	Αντισμήναρχος; Antisminarchos	Επισμηναγός; Episminagos		Σμηναγός; Sminagos		Υποσμηναγός; Yposminagos		Ανθυποσμηναγός; Anthyposminagos
Hungarian Air Force
Hungarian Air Force		Vezérezredes	Altábornagy	Vezérőrnagy	Dandártábornok	Ezredes	Alezredes	Őrnagy		Százados		Főhadnagy		Hadnagy
Irish Air Corps
Irish Air Corps			Lieutenant-general	Major-general	Brigadier-general	Colonel	Lieutenant-colonel	Commandant		Captain		Lieutenant		Second-lieutenant
Irish Air Corps			Lefteanant-ghinearál	Maor-ghinearál	Briogáidire-ghinearál	Cornal	Lefteanant-chornal	Ceannfort		Captaen		Lefteanant		Dara-lefteanant
Italian Air Force
Italian Air Force		Generale	Generale di squadra aerea	Generale di divisione aerea	Generale di brigata aerea	Colonnello	Tenente colonnello	Maggiore		Primo capitano	Capitano	Tenente		Sottotenente
Latvian Air Force
Latvian Air Force			Ģenerālleitnants	Ģenerālmajors	Brigādes ģenerālis	Pulkvedis	Pulkvežleitnants	Majors		Kapteinis		Virsleitnants		Leitnants
Lithuanian Air Force
Lithuanian Air Force		Generolas	Generolas leitenantas	Generolas majoras	Brigados generolas	Pulkininkas	Pulkininkas leitenantas	Majoras		Kapitonas		Vyresnysis leitenantas		Leitenantas
Luxembourg	No air force
Rank group	General / flag officers					Senior officers				Junior officers
Royal Netherlands Air Force
Royal Netherlands Air Force		Generaal	Luitenant-generaal	Generaal-majoor	Commodore	Kolonel	Luitenant-kolonel	Majoor		Kapitein		Eerste luitenant		Tweede luitenant
Polish Air Force
Polish Air Force	Marszałek Polski	Generał	Generał broni	Generał dywizji	Generał brygady	Pułkownik	Podpułkownik	Major		Kapitan		Porucznik		Podporucznik
Portuguese Air Force
Portuguese Air Force	Marechal da Força Aérea	General	Tenente-general	Major-general	Brigadeiro-general	Coronel	Tenente-coronel	Major		Capitão		Tenente		Alferes
Romanian Air Force
Romanian Air Force	Mareșal	General	General-locotenent	General-maior	General de flotilă aeriană	Comandor	Căpitan-comandor	Locotenent-comandor		Căpitan		Locotenent		Sublocotenent
(Slovakia) Slovak Air Force
(Slovakia) Slovak Air Force		Generál	Generálporučík (Note: The appropriate branch of service badge is pinned just under the top button of the for all ranks excluding full General.)	Generálmajor	Brigádny generál	Plukovník	Podplukovník	Major		Kapitán		Nadporučík		Poručík
(Slovenia) Slovenian Air Force and Air Defence
(Slovenia) Slovenian Air Force and Air Defence		General polkovnik	Generalpodpolkovnik	Generalmajor	Brigadni general	Polkovnik	Podpolkovnik	Major		Stotnik		Nadporočnik		Poročnik
Spanish Air and Space Force
Spanish Air and Space Force	Capitán general	General del aire	Teniente general	General de división	General de brigada	Coronel	Teniente coronel	Comandante		Capitán		Teniente		Alférez
Swedish Air Force
Swedish Air Force		General	Generallöjtnant	Generalmajor	Brigadgeneral	Överste	Överstelöjtnant	Major		Kapten		Löjtnant		Fänrik
Rank group	General / flag officers					Senior officers				Junior officers

== See also ==
- Comparative air force enlisted ranks of the European Union
- Military rank
- Comparative army officer ranks of the European Union
- Comparative army enlisted ranks of the European Union
- Comparative navy officer ranks of the European Union
- Comparative navy enlisted ranks of the European Union
- Ranks and insignia of NATO air forces officers
- Comparative air force officer ranks of Europe
