= Comparative army officer ranks of the European Union =

Rank comparison chart of all armies and land forces of the European Union member states.

== Officers (OF 1–10) ==
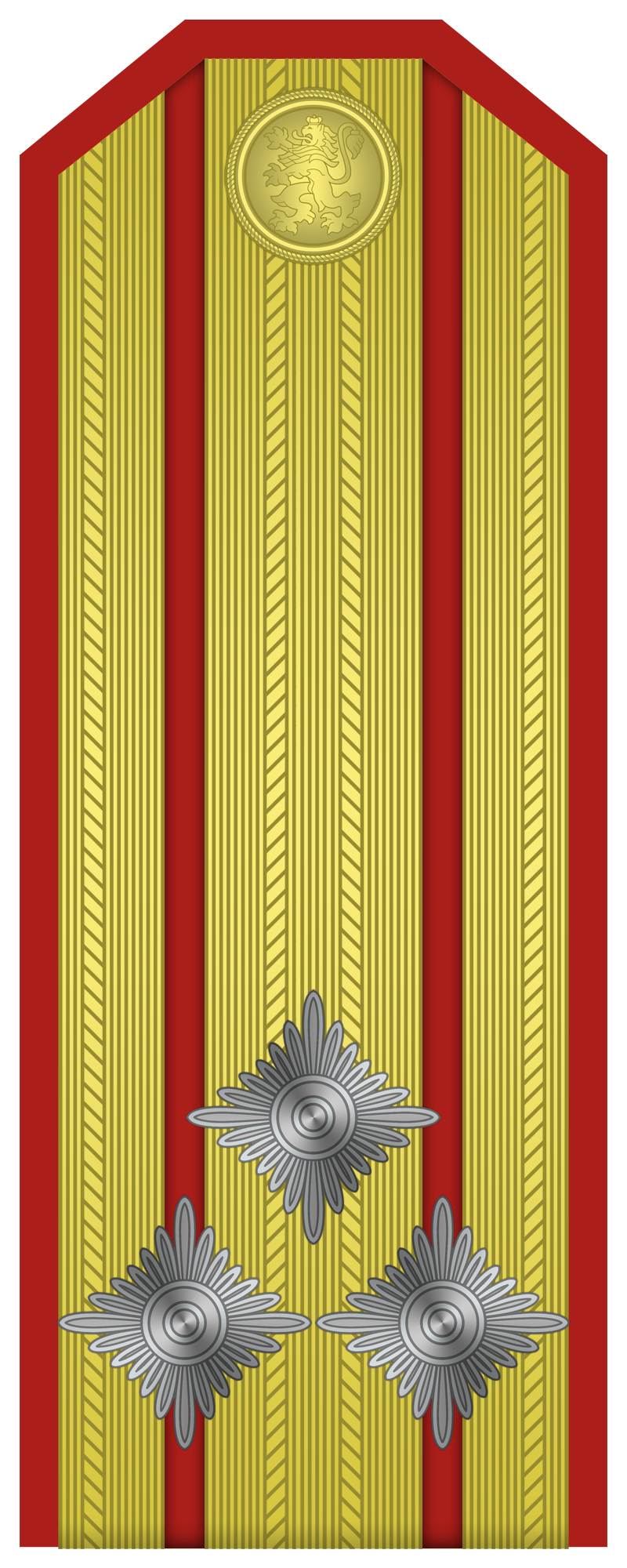
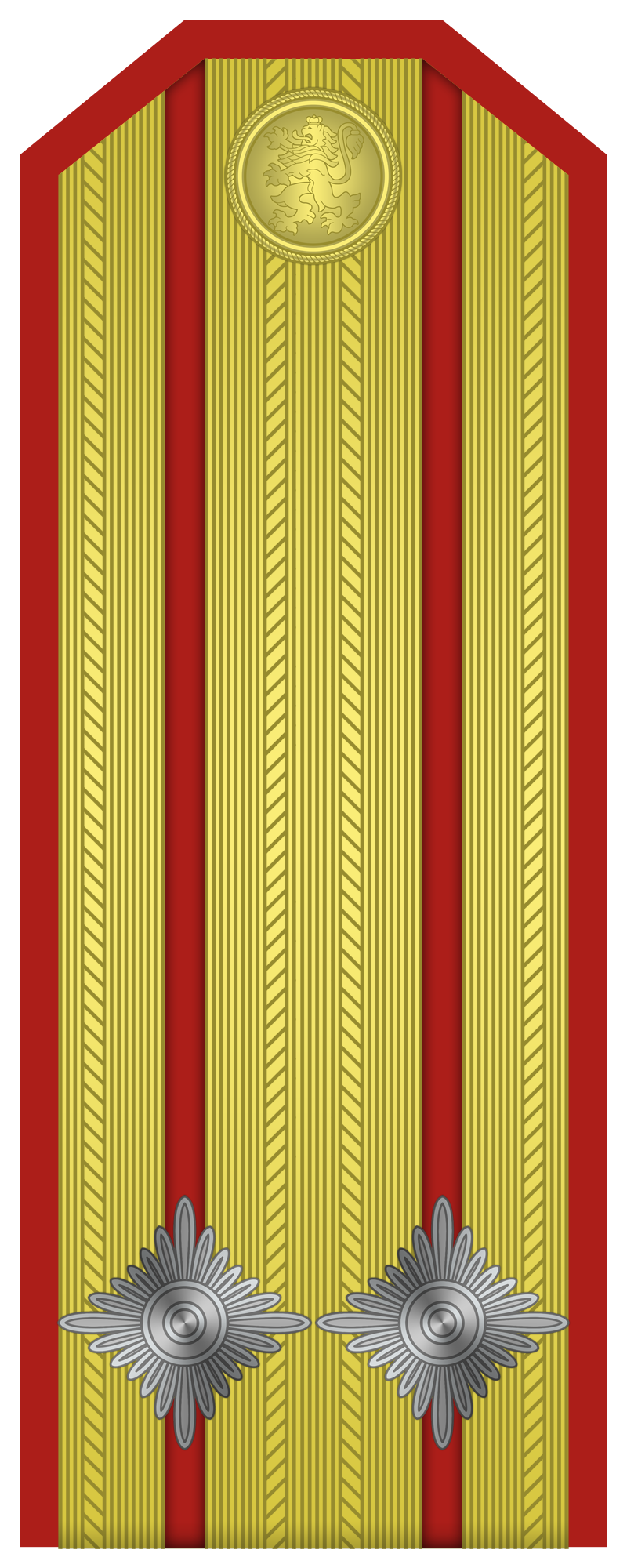
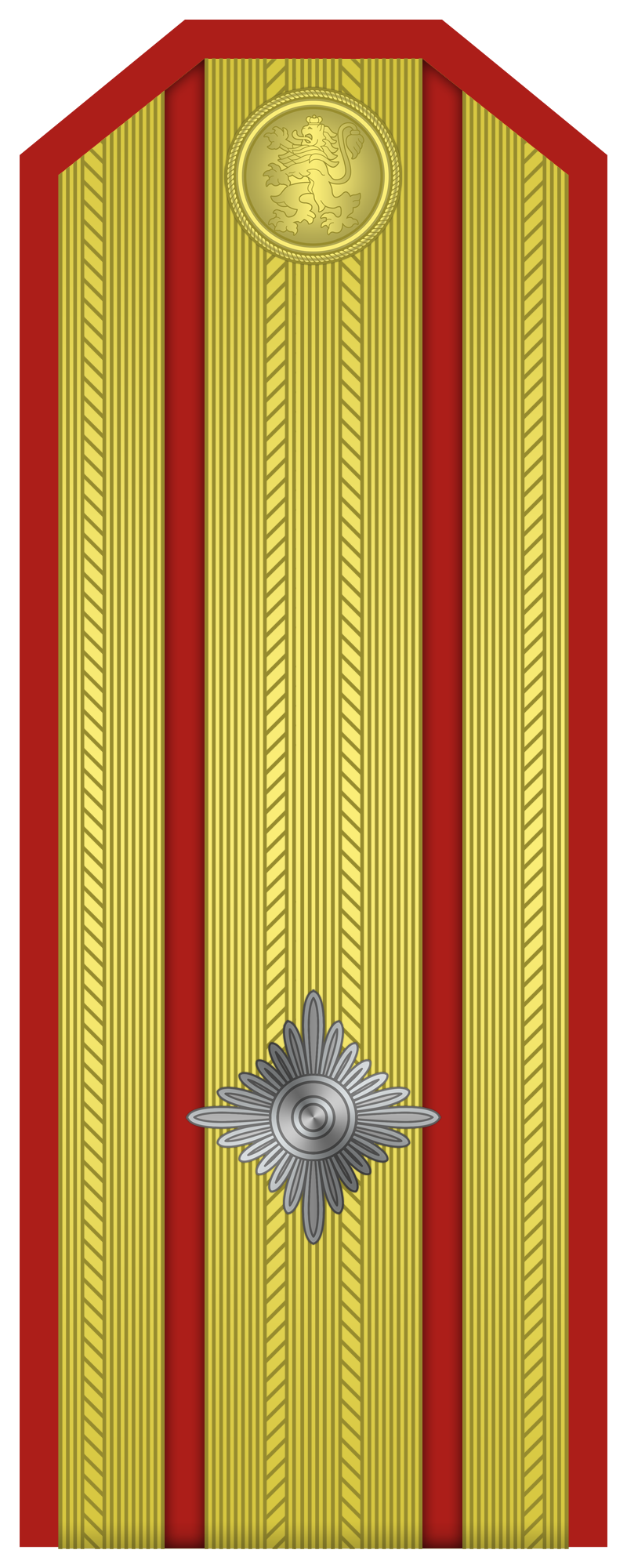
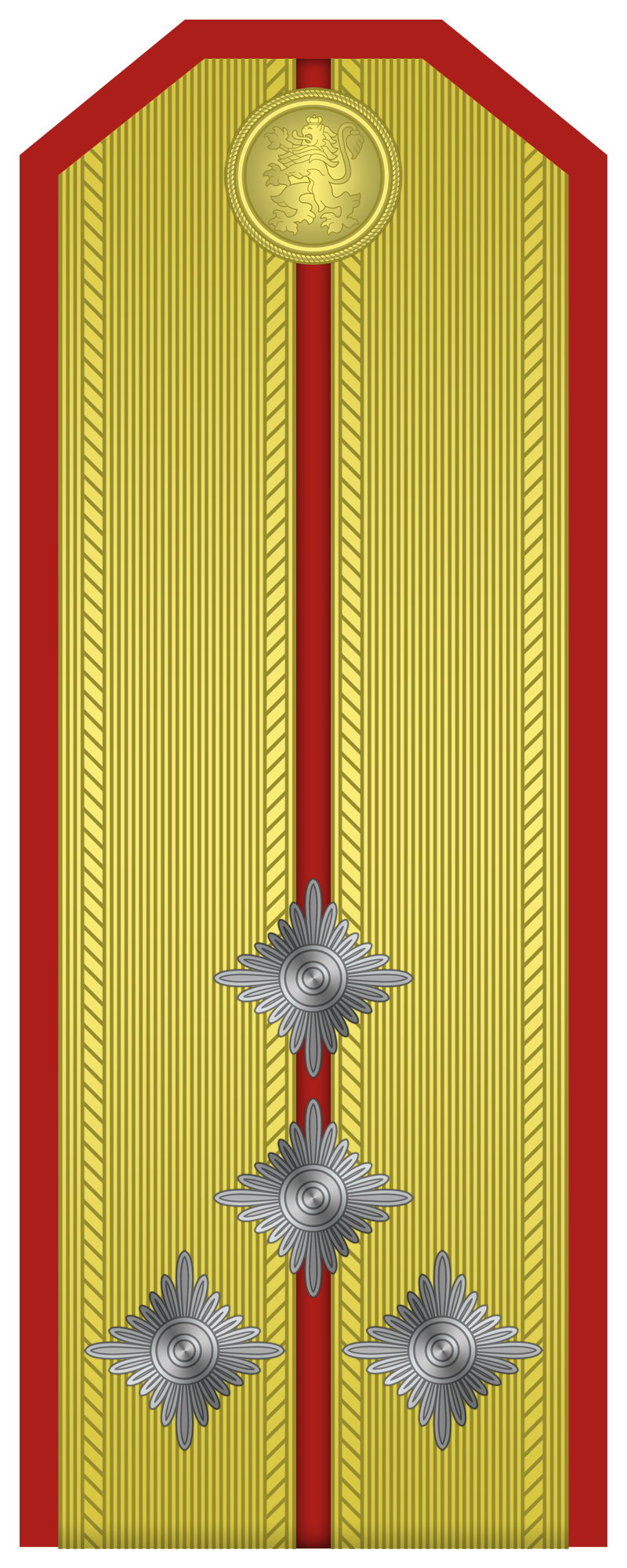
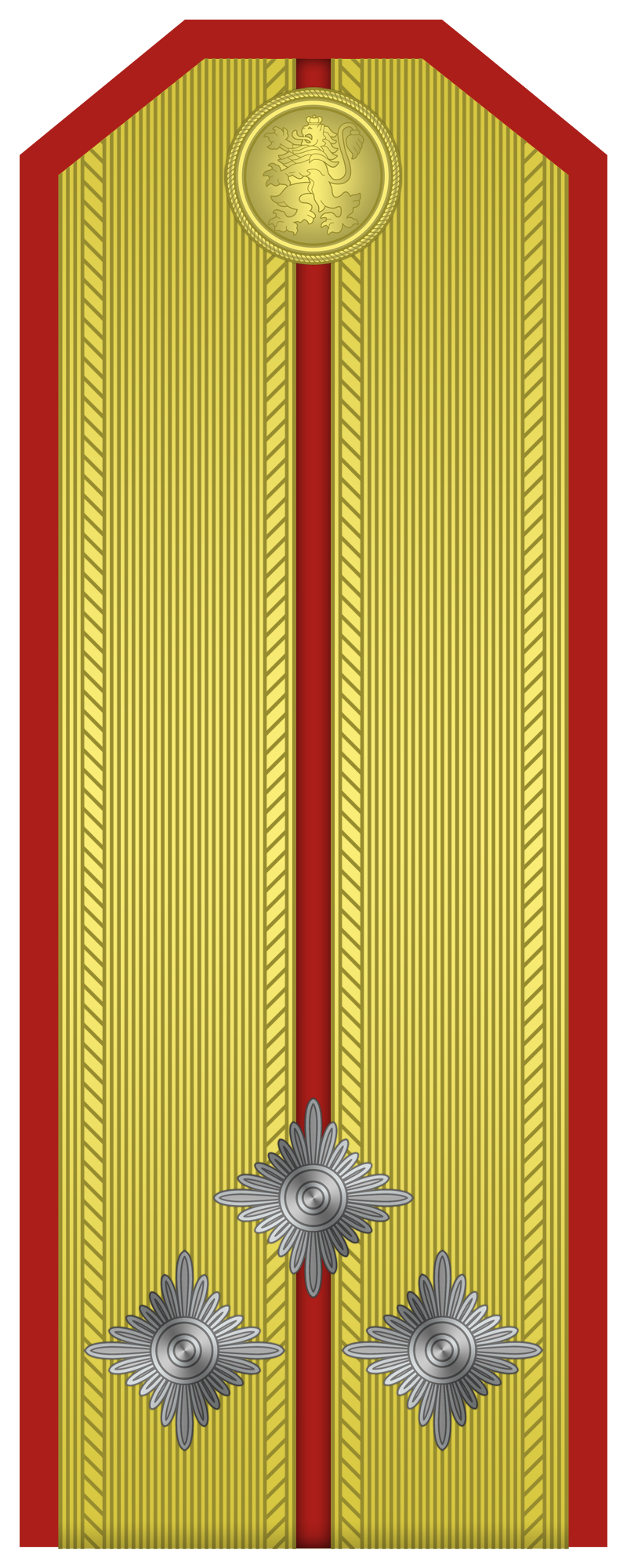
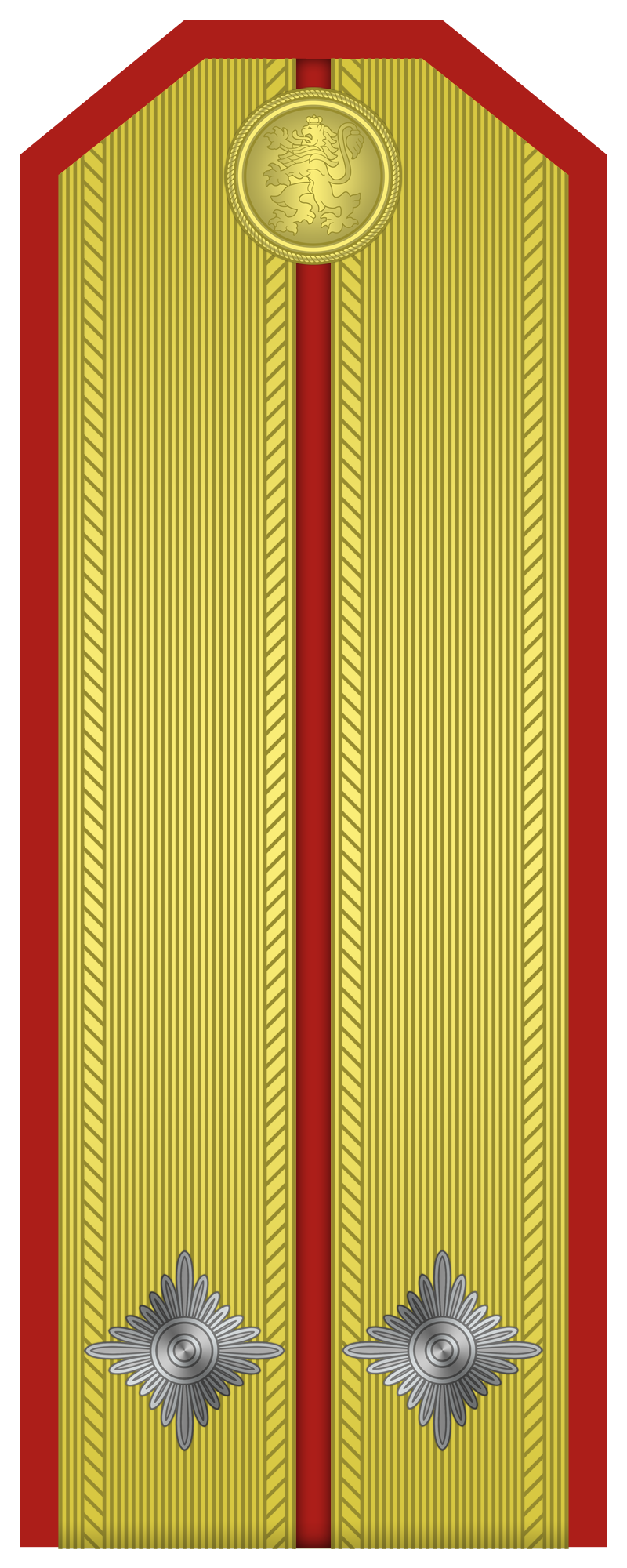
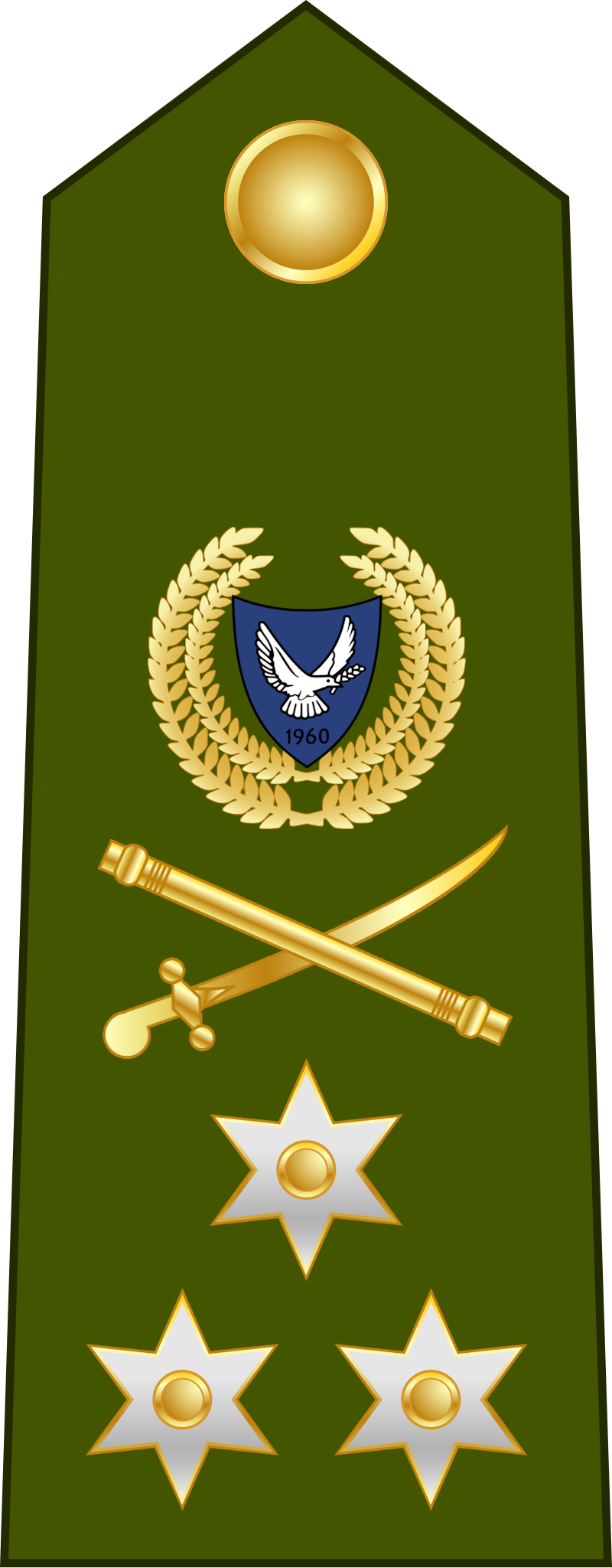
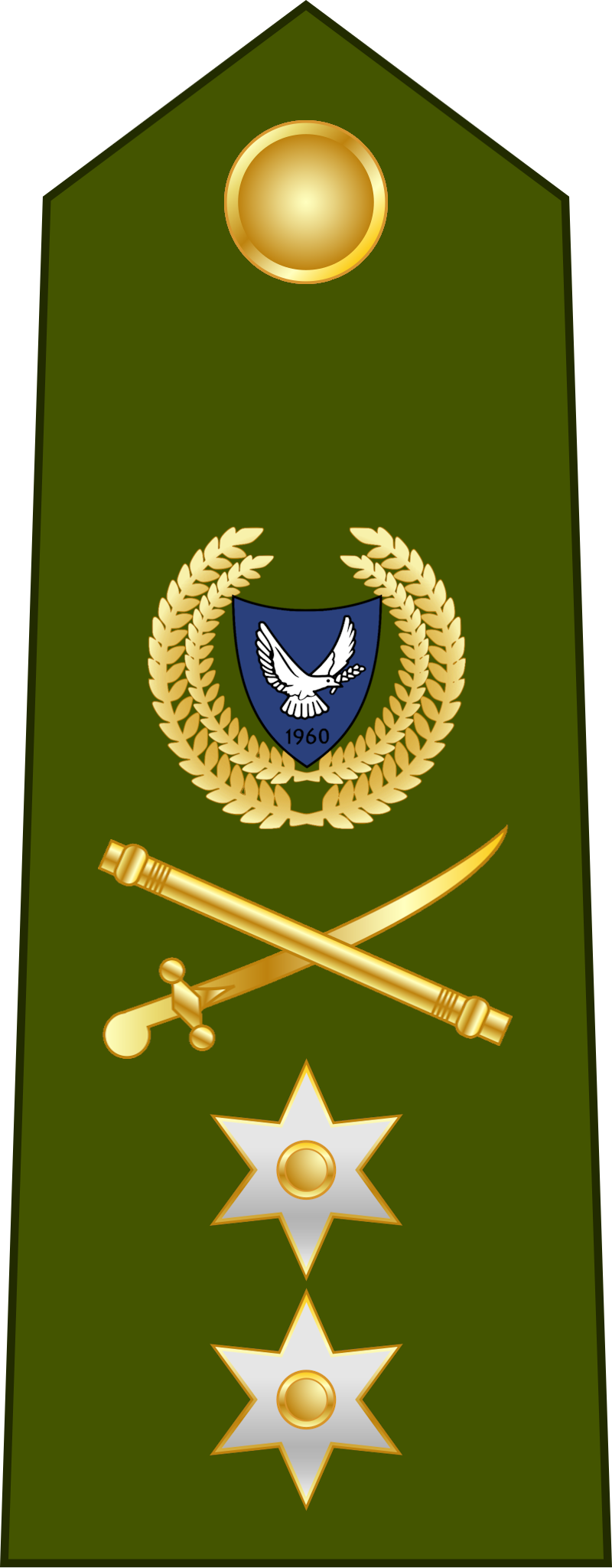
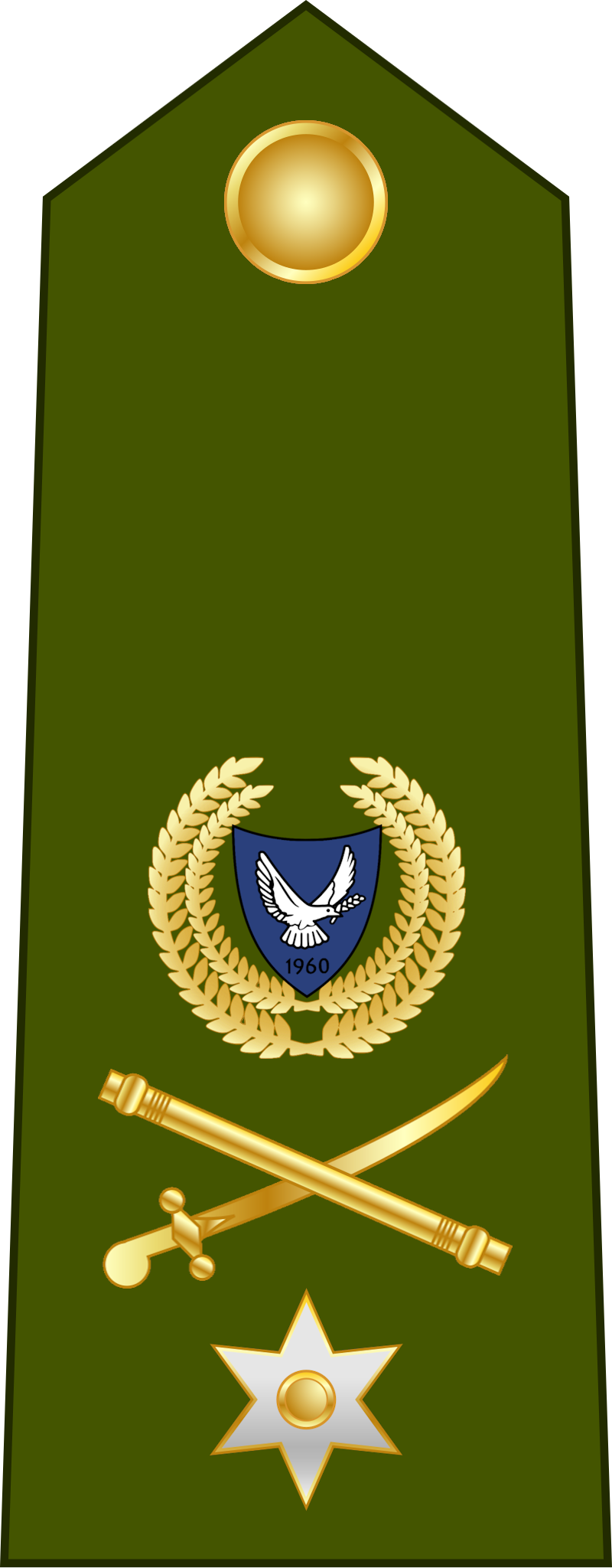
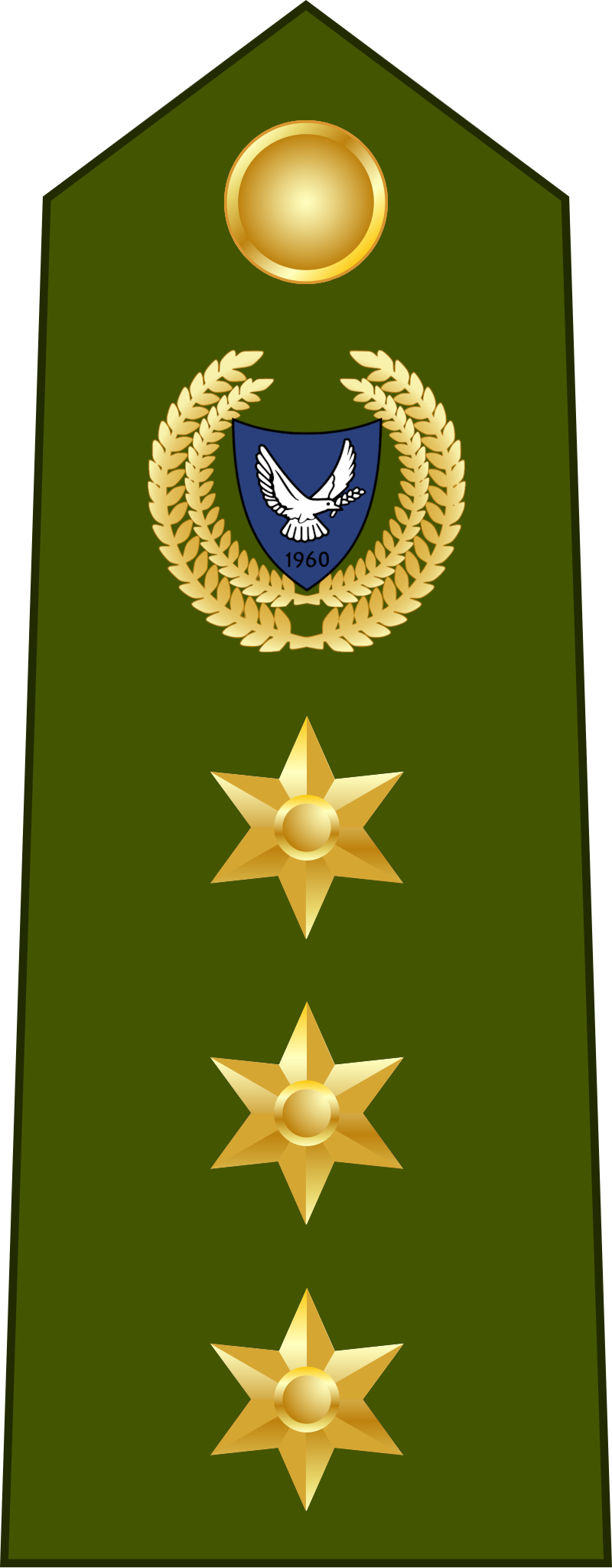
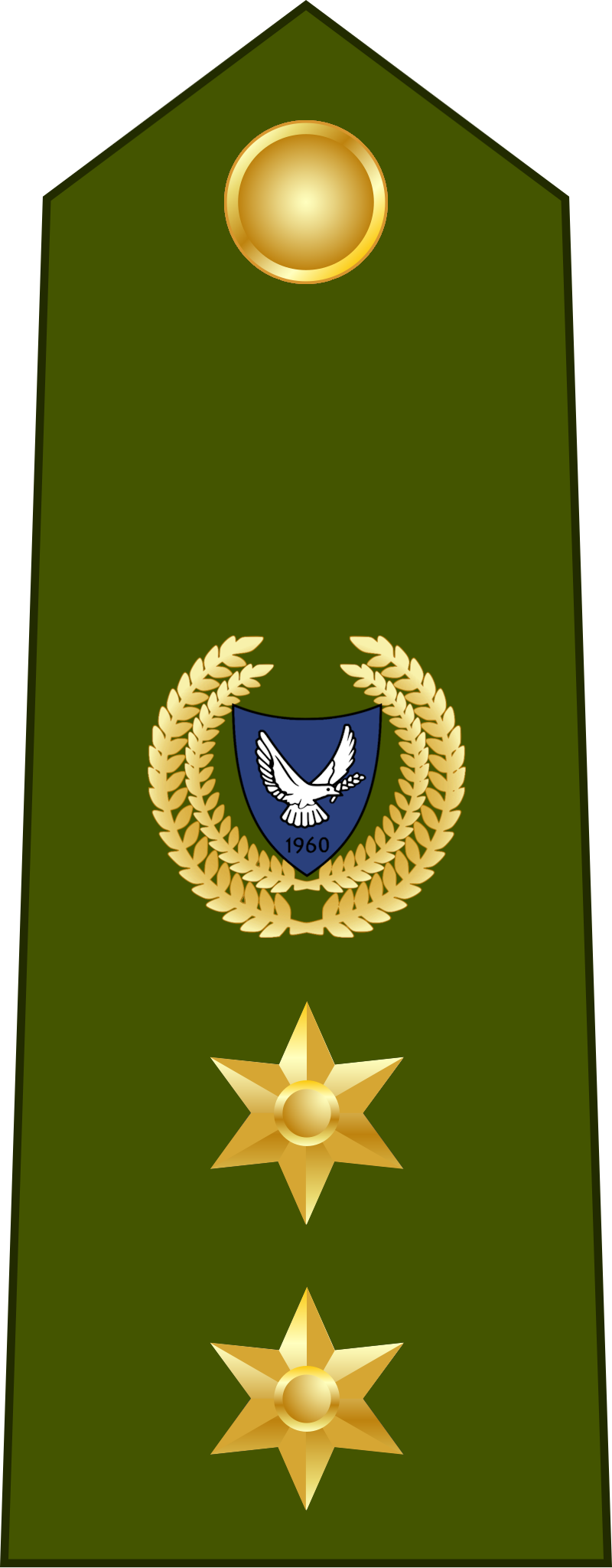
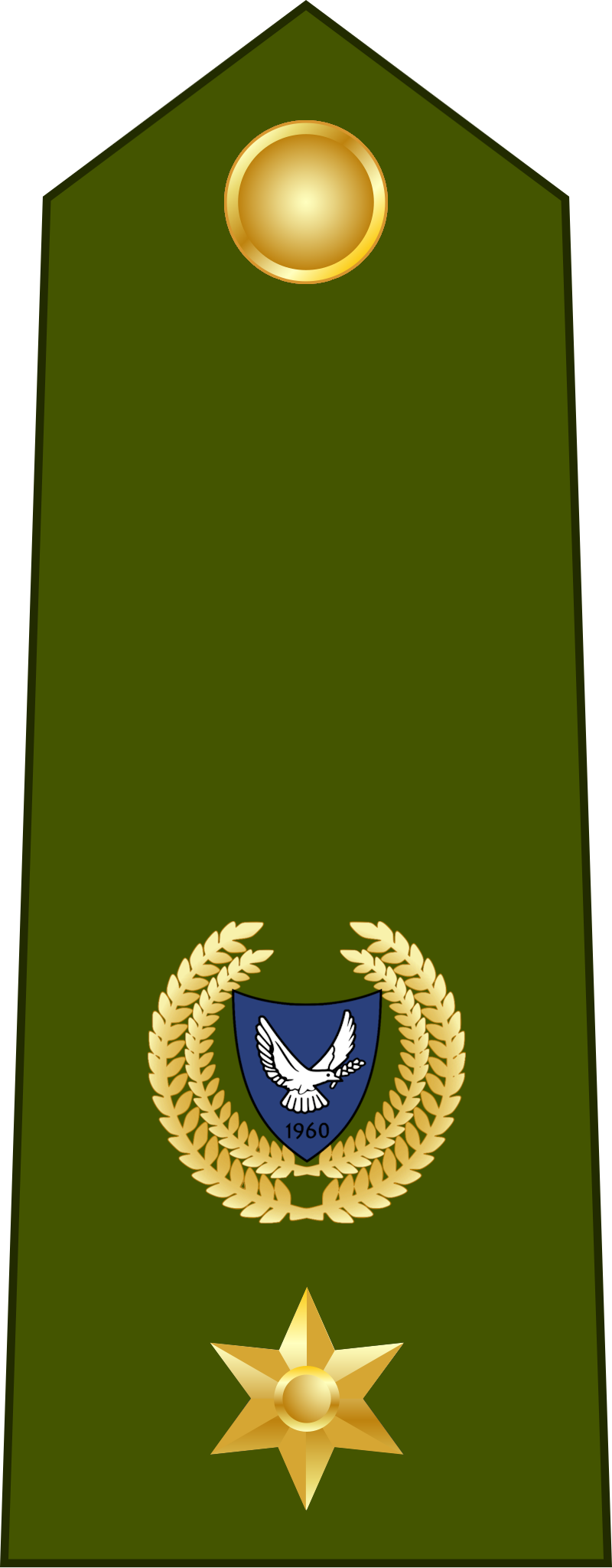
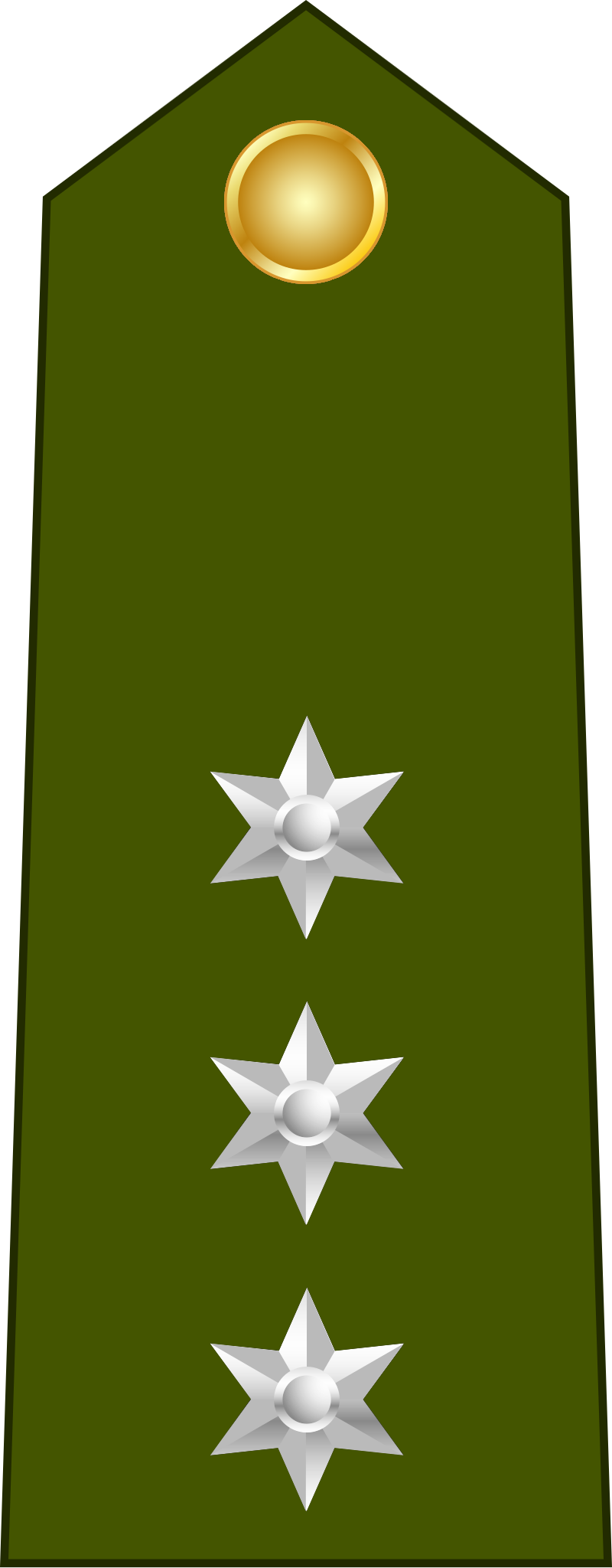
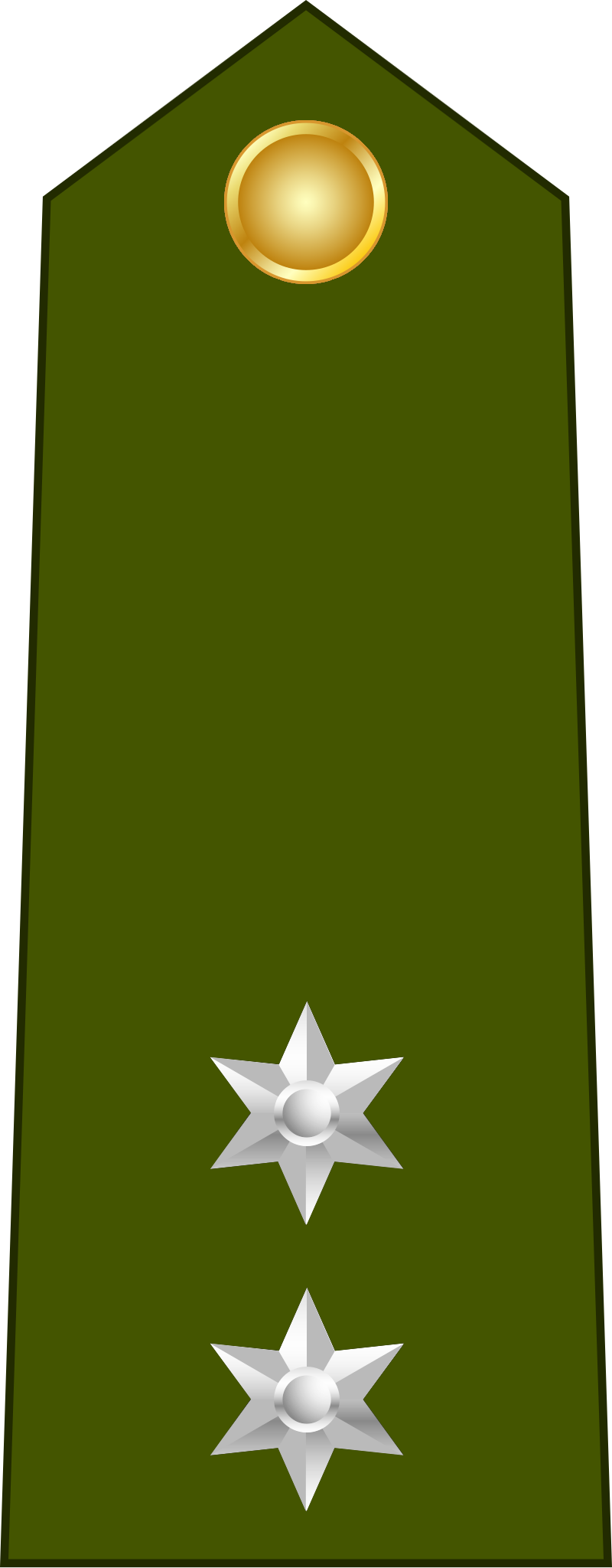
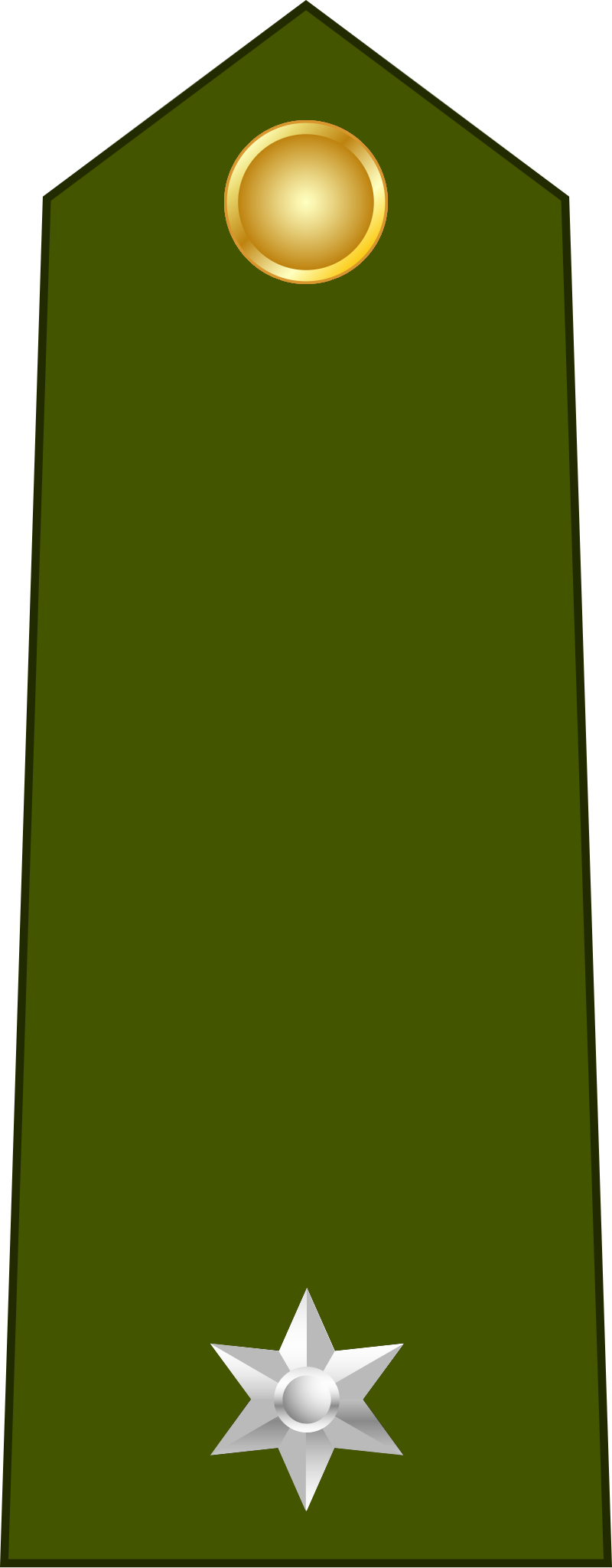
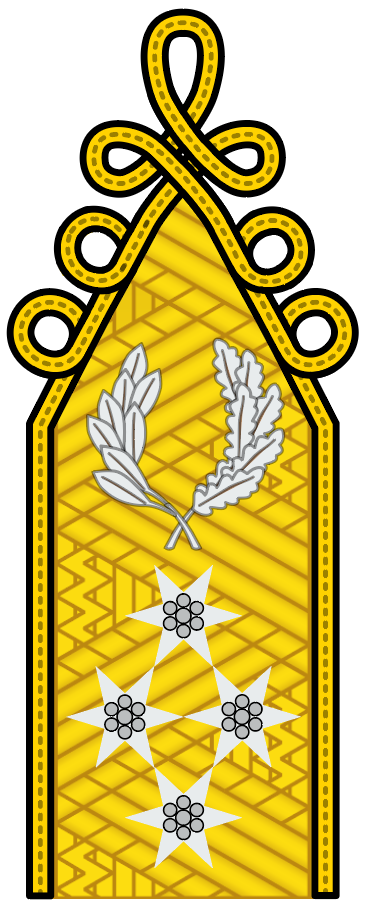
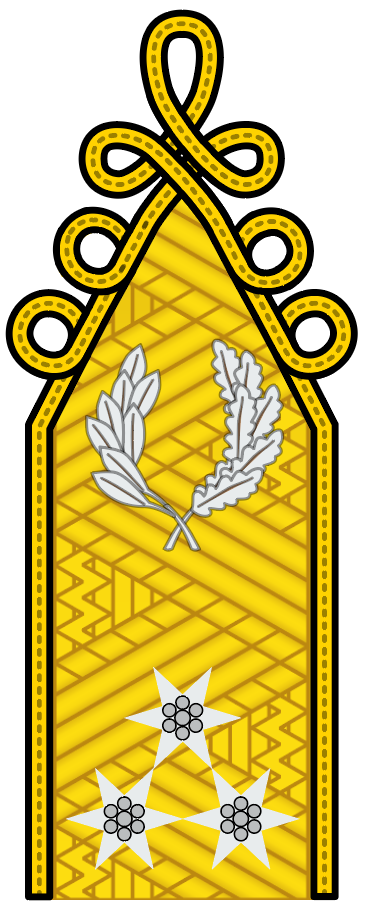
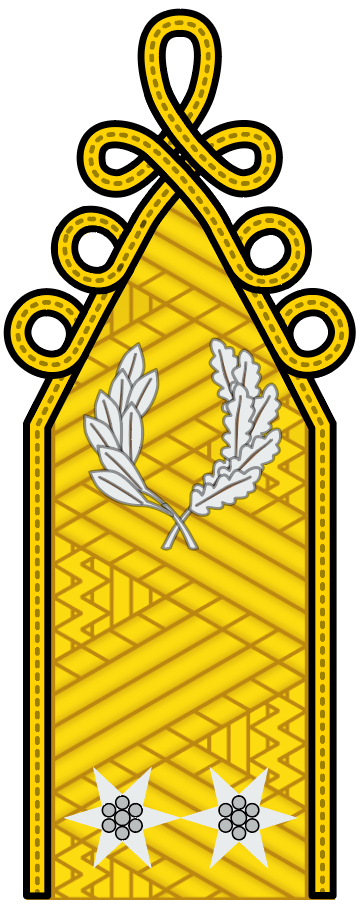
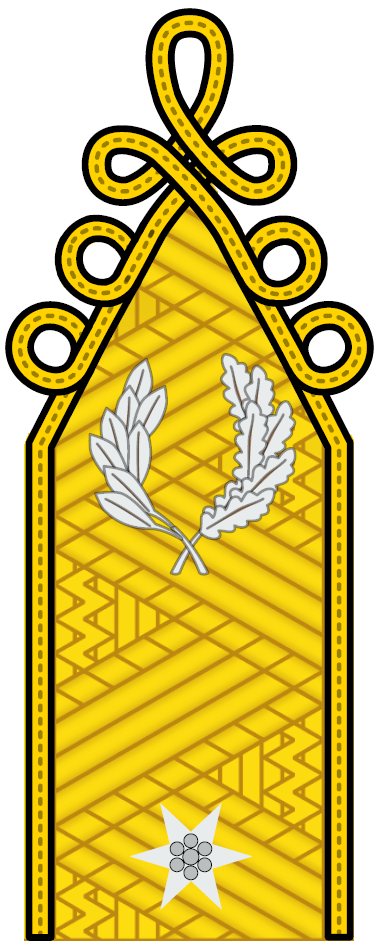
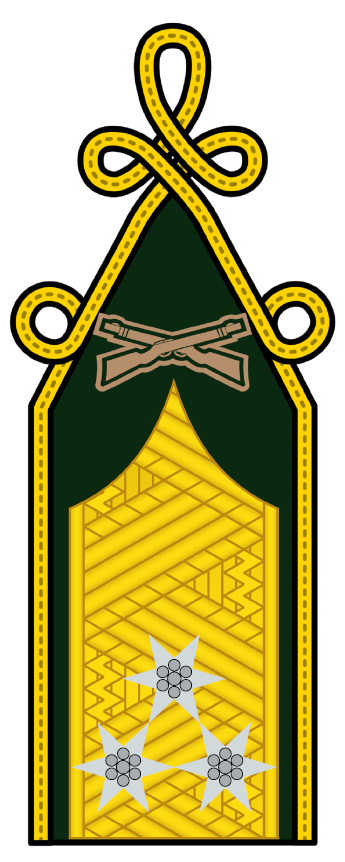
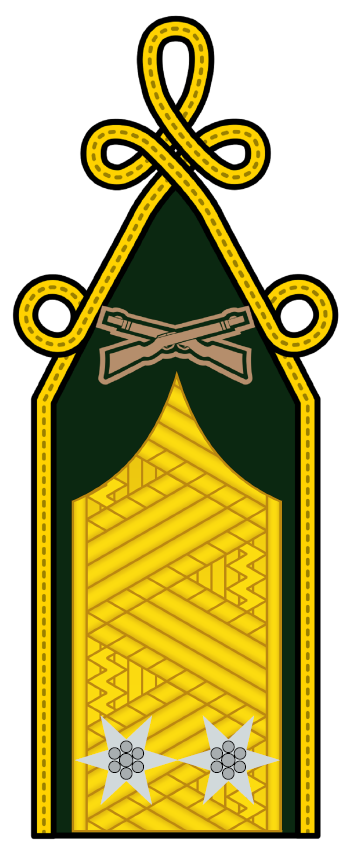
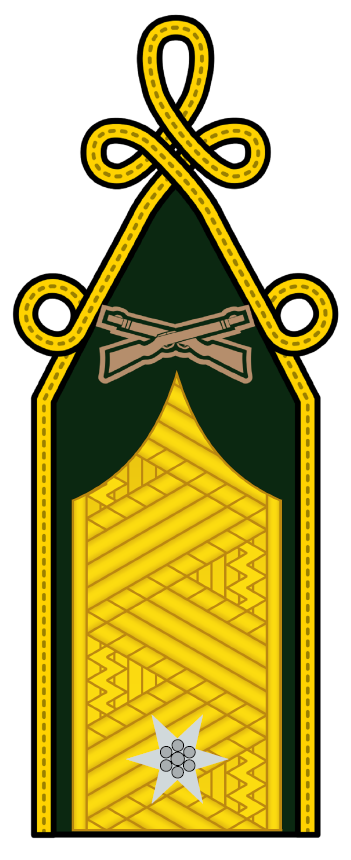
Rank group	General / flag officers					Senior officers					Junior officers
Austrian Land Forces
Austrian Land Forces		General	Generalleutnant	Generalmajor	Brigadier	Oberst		Oberstleutnant	Major		Hauptmann		Oberleutnant		Leutnant
Belgian Land Component
Belgian Land Component		Generaal	Luitenant-generaal	Generaal-majoor	Brigadegeneraal	Kolonel		Luitenant-kolonel	Majoor	Kapitein-commandant	Kapitein		Luitenant		Onderluitenant
Belgian Land Component		Général	Lieutenant général	Général-major	Général de Brigade	Colonel		Lieutenant-colonel	Major	Capitaine-commandant	Capitaine		Lieutenant		Sous-lieutenant
Belgian Land Component		General	Generalleutnant	Generalmajor	Brigadegeneral	Oberst		Oberstleutnant	Major	Stabshauptmann	Hauptmann		Leutnant		Unterleutnant
Bulgarian Land Forces
Bulgarian Land Forces		Генерал; General	Генерал-лейтенант; General-leytenant	Генерал-майор; General-mayor	Бригаден генерал Brigaden general	Полковник; Polkovnik		Подполковник; Podpolkovnik	Майор; Mayor		Капитан; Kapitan		Старши лейтенант Starshi leytenant		Лейтенант; Leytenant
Croatian Army
Croatian Army	Stožerni general	General zbora	General pukovnik	General bojnik	Brigadni general	Brigadir		Pukovnik	Bojnik		Satnik		Natporučnik		Poručnik
Cypriot Ground Forces
Cypriot Ground Forces			Αντιστράτηγος; Antistratigos	Υποστράτηγος; Ypostratigos	Ταξίαρχος; Taxiarchos	Συνταγματάρχης; Syntagmatarchis		Αντισυνταγματάρχης; Antisyntagmatarchis	Ταγματάρχης; Tagmatarchis		Λοχαγός; Lochagos		Υπολοχαγός; Ypolochagos		Ανθυπολοχαγός; Anthypolochagos
Czech Land Forces
Czech Land Forces		Armádní generál	Generálporučík	Generálmajor	Brigádní generál	Plukovník		Podplukovník	Major		Kapitán		Nadporučík		Poručík
Royal Danish Army
Royal Danish Army		General	Generalløjtnant	Generalmajor	Brigadegeneral	Oberst		Oberstløjtnant	Major		Kaptajn		Premierløjtnant	Løjtnant	Sekondløjtnant
Estonian Land Forces
Estonian Land Forces		Kindral	Kindralleitnant	Kindralmajor	Brigaadikindral	Kolonel		Kolonelleitnant	Major		Kapten		Leitnant	Nooremleitnant	Lipnik
Finnish Army
Finnish Army		Kenraali	Kenraaliluutnantti	Kenraalimajuri	Prikaatikenraali	Eversti		Everstiluutnantti	Majuri		Kapteeni		Yliluutnantti	Luutnantti	Vänrikki
Finnish Army		General	Generallöjtnant	Generalmajor	Brigadgeneral	Överste		Överstelöjtnant	Major		Kapten		Premiärlöjtnant	Löjtnant	Fänrik
Rank group	General / flag officers					Senior officers					Junior officers
French Army
French Army	Maréchal de France	Général d'armée	Général de corps d'armée	Général de division	Général de brigade	Colonel		Lieutenant-colonel	Commandant		Capitaine		Lieutenant		Sous-lieutenant
German Army
German Army		General	Generalleutnant	Generalmajor	Brigadegeneral	Oberst		Oberstleutnant	Major		Stabshauptmann	Hauptmann	Oberleutnant		Leutnant
Hellenic Army
Hellenic Army		Στρατηγός; Stratigos	Αντιστράτηγος; Antistratigos	Υποστράτηγος; Ypostratigos	Ταξίαρχος; Taxiarchos	Συνταγματάρχης; Syntagmatarchis		Αντισυνταγματάρχης; Antisyntagmatarchis	Ταγματάρχης; Tagmatarchis		Λοχαγός; Lochagos		Υπολοχαγός; Ypolochagos		Ανθυπολοχαγός; Anthypolochagos
Hungarian Ground Forces
Hungarian Ground Forces		Vezérezredes	Altábornagy	Vezérőrnagy	Dandártábornok	Ezredes		Alezredes	Őrnagy		Százados		Főhadnagy		Hadnagy
Irish Army
Irish Army			Lieutenant-general	Major-general	Brigadier-general	Colonel		Lieutenant-colonel	Commandant		Captain		Lieutenant		Second-Lieutenant
Irish Army			Lefteanant-ghinearál	Maor-ghinearál	Briogáidire-ghinearál	Cornal		Lefteanant-chornal	Ceannfort		Captaen		Lefteanant		Dara-lefteanant
Italian Army
Italian Army		Generale	Generale di Corpo d'Armata (Tenente Generale)	Generale di Divisione (Maggior Generale)	Generale di Brigata (Brigadier Generale)	Colonnello		Tenente Colonnello	Maggiore		Primo capitano	Capitano	Tenente		Sottotenente
Latvian Land Forces
Latvian Land Forces			Ģenerālleitnants	Ģenerālmajors	Brigādes ģenerālis	Pulkvedis		Pulkvežleitnants	Majors		Kapteinis		Virsleitnants		Leitnants
Lithuanian Land Force
Lithuanian Land Force		Generolas	Generolas leitenantas	Generolas majoras	Brigados generolas	Pulkininkas		Pulkininkas leitenantas	Majoras		Kapitonas		Vyresnysis leitenantas		Leitenantas
Luxembourg Army
Luxembourg Army					Général	Colonel		Lieutenant-colonel	Major		Capitaine		Lieutenant en premier		Lieutenant
Rank group	General / flag officers					Senior officers					Junior officers
Army of Malta
Army of Malta					Brigadier; Brigadier	Colonel; Kurunell		Lieutenant colonel Logutenent kurunell	Major; Maġġur		Captain; Kaptan		Lieutenant; Logutenent		Second lieutenant Sekond logutenent
Royal Netherlands Army
Royal Netherlands Army		Generaal	Luitenant-generaal	Generaal-majoor	Brigadegeneraal	Kolonel		Luitenant-kolonel	Majoor		Kapitein/ Ritmeester		Eerste luitenant		Tweede luitenant
Polish Land Forces
Polish Land Forces	Marszałek Polski	Generał	Generał broni	Generał dywizji	Generał brygady	Pułkownik		Podpułkownik	Major		Kapitan		Porucznik		Podporucznik
Portuguese Army
Portuguese Army	Marechal do Exército	General	Tenente-general	Major-general	Brigadeiro-general	Coronel-tirocinado (Note: Colonel who has completed the General Officer training course. Between 1929 and 1937, the Coronel-tirocinado was called Brigadeiro.)	Coronel	Tenente-coronel	Major		Capitão		Tenente		Alferes
Romanian Land Forces
Romanian Land Forces	Mareșal	General	General-locotenent	General-maior	General de brigadă	Colonel		Locotenent-colonel	Maior		Căpitan		Locotenent		Sublocotenent
Slovak Ground Forces
Slovak Ground Forces		Generál	Generálporučík (Note: The appropriate branch of service badge is pinned just under the top button of the for all ranks excluding full General.)	Generálmajor	Brigádny generál	Plukovník		Podplukovník	Major		Kapitán		Nadporučík		Poručík
Slovenian Ground Force
Slovenian Ground Force		General	Generalpodpolkovnik	Generalmajor	Brigadir	Polkovnik		Podpolkovnik	Major		Stotnik		Nadporočnik		Poročnik
Spanish Army
Spanish Army	Capitán general	General de ejército	Teniente general	General de división	General de brigada	Coronel		Teniente coronel	Comandante		Capitán		Teniente		Alférez
Swedish Army
Swedish Army		General	Generallöjtnant	Generalmajor	Brigadgeneral	Överste		Överstelöjtnant	Major		Kapten		Löjtnant		Fänrik
Rank group	General / flag officers					Senior officers					Junior officers

Remark:
NATO STANAG 2116 lists Officer Designates (listed here as OF(D)) of some countries alongside OF-1 ranks.

== See also ==
- Comparative army enlisted ranks of the European Union
- Military rank
- Comparative navy officer ranks of the European Union
- Comparative navy enlisted ranks of the European Union
- Comparative air force officer ranks of the European Union
- Comparative air force enlisted ranks of the European Union
- Ranks and insignia of NATO armies officers
- Comparative army officer ranks of Europe
