= Finnish military ranks =

The military ranks of Finland are the military insignia used by the Finnish Defence Forces. The ranks incorporate features from the Swedish, German, and Russian armed forces. In addition, the system has some typically Finnish characteristics that are mostly due to the personnel structure of the Finnish Defence Forces. The ranks have official names in Finnish and Swedish languages and official English translations. The Swedish forms are used in all Swedish-language communications in Finland, e.g. in Swedish-speaking units of the Finnish Defence Force. The system of ranks in the Swedish Armed Forces is different.

Finland practices universal conscription of men (c. 75% of each age class), and maintains only a cadre of professional personnel for training and maintaining military readiness. Most of the lower ranks are conscripts, and leave service as sotamies or korpraali. Junior non-commissioned officers, about 20% of age class, serve 12 months and leave service as alikersantti or kersantti. 10% of conscripts are trained as reserve officers, serving 12 months, and leave service usually as vänrikki or in the Navy as aliluutnantti. In principle, there should be no distinction between reserve and active ranks, and NCOs and reserve officers can be promoted in reserve, up to everstiluutnantti. During peace time, reservists are inactive, i.e. they do not receive pay or have a position in the chain of command. Reservists are in duty only when mobilized during a crisis or when attending mandatory or voluntary refresher exercises. Nevertheless, reserve NCO or officer ranks are an entrance requirement to a military or border guard career.

Rank and file and non-commissioned officers are promoted to their ranks by the commander of a brigade or equivalent, with the exception of the highest NCO ranks of ylivääpeli and sotilasmestari, who are promoted by the service commander and Chief of Staff of the Defence Command, respectively. All officers from vänrikki and higher are promoted to their ranks and commissioned to their offices by the President of Finland. Professional officers are trained at the Finnish National Defence University. Career officers graduate first as sotatieteen kandidaatti (Bachelor of Military Science), with an automatic promotion to luutnantti, then work for 3–4 years' work as temporary officers. After this, they continue their studies to sotatieteen maisteri (Master of Military Science) and are promoted to yliluutnantti. After graduation, they are promoted to kapteeni and receive a permanent commission.

== Table of ranks ==
The ranks currently used by the Finnish Defence Forces.

=== Commissioned officer ranks ===
The rank insignia of commissioned officers.

Rank group	General/flag officers					Senior officers			Junior officers
NATO code (Note: Finland had an official conversion before its full membership.)	OF-10	OF-9	OF-8	OF-7	OF-6	OF-5	OF-4	OF-3	OF-2	OF-1
Field uniform Army, Air Force, Border Guard
Field uniform Navy, Coast Guard
Finnish Army
Finnish Army		Kenraali	Kenraaliluutnantti	Kenraalimajuri	Prikaatikenraali	Eversti	Everstiluutnantti	Majuri	Kapteeni	Yliluutnantti	Luutnantti	Vänrikki
Finnish Army		General	Generallöjtnant	Generalmajor	Brigadgeneral	Överste	Överstelöjtnant	Major	Kapten	Premiärlöjtnant	Löjtnant	Fänrik
Finnish Navy
Finnish Navy		Amiraali	Vara-amiraali	Kontra-amiraali	Lippueamiraali	Kommodori	Komentaja	Komentajakapteeni	Kapteeniluutnantti	Yliluutnantti	Luutnantti	Aliluutnantti
Finnish Navy		Amiral	Viceamiral	Konteramiral	Flottiljamiral	Kommodor	Kommendör	Kommendörkapten	Kaptenlöjtnant	Premiärlöjtnant	Löjtnant	Underlöjtnant
Finnish Air Force
Finnish Air Force		Kenraali	Kenraaliluutnantti	Kenraalimajuri	Prikaatikenraali	Eversti	Everstiluutnantti	Majuri	Kapteeni	Yliluutnantti	Luutnantti	Vänrikki
Finnish Air Force		General	Generallöjtnant	Generalmajor	Brigadgeneral	Överste	Överstelöjtnant	Major	Kapten	Premiärlöjtnant	Löjtnant	Fänrik
(Finland) Finnish Border Guard
(Finland) Finnish Border Guard		Kenraali/ Amiraali	Kenraaliluutnantti/ Vara-amiraali	Kenraalimajuri/ Kontra-amiraali	Prikaatikenraali/ Lippueamiraali	Eversti/ Kommodori	Everstiluutnantti/ Komentaja	Majuri/ Komentajakapteeni	Kapteeni/ Kapteeniluutnantti	Yliluutnantti/ Yliluutnantti	Luutnantti/ Luutnantti	Vänrikki/ Aliluutnantti
(Finland) Finnish Border Guard		General/ Amiral	Generallöjtnant/ Viceamiral	Generalmajor/ Konteramiral	Brigadgeneral/ Flottiljamiral	Överste/ Kommodor	Överstelöjtnant/ Kommendör	Major/ Kommendörkapten	Kapten/ Kaptenlöjtnant	Premiärlöjtnant	Löjtnant	Fänrik/ Underlöjtnant
NATO code	OF-10	OF-9	OF-8	OF-7	OF-6	OF-5	OF-4	OF-3	OF-2	OF-1

=== Other ranks ===
The rank insignia of non-commissioned officers and enlisted personnel.

Rank group	NCOs						Rank-and-file
NATO code	OR-9	OR-8	OR-7	OR-6	OR-5	OR-4	OR-3	OR-2	OR-1
Field uniform
Finnish Army
Finnish Army	Sotilasmestari	Ylivääpeli	Vääpeli	Ylikersantti	Kersantti	Alikersantti	Korpraali	Sotamies
Finnish Army	Militärmästare	Överfältväbel	Fältväbel	Översergeant	Sergeant	Undersergeant	Korpral	Soldat
Finnish Navy
Finnish Navy	Sotilasmestari	Ylipursimies	Pursimies	Ylikersantti	Kersantti	Alikersantti	Ylimatruusi	Matruusi
Finnish Navy	Militärmästare	Överbåtsman	Båtsman	Översergeant	Sergeant	Undersergeant	Övermatros	Matros
Finnish Air Force
Finnish Air Force	Sotilasmestari	Ylivääpeli	Vääpeli	Ylikersantti	Kersantti	Alikersantti	Korpraali	Lentosotamies
Finnish Air Force	Militärmästare	Överfältväbel	Fältväbel	Översergeant	Sergeant	Undersergeant	Korpral	Soldat
(Finland) Finnish Border Guard
(Finland) Finnish Border Guard	Sotilasmestari	Ylivääpeli/ Ylipursimies	Vääpeli/ Pursimies	Ylikersantti	Kersantti	Alikersantti	Korpraali/ Ylimatruusi	Sotamies
(Finland) Finnish Border Guard	Militärmästare	Överfältväbel/ Överbåtsman	Fältväbel/ Båtsman	Översergeant	Sergeant	Undersergeant	Korpral/ Övermatros	Soldat
Border Guard service ranks	Rajavartiomestari	Ylirajavartija		Vanhempi rajavartija	Nuorempi rajavartija
Border Guard service ranks	Bevakningsmästare	Överbevakare		Äldrebevakare	Yngrebevakare
NATO code	OR-9	OR-8	OR-7	OR-6	OR-5	OR-4	OR-3	OR-2	OR-1

=== Conscript ranks during compulsory national service ===
The rank insignia of the conscripts during compulsory national service. During the service period these are junior to all career personnel.

Rank group	NCOs								Rank-and-file
NATO code	OR-9	OR-8	OR-7	OR-6	OR-5		OR-4		OR-3		OR-2		OR-1
Field uniform
Finnish Army
Finnish Army					Upseerikokelas	Kersantti	Upseerioppilas	Alikersantti	Aliupseerioppilas (Korpraali)	Korpraali	Aliupseerioppilas	Sotamies	Alokas
Finnish Army					Officersaspirant	Sergeant	Officerselev	Undersergeant	Elevkorpral	Korpral	Underofficerselev	Soldat	Rekryt
Finnish Navy
Finnish Navy					Upseerikokelas	Kersantti	Upseerioppilas	Alikersantti	Aliupseerioppilas	Ylimatruusi	Aliupseerioppilas	Matruusi	Alokas
Finnish Navy					Officersaspirant	Sergeant	Officerselev	Undersergeant	Underofficerselev	Övermatros	Underofficerselev	Matros	Rekryt
Finnish Air Force
Finnish Air Force					Upseerikokelas	Kersantti	Upseerioppilas	Alikersantti	Aliupseerioppilas	Korpraali	Aliupseerioppilas	Lentosotamies	Alokas
Finnish Air Force					Officersaspirant	Sergeant	Officerselev	Undersergeant	Underofficerselev	Korpral	Underofficerselev	Flygsoldat	Rekryt
Finnish Border Guard
Finnish Border Guard					Upseerikokelas	Kersantti	Upseerioppilas	Alikersantti	Aliupseerioppilas	Ylirajajääkäri	Aliupseerioppilas	Rajajääkäri	Alokas
Finnish Border Guard					Officersaspirant	Sergeant	Officerselev	Undersergeant	Underofficerselev	Övergränsjägare	Underofficerselev	Gränsjägare	Rekryt
NATO code	OR-9	OR-8	OR-7	OR-6	OR-5		OR-4		OR-3		OR-2		OR-1

=== Ranks of the Cadets of the National Defence University ===
Cadets of the National Defence university have their own rank, senior to vänrikki, and in addition are distinguished between each other by the class year seniority, and also internal ranks given from success in studies and general leadership qualities. All of the cadets share the same collar insignia, but the epaulettes or the field uniform insignia reflect the class year seniority and internal rank.

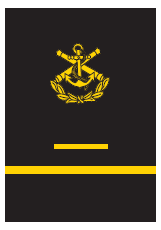
Rank group	Cadet leaders				Cadets
NATO code	OF-1
Field uniform
Finnish Army
Finnish Army	Kadettivääpeli	Kadettiylikersantti	Kadettikersantti	Kadettialikersantti	Kadetti
Finnish Army	Kadettfältväbel	Kadettöversergeant	Kadettsergeant	Kadettundersergeant	Kadett
Finnish Navy
Finnish Navy	Kadettipursimies	Kadettiylikersantti	Kadettikersantti	Kadettialikersantti	Kadetti
Finnish Navy	Kadettbåtsman	Kadettöversergeant	Kadettsergeant	Kadettundersergeant	Kadett
Finnish Air Force
Finnish Air Force	Kadettivääpeli	Kadettiylikersantti	Kadettikersantti	Kadettialikersantti	Kadetti
Finnish Air Force	Kadettfältväbel	Kadettöversergeant	Kadettsergeant	Kadettundersergeant	Kadett
Finnish Border Guard
Finnish Border Guard	Kadettivääpeli	Kadettiylikersantti	Kadettikersantti	Kadettialikersantti	Kadetti
Finnish Border Guard	Kadettfältväbel	Kadettöversergeant	Kadettsergeant	Kadettundersergeant	Kadett
NATO code	OF-1

=== Military chaplains ===
NATO code	OF-6	OF-4	OF-2
Collar
Shoulder
	Kenttäpiispa	Kenttärovasti	Sotilaspastori
	Fältbiskopen	Fältprost	Militärpastor

=== Branch Colors ===
General Staff

Infantry

Jaeger (units with jaeger traditions)

Guard Jaeger

Finnish Border Guard

Dragoon

Cavalryman (-2014)

Army Academy

Reserve Officer School

Cadet School

Finnish Air Force

Armour

Army Aviation

Logistics

Military Band

Field Artillery

Ground-based air defence

Electronic Warfare Centre

Engineers

Signals

Military medicine

=== Personnel groups ===
The military personnel of the Finnish Defence Forces is divided into three groups:

- command personnel (päällystö)
- junior command personnel (alipäällystö)
- rank and file (miehistö)

The rank-and-file (miehistö) consists of personnel with the rank of sotamies or korpraali; personnel which haven't completed NCO training during their conscript service may be promoted up to NCO ranks of alikersantti or kersantti in the reserves, and their status changes accordingly; further promotions past kersantti aren't possible. Soldiers in the rank of a private always have a branch or service specific title such as tykkimies "gunner" or matruusi, "seaman"; the non-specific rank of sotamies is no longer in use (see below). The NCO students rank as privates until they are promoted to the rank of Corporal.

The junior command personnel are formed from the professional or reserve NCOs and conscripts serving in ranks of corporal, officer student, sergeant or officer candidate or their naval equivalents. However, by regulation, all professional servicemen outrank conscripts.

The command personnel is formed of commissioned officers, commissioned officer specialists, warrant officers (opistoupseeri) and cadets.

Reservists belong to the personnel group determined by their military rank, but hold the position in the chain of command only from the moment they report to duty (or should have reported to duty) to the moment they have been discharged and have left the military installation. Unlike conscripts, the reservists rank with the professional military personnel without prejudice. The highest rank available to reserve officers is lieutenant colonel, but it is only awarded for special service or accomplishments.

== Insignia ==
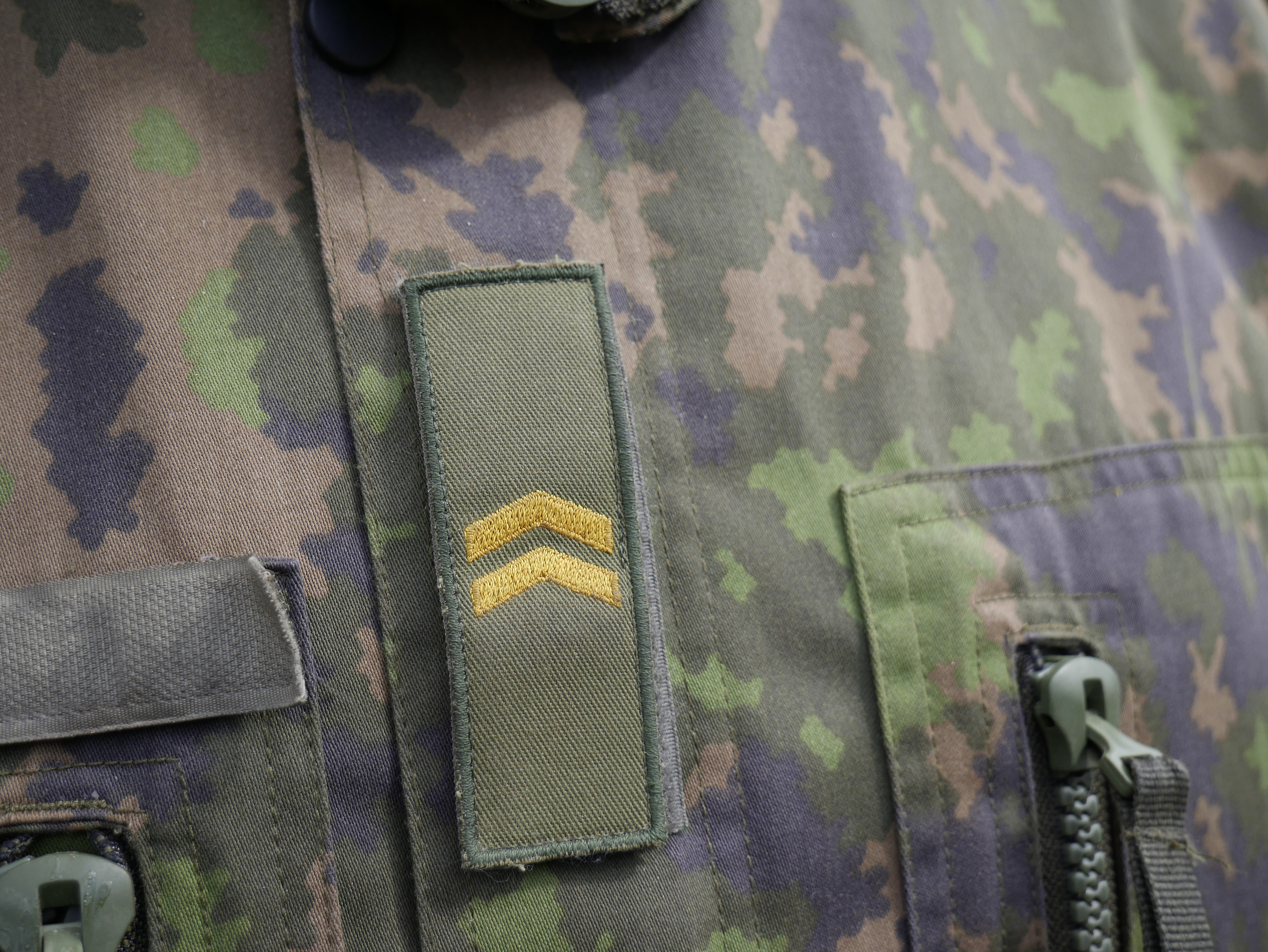
Alikersantti

The insignia is different from other European systems by some features. Stars are not used in the insignia. Heraldic roses, instead of oak leaves, denote ranks from second lieutenant to colonel. Generals wear lions (Lion of Finland), not stars. The qualifiers yli "Senior" and ali "Junior" are used in the names of some ranks; for example, kersantti is "Sergeant", while alikersantti is "Junior Sergeant" (Corporal).

In the army the insignia are placed on the collar in parade and service uniforms M/58 and M/83 and in field uniforms M/62 and M/91. The Air Force places the insignia on the sleeve of M/51 instead of the collar. In the Navy where they have different parade dress they place the ranks on the sleeve and they also have the M/83 insignia on the shoulders. If the insignia are placed on the arm or on the sleeve, sleeve insignia are used. Sleeve insignia consists of parallel gold bars or chevrons. On the modern field uniform M/05, the rank insignia are placed on the chest. The colours of the background and the lining on the Army and Air Force collar patches indicate branch of specialization. In field uniforms, the collar patches do not carry branch colours, borders or corner accents. The national flag and the serviceman's unit insignia on a coloured background determined by branch are carried on the arm on field uniforms M/91 and M/05. However, conscripts typically only wear the Finnish flag and their rank insignia on their uniforms while not on leave. In the table above, the army insignia for ranks from Private to Major are depicted on infantry collar patches, with the exception of Officer Student, which features Reserve Officer School collar patches. General officers' collar patches are most often gold on red, because red is the colour of Defence Command (Finland). However, generals serving as unit commanders or on special tasks retain the colours of their unit's branch.

In the Navy uniform, officers and Warrant officers wear the Lion of Finland on the top of their insignia, while Non-commissioned officers use the special insignia of their duty branch. In field uniforms, these emblems are dropped. Specialist officers always wear their specialist insignia in addition to their rank insignia on the collar patches. On sleeve and shoulder insignia, the specialty is denoted by coloured insignia background.

NCO students do not wear any collar insignia. Their sole rank insignia consists of a silver line worn on the shoulder or arm of all uniforms, except in M/05 where the silver line is worn on the chest.

=== Historic rank insignia ===
Rank group	General/flag officers				Senior officers			Junior officers
1922–1936
1922–1936	Sotamarsalkka; Fältmarskalk	Kenraali; General	Kenraaliluutnantti; Generallöjtnant	Kenraalimajuri; Generalmajor	Eversti; Överste	Everstiluutnantti; Överstelöjtnant	Majuri; Major	Kapteeni/ratsumestari; Kapten	Luutnantti; Löjtnant	Vänrikki/kornetti; Fänrik
1936–?
1936–?	Suomen marsalkka Marskalk av Finland	Kenraali; General	Kenraaliluutnantti; Generallöjtnant	Kenraalimajuri; Generalmajor	Eversti; Överste	Everstiluutnantti; Överstelöjtnant	Majuri; Major	Kapteeni; Kapten	Luutnantti; Löjtnant	Vänrikki; Fänrik

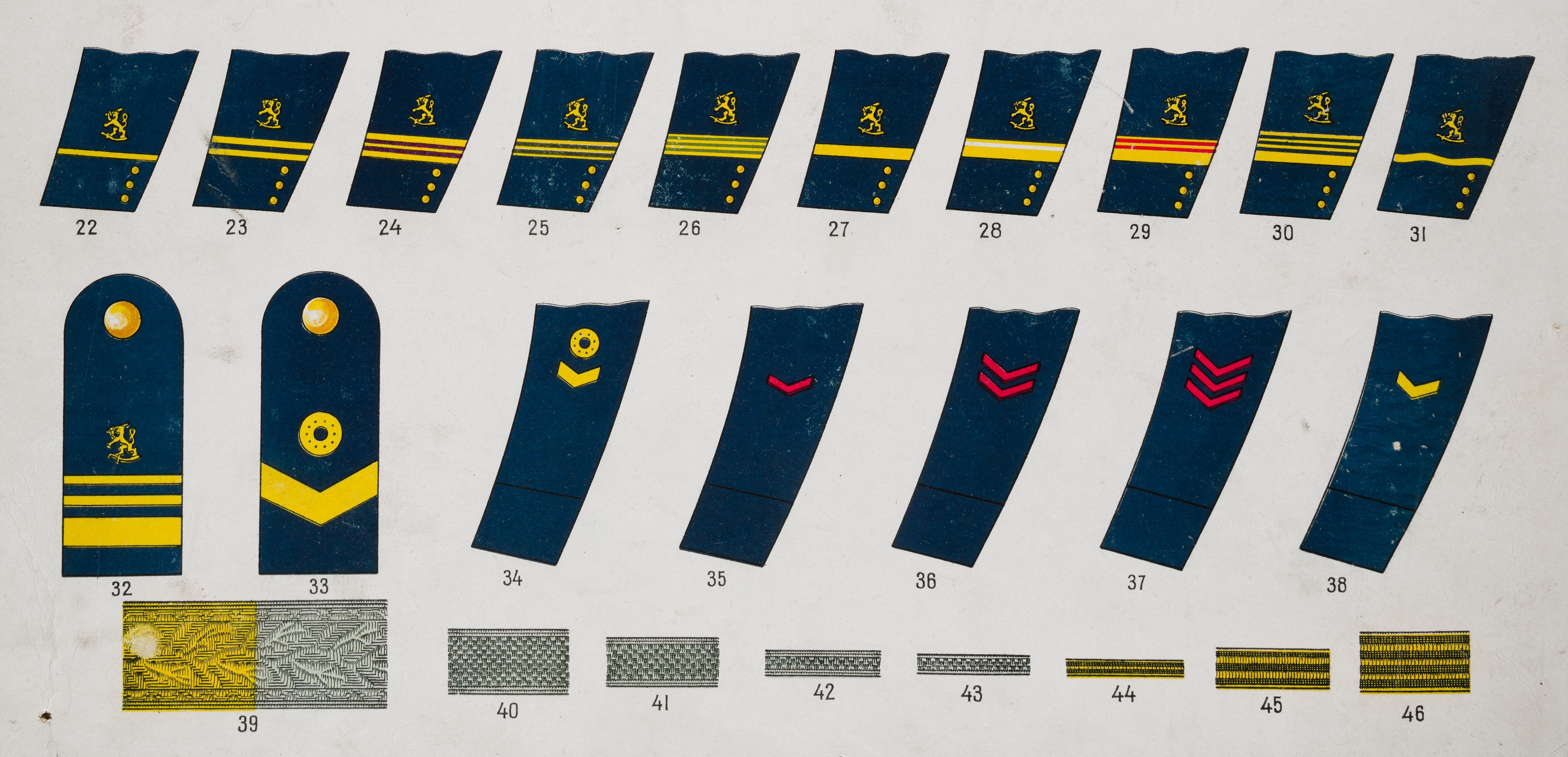
Finnish navy rank insignia model 1919.

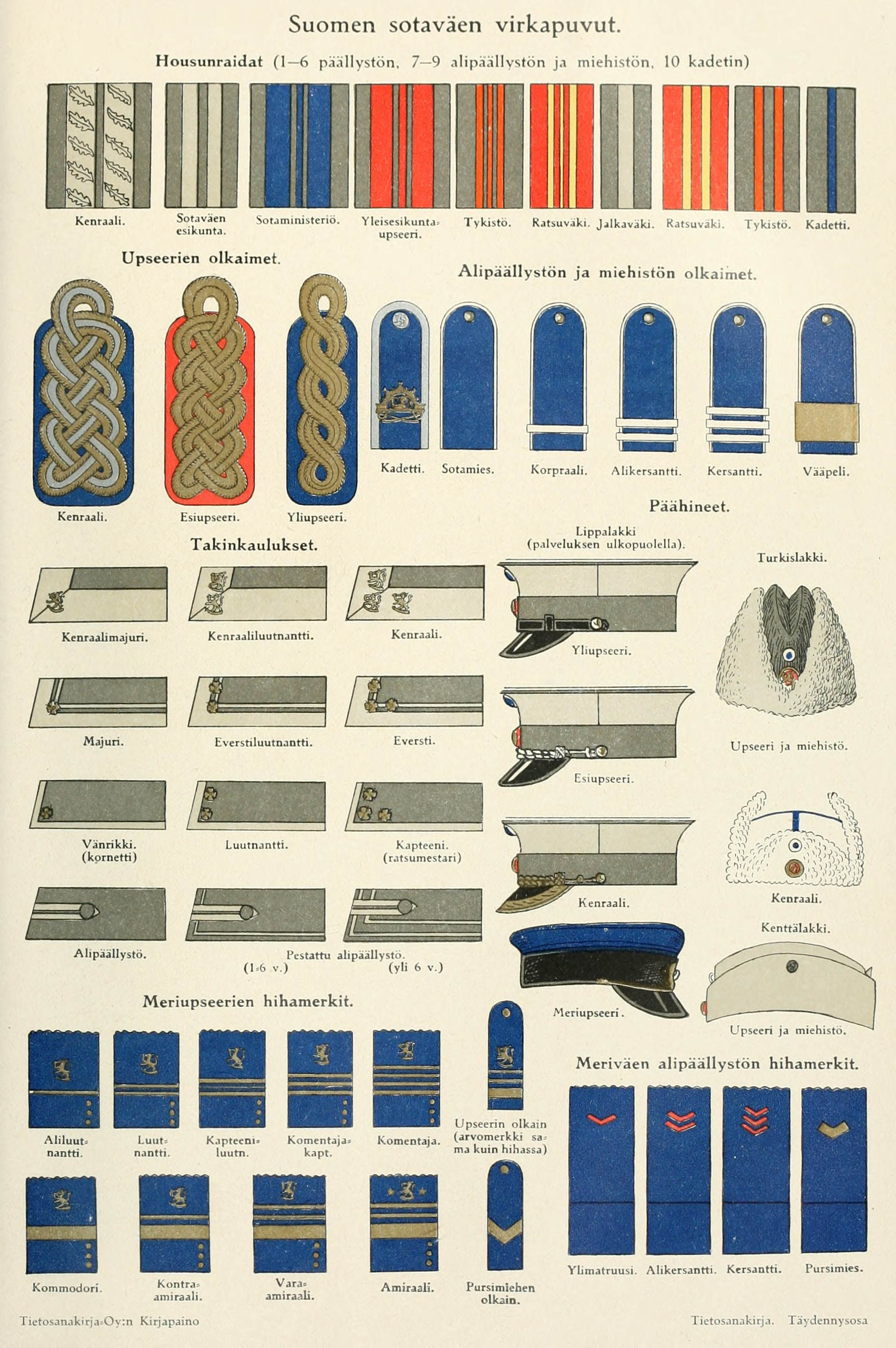
Finnish military rank insignia model 1922.

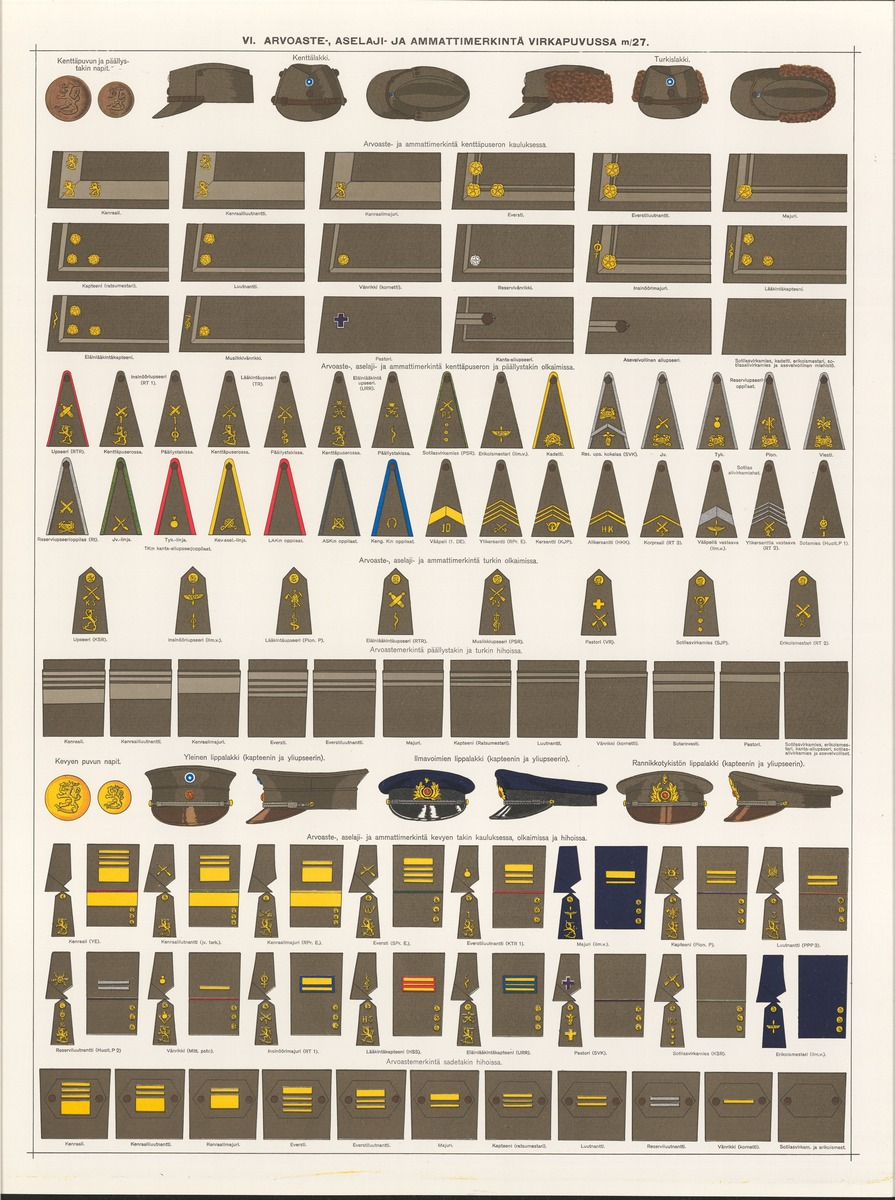
Finnish army and air force rank insignia model 1927.

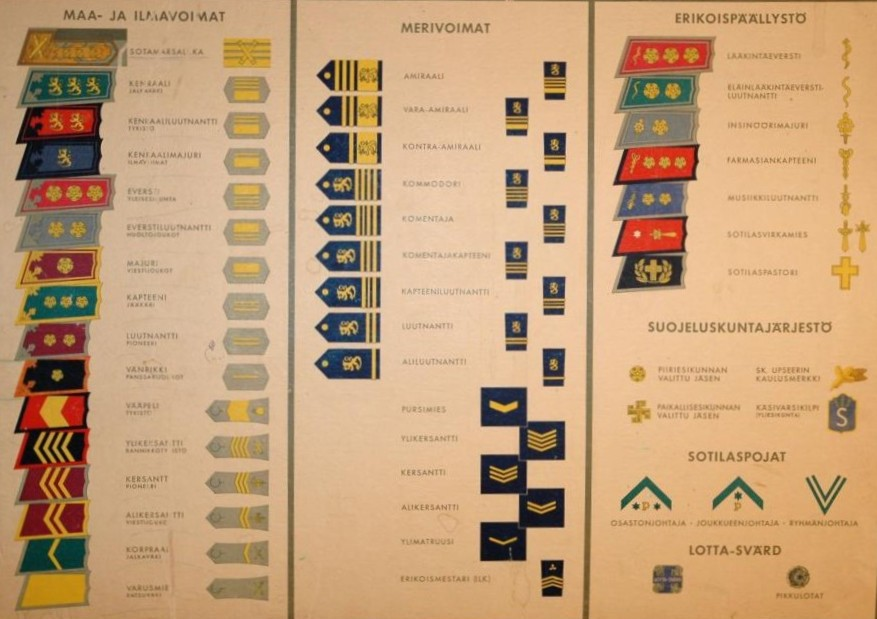
Finnish military rank insignia model 1936.

== Exceptions ==
=== General officers ===
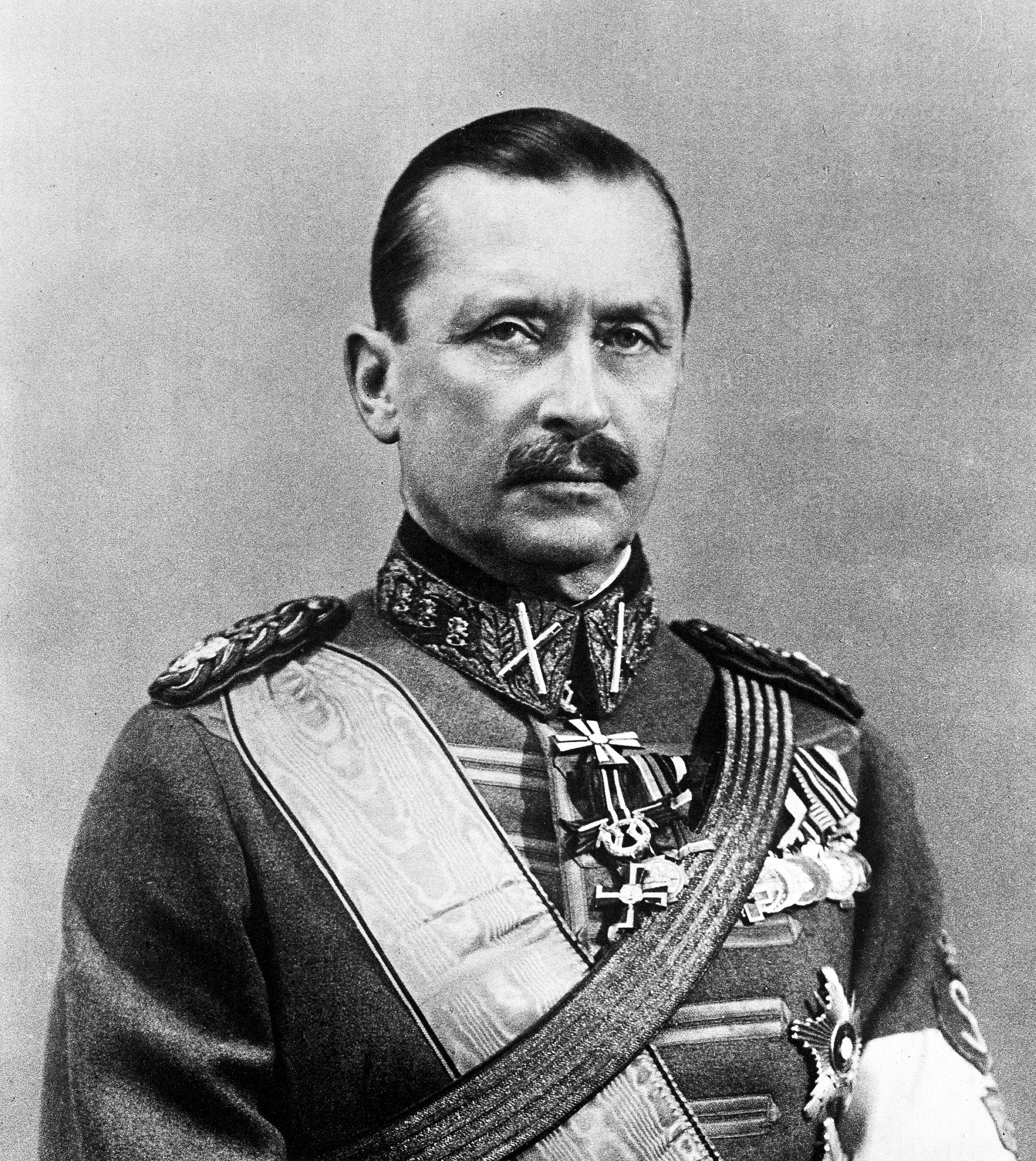
Carl Gustaf Emil Mannerheim, Marshal of Finland

Field marshal insignia consisting of the three heraldic lions of a full general and crossed marshal's batons

The ranks of field marshal (sotamarsalkka) and Marshal of Finland (Suomen marsalkka) were bestowed on Carl Gustaf Emil Mannerheim in 1933 and 1942, respectively. These are officially not military ranks but honorific titles, but were used like military ranks senior to the rank of general. The insignia used was a general's insignia with crossed marshal's batons.

The Finnish Field Marshal grade would be the equivalent to the NATO OF-10 rank.

All generals from brigadier general to general are addressed as "Sir/Ma'am General"("herra/rouva kenraali"), and similarly for admirals.

=== Historical honorary titles ===
The rank of general may, as a sign of special recognition, include a service branch: those historically used were general of infantry (jalkaväenkenraali), general of cavalry (ratsuväenkenraali) and general of artillery (tykistökenraali). These additions do not affect seniority. There are no living general officers with such recognition, the last one being General of Infantry Adolf Ehrnrooth (1905–2004).

Personnel who fought in the Finnish Jaegers of the German Army during World War I are often referred to as such, e.g. jääkärieversti "Jaeger colonel".

=== Reservists, military civil servants and specialist officers ===
Personnel serving in technical duties that hasn't completed any leadership training holds the position of Specialist (sotilasvirkamies i.e. military civil servant) at a class equal to their civilian education level. Their rank is equivalent to Staff Sergeant (Specialist 1st class - trade school), Lieutenant (Specialist 2nd class - Bachelor's degree) or First Lieutenant (Specialist 3rd class - Master's degree or above). Typical specialties include engineering, medicine and interpreters hired for UN peace keeping missions abroad. Military civil servants are rather rare as their position is likely to be filled by specialist officers i.e. personnel that has completed leadership training, has been commissioned and has the required civilian academic degree for the position.

Reservists may be promoted up to the rank of major both in special and normal officer ranks, if they have performed very well, have a training required for a duty that requires a higher rank and have been billeted for such duty. Reservists who are reserved for critical civilian occupation may be promoted if they are placed in a position of responsibility commensurate with their rank, and their civilian occupation has prepared them in duties relevant to total security concept so that they could be used in military duties suitable for their rank after they are no longer reserved for their current civilian position. In rare cases, reservists have been promoted to the rank of lieutenant colonel.

Chaplains serve in the ranks of chaplain (sotilaspastori), senior chaplain (kenttärovasti, literally, "field dean"), and field bishop (kenttäpiispa), corresponding to the ranks of captain, lieutenant colonel, and brigadier general, respectively. In addition, they have a personal rank into which they revert at the end of their clerical service in the Finnish Defence Force. Conscript chaplains and deacons serve in their personal rank.

=== Officer training ===
Conscripts who have passed the reserve officer course serve as officer candidates (upseerikokelas) at a rank equivalent to conscript sergeants but senior to them and below any career personnel. They are addressed rouva/herra kokelas or rouva/herra upseerikokelas. At the end of their conscript, they are promoted to second lieutenants (air force, army) or sub-lieutenants (navy).

Cadets (kadetti) are students at the National Defence University who have previously completed their reserve officer course during their military service and been admitted to the Bachelor's program in military science towards an officer career. Cadets are senior to second lieutenants. In addition, the cadets may hold a cadet NCO rank indicating their seniority within the Cadet Corps.

=== NCO ranks ===
The NCO ranks in the Finnish Defence Force are filled by conscripts, career NCOs and contractual military personnel at ranks from corporal to sergeant-major. Nowadays, career NCO sergeants wear a heraldic sword under their chevrons to distinguish them from conscript and contractual sergeants.

The contractual military personnel (sopimussotilaat) usually serves in their reserve ranks. Until 2007, reserve officers served in the rank of staff sergeant. This practice has now been abolished and nowadays reserve officers use their reserve rank. After discharge from the military, both career NCOs and contractual military personnel revert to their personal reserve ranks. The conscripts may hold the NCO rank of officer cadet, sergeant, officer student, or corporal. Reserve personnel may hold any NCO rank.

=== Special roles within units ===
There are some positions, which resemble military ranks in their name, but are not. The position of the company first sergeant (or other unit such as battery in artillery) is called komppanian vääpeli "company sergeant-major" or "first sergeant". In past times it was the position of the unit's most senior career NCO, but nowadays the post is held often by someone from sergeant up to senior lieutenant in training units, or by a conscript NCO (alikersantti, kersantti etc.) in mobilized units. Another example is komendantti, which is not a rank but a security/executive officer position in a brigade. While the rank of komentaja is found in the navy, in general use it refers to a commander of a battalion or a larger unit.

=== Career rank and file personnel ===
The rank of sotilasammattihenkilö "military professional" is reserved for non-combat trained professionals serving within the FDF in non-leadership roles such as those of social media assistant, photographer, or truck driver. Their rank insignia is a single heraldic sword and they rank above conscripts and below all other paid personnel.

=== Privates ===
Sotamies is the generic rank for private, however the rank of sotamies, as such, is no longer used in any service branch. The rank is always given the name specific to the service branch:

- Jaeger (jääkäri) in the infantry (including mortar personnel, who may be subordinated to infantry units)
- Signalman (viestimies) in the signals corps
- Armourman (panssarimies) in tank units
- Armoured Jaeger (panssarijääkäri) in mechanized infantry (including mechanized mortar unit's privates)
- Driver (autosotamies) in the transport corps
- Gunner (tykkimies) in the anti-aircraft corps, field artillery and coastal units of the navy
- Missileman (ohjusmies) in anti-aircraft surface-to-air missile units such as Helsinki Air Defence Regiment
- NBC private (suojelumies) in NBC defence units
- Engineer (pioneeri) in the engineers
- Airman (lentosotamies) in the air force
- Seaman (matruusi) in the navy
- Coastal jaeger (rannikkojääkäri) in certain units of the Nyland Brigade (Uudenmaan prikaati)
- Dragoon (rakuuna) in the Dragoon Squadron of Army Warfare School (Rakuunaeskadroona/Maasotakoulu) - This squadron was disbanded in December 2016
- Cavalryman (ratsumies) in the Häme Regiment (Hämeen rykmentti) – This regiment was disbanded in December 2014.
- Guard jaeger (kaartinjääkäri) in Guard Jaeger Regiment (Kaartin jääkärirykmentti)
- Border jaeger (rajajääkäri) in the border guards (conscript rank, enlisted border guard personnel are NCOs in ranks of border guard (nuorempi rajavartija, sergeant), senior border guard (vanhempi rajavartija, between staff sergeant and sergeant first class), border guard sergeant (ylirajavartija, between sergeant first class and master sergeant) and border guard master sergeant (rajavartiomestari).)

Roughly 10 percent of all privates are promoted to the rank of lance corporal (Korpraali) during their service. In comparison, non-commissioned officer students (Aliupseerioppilas) hold either the permanent rank of private or lance corporal and rank accordingly. The rank of alokas is used to denote privates in basic training. The recruit, alokas is a new private, who has not been trained enough to have given a military oath or affirmation. After giving an oath or affirmation, the private soldier is no longer called alokas but will be promoted to their private-level military rank corresponding to their service branch, e.g. tykkimies.

Paratroop jaeger (laskuvarjojääkäri) and Special jaeger (erikoisjääkäri) in Utti Jaeger Regiment (Utin jääkärirykmentti) and Special border jaeger (erikoisrajajääkäri) in Special Border Jaeger Company of Border and Coast Guard School (Raja- ja merivartiokoulu) are not ranks, but specializations, where NCO training is given and thus each graduate is at minimum alikersantti.

Historically, the rank of sotamies was used in generic infantry units, while the rank of jaeger was used in specific jaeger battalions, which derived their traditions from the Jäger Movement.
