= Alikersantti =

Finnish military rank

Alikersantti Undersergeant (Swedish)
- Army Navy
- Country: Finland (Sweden)
- Service branch: Army; Navy
- Next higher rank: Kersantti (Sergeant)
- Next lower rank: Korpraali (Korpral)

Alikersantti (Swedish: Undersergeant) is the lowest Finnish non-commissioned officer military rank. Alikersantti is one rank above a Korpraali (Lance-Corporal) and one below a Kersantti (Sergeant). A holder of this rank is typically a section leader, assistant section leader, gun section leader or a fighting vehicle commander.

== Obtaining the rank ==
Conscripts are first given basic military training for six weeks. About 30% are selected for NCO training (aliupseerikoulu or AUK), which lasts 12 weeks. Most alikersanttis are posted to companies for section leader duty. This is the most common conscript leader rank. Additionally, in many specialist branches with a 12-month service the rank is given automatically and the alikersantti is not given a command, e.g. assistant mechanic (apumekaanikko) in the Air Force. As all NCO's, alikersantti is addressed as herra alikersantti, which translates as Sir.

== See also ==
- Finnish military ranks
