= Field marshal (Finland) =

Honorary Finnish military rank

Sotamarsalkka
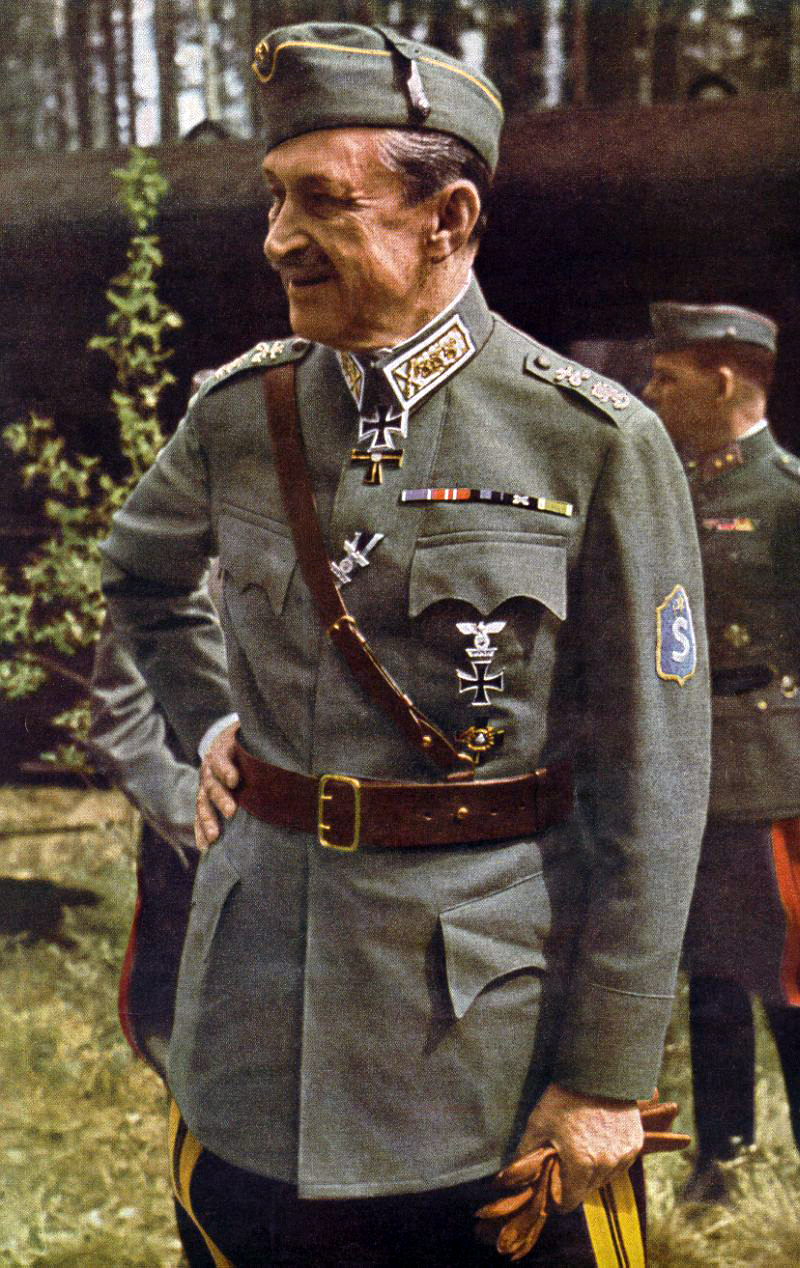
- C. G. E. Mannerheim wearing the rank insignia of sotamarsalkka, Finnish field marshal, as established for the m/36 service uniform.

- Rank insignia image of sotamarsalkka
- Country: Finland
- Rank: Field marshal
- NATO rank code: OF-10
- Formation: 19 May 1933
- Next higher rank: None
- Next lower rank: General; Admiral

In the Finnish Defence Forces, Field Marshal (Finnish: sotamarsalkka, lit. 'War Marshal', Swedish: fältmarskalk) is officially not an active military rank but an honorary rank that can be bestowed upon 'especially distinguished generals'. So far the only holder of this title has been Baron Carl Gustaf Emil Mannerheim, then Chairman of the Defence Council, who received it on 19 May 1933 by the decision of the State Council. Baron Gustaf Mannerheim (1867–1951) served as Regent (1918–1919) and President of the Republic (1944–1946).

Lieutenant General Mannerheim had commanded the White Army in the Finnish Civil War in 1918, and his promotion to field marshal had already been suggested in 1928, the 10th anniversary of the end of the War. Back then the proposal was rejected as 'too warlike'–and there was also fears that such promotion would prove politically controversial–but Mannerheim was nevertheless given an unofficial marshal's baton by the Civil War's White veterans. Five years later the political climate was more favourable, and the State Council decided to bestow Mannerheim the rank of field marshal. The decision was kept in secret, and came as a pleasant surprise to Mannerheim. He observed "In a little ultrademocratic country it could seem quite pretentious to indulge in the luxury of a field marshal", but also admitted that it was "not so frightful when the marshal costs the state nothing".

It is not known why field marshal never became a substantive rank rather than honorary one, but this distinction caused Mannerheim some consternation at the time. He had to pay a substantial stamp duty of 4,000 Finnish marks. Mannerheim's secretary at the Defence Council, the then Lieutenant Colonel Aksel Airo, tried to make the Defence Forces or Ministry of Defence foot the bill. It is customary that the organization that has originally put a person forward for the title, pays the stamp duty that comes with it. But in this case no such payer could be found and finally Airo had to present the bill to Mannerheim, who commented wryly: "It's a good job they haven't made me a more important man." Mannerheim was also initially concerned that as field marshal was not an official rank, he was no longer in the Defence Forces service, but Mannerheim was then assured that he remained in the Finnish Army officer lists as a general of cavalry (ratsuväenkenraali, his substantive rank since 1918).

Mannerheim received the field marshal's title three days after the 15th anniversary of the end of the Civil War, choosing not to receive the title on the anniversary on 16 May, because he did not want to aggravate the wounds of the War. On this occasion Mannerheim was also given a new, official marshal's baton, but he still preferred to use the old, unofficial one, because it was lighter.

In practice, field marshal was treated like a military rank. Mannerheim, in co-operation with artist and author Aarno Karimo, designed a new rank insignia consisting of the three heraldic lions of a full general and crossed marshal's batons.

On Mannerheim's 75th birthday, 4 June 1942, he was bestowed the title of Marshal of Finland (Finnish: Suomen marsalkka, Swedish: Marskalk av Finland) that has been specially created for him, although it was fully symbolic title and his rank insignia remained the same.

At the time when Finland was under Swedish rule (before the War of Finland in 1808–1809), a number of Finnish-born men reached the corresponding rank of Fältmarskalk.
