= Vänrikki =

Military rank in the Finnish Defence Forces

- Country: Finland
- Next higher rank: Luutnantti
- Next lower rank: Sotilasmestari

Vänrikki (Finnish: [ˈʋænrikːi]) (Second lieutenant, Swedish: Fänrik), from the German Fähnrich, is a Finnish commissioned officer rank (OF1). A typical assignment for a professional vänrikki is as junior instructor of recruits. A vänrikki is senior to a Sotilasmestari (sergeant-major) and junior to a Luutnantti (lieutenant).

== Finland ==
The rank vänrikki is used in active service by reserve officers who remain in service as for 6-to-12-months-long volunteer contract period. In addition, it is the lowest reserve officer rank.

=== Conscript officer ===
The rank has been mainly a reserve rank. The future conscript officers are selected from the whole pool of conscripts. After a basic training of two months, a portion of the conscripts are selected for NCO training. After 2 months of NCO training, the most suitable are selected for reserve officer training and promoted to officer students. The 3½-month-long reserve officers training usually takes place in the Reserve Officer School, and afterwards, the candidates are promoted to officer cadets (Finnish: upseerikokelas). They serve the remaining 5½ months of their conscription practicing as platoon commanders as well as training other conscripts. Finally, successful officer cadets are discharged with the rank of vänrikki. In the reserve, reserve officers may be promoted up to majuri (Major), although there have been extraordinarily promotions to everstiluutnantti (Lieutenant Colonel). The Navy equivalent rank is aliluutnantti (Sub-Lieutenant).

If mobilization is effected, officers in the reserve fill most junior officer duties of the war-time Finnish army. Especially, most platoon and company commander positions and junior staff officer duties are filled with reservists.

=== Professional officer ===
The National Defence College accepts both reserve officers and reserve NCOs. Those cadets who did not receive reserve officer training during their conscription are usually promoted to the personal rank of vänrikki during their studies. However, upon graduation, professional officers are promoted to luutnantti.

During the early 21st century, the National Defence College also had a one-year program to commission professional officers with the rank of vänrikki and a fixed service term of five years. The rank is the lowest commissioned officer rank.

Formerly a school called Maanpuolustusopisto (MpO) had vänrikki as the rank given to new graduates. These officers were known as opistoupseeri (usually translated "Warrant Officer"), and could be promoted up to yliluutnantti, senior lieutenant, (company vice-commander), and later, to kapteeni (company commander). The opisto level ceased to exist in Finland (other schools were redefined as ammattikorkeakoulu) in the end of 1990's. However, in the military, the MpO was decommissioned. All officers are now trained by the National Defence College. Any existing MpO graduates may obtain further education to upgrade their degree to a university degree.

=== Extraordinary ===
Simo Häyhä, believed to have the highest number of sniper kills in any major war, was extraordinarily promoted to vänrikki, from alikersantti (Corporal), personally by Marshal Gustaf Mannerheim.

== See also ==
- Finnish military ranks
