= Kenraalimajuri =

Officer's rank in Finland

- Country: Finland
- NATO rank code: OF-7
- Next higher rank: Kenraaliluutnantti
- Next lower rank: Prikaatikenraali

Kenraalimajuri (Major General) is an officer's rank in Finland, immediately above prikaatikenraali (Brigadier General) and below kenraaliluutnantti (Lieutenant General). In Finland, the rank is translated as major general. Finnish Defence Forces rank of kenraalimajuri is comparable to Ranks of NATO armies officers as OF-7. In Finland a kenraalimajuri typically commands a corps or army chief of staff. The commander of Finnish Air Force is a kenraalimajuri. There are also several special tasks for kenraalimajuri or senior.

== History and related ranks ==
=== Origin ===
The rank was originally a pure staff officers' rank used for those who served a general. Those staff servants were named Sergeant Major Generals. The sergeant part was later dropped.

== See also ==
- Finnish military ranks
