= General (Finland) =

Highest officer's rank in Finland

General Kenraali
- Insignia in the Finnish Army

- Insignia in the Finnish Air Force

- Insignia as part of the M05 field uniform
- Country: Finland
- Service branch: Finnish Army; Finnish Air Force
- Rank group: General officer
- NATO rank code: OF-9
- Next higher rank: Field marshal
- Next lower rank: Kenraaliluutnantti

General (Finnish: Kenraali) is the highest officer's rank in Finland. It is held exclusively by the Chief of Defence during peacetime. General is comparable to ranks of NATO armies officers as OF-9. The next junior rank is kenraaliluutnantti (lieutenant-general).

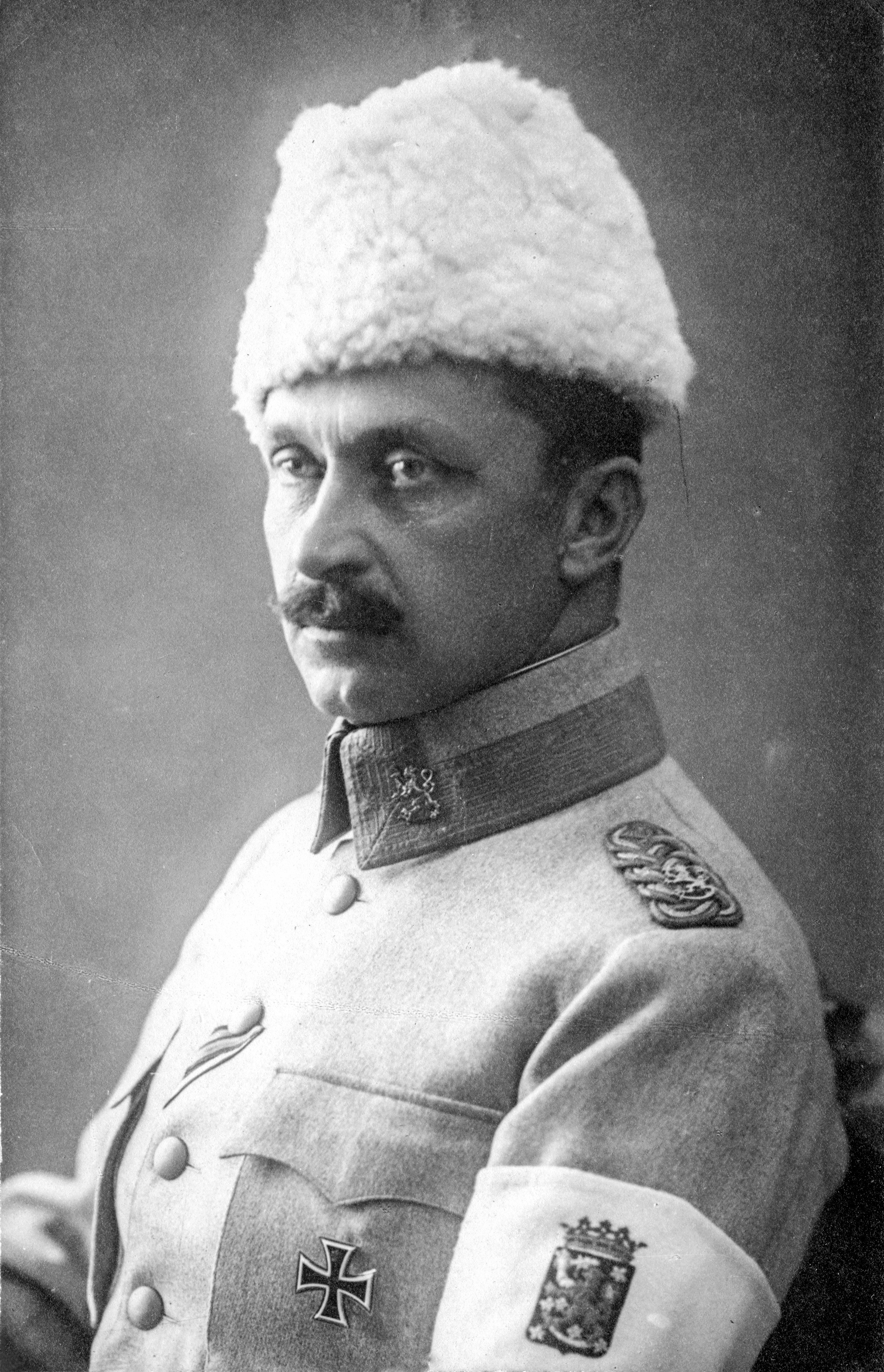
General C. G. E. Mannerheim in 1918 during the Finnish Civil War

Historically, a general's branch of service could be indicated in the rank. So far Finland has had seventeen of jalkaväenkenraali (general of infantry), a few of jääkärikenraali (Jägergeneral), two of ratsuväenkenraali (general of cavalry) and one tykistönkenraali (general of artillery). Carl Gustaf Emil Mannerheim himself was the other one of the two generals of cavalry before his promotion to field marshal.

== See also ==
- Field marshal (Finland)
- Finnish military ranks
