= Kenraaliluutnantti =

Military rank in the Finnish Defence Forces

- Country: Finland
- NATO rank code: OF-8
- Next higher rank: Kenraali
- Next lower rank: Kenraalimajuri

Kenraaliluutnantti (Lieutenant General) is an officer's rank in Finland, immediately above Kenraalimajuri (Major General) and below Kenraali (General). In Finland, the rank is translated as lieutenant general. Finnish Defence Forces rank of kenraaliluutnantti is comparable to Ranks of NATO armies officers as OF-8. A kenraaliluutnantti is usually a commander of army or chief of staff of Finnish Defence Forces.

== History and related ranks ==
=== Origin ===
A King/Queen was also a captain, and when sending their lieutenant (literally meaning 'place holder', i.e. in lieu or on behalf of someone) as their representative, the lieutenant was titled general lieutenant to distinguish him from the lieutenants of ordinary captains.

== See also ==
- Finnish military ranks
