= Luutnantti =

Military rank in the Finnish Defence Forces

- Army Navy
- Country: Finland
- Next higher rank: Yliluutnantti
- Next lower rank: Vänrikki

Luutnantti (from French lieutenant originally meaning second-in-command) is a Finnish military rank.

== Finland ==
The Finnish Army is bilingual; the rank is known in Swedish as Löjtnant and Finnish as Luutnantti.

One year of conscript training as officer cadet and a three-year degree of Bachelor of Military Science (Finnish: sotatieteiden kandidaatti) at National Defence University. After 3-4 years and further studies, they can be promoted to yliluutnantti/premiärlöjtnant. Reservists may be promoted to lieutenants after a specified period of successful reservist training.

== See also ==
- Finnish military ranks
