= Comparative officer ranks of the European Gendarmerie Force =

Rank comparison chart of all members of the European Gendarmerie Force.

== Full members ==
NATO code	OF-10	OF-9	OF-8		OF-7	OF-6	OF-5	OF-4	OF-3	OF-2		OF-1
(France) French Gendarmerie
(France) French Gendarmerie		Général d'armée	Général de corps d'armée		Général de division	Général de brigade	Colonel	Lieutenant-Colonel	Chef d'Escadron	Capitaine		Lieutenant	Sous-Lieutenant
Italian Carabinieri
Italian Carabinieri		Comandante generale dell'arma dei carabinieri	Vicecomandante generale dell'arma dei carabinieri	Generale di corpo d'armata	Generale di divisione	Generale di brigata	Colonnello	Tenente colonnello	Maggiore	Primo capitano	Capitano	Tenente	Sottotenente
Lithuanian Public Security Service
Lithuanian Public Security Service						Generolas	Pulkininkas	Pulkininkas leitenantas	Majoras	Kapitonas		Vyresnysis leitenantas	Leitenantas
Royal Marechaussee
Royal Marechaussee			Luitenant-generaal		Generaal-majoor	Brigade-generaal	Kolonel	Luitenant-kolonel	Majoor	Kapitein		Eerste-luitenant	Tweede-luitenant
Żandarmeria wojskowa
Żandarmeria wojskowa						Generał brygady	Pułkownik	Podpułkownik	Major	Kapitan		Porucznik	Podporucznik
National Republican Guard
National Republican Guard			Tenente-general; Comandante-general	Tenente-general	Major-general		Coronel	Tenente-coronel	Major	Capitão		Tenente	Alferes
(Romania) Romanian Gendarmerie
(Romania) Romanian Gendarmerie	Mareșal	General	General-locotenent		General-maior	General de brigadă	Colonel	Locotenent-colonel	Maior	Căpitan		Locotenent	Sublocotenent
(Spain) Spanish Civil Guard
(Spain) Spanish Civil Guard			Teniente general		General de división	General de brigada	Coronel	Teniente coronel	Comandante	Capitán		Teniente	Alférez
NATO code	OF-10	OF-9	OF-8		OF-7	OF-6	OF-5	OF-4	OF-3	OF-2		OF-1

== Partners ==
NATO code	OF-10	OF-9	OF-8	OF-7	OF-6	OF-5	OF-4	OF-3	OF-2	OF-1
(Finland) Finnish Border Guard
(Finland) Finnish Border Guard		Kenraali/ Amiraali	Kenraaliluutnantti/ Vara-amiraali	Kenraalimajuri/ Kontra-amiraali	Prikaatikenraali/ Lippueamiraali	Eversti/ Kommodori	Everstiluutnantti/ Komentaja	Majuri/ Komentajakapteeni	Kapteeni/ Kapteeniluutnantti	Yliluutnantti/ Yliluutnantti	Luutnantti/ Luutnantti	Vänrikki/ Aliluutnantti
(Finland) Finnish Border Guard		General/ Amiral	Generallöjtnant/ Viceamiral	Generalmajor/ Konteramiral	Brigadgeneral/ Flottiljamiral	Överste/ Kommodor	Överstelöjtnant/ Kommendör	Major/ Kommendörkapten	Kapten/ Kaptenlöjtnant	Premiärlöjtnant	Löjtnant	Fänrik/ Underlöjtnant

== Observers ==
Rank group	General / flag officers				Senior officers			Junior officers
Bulgarian Gendarmerie
Bulgarian Gendarmerie			Генерал-майор; General-mayor	Бригаден генерал Brigaden general	Комисар; Komisar	Главен инспектор Glaven inspektor	Старши инспектор Starshi inspektor	Инспектор I степен Inspektor I stepen	Инспектор II степен Inspektor II stepen		Инспектор III степен Inspektor III stepen
Moldovan Carabinieri
Moldovan Carabinieri					Colonel	Locotenent-colonel	Maior	Căpitan	Locotenent-major		Locotenent
Turkish Gendarmerie
Turkish Gendarmerie	Orgeneral	Korgeneral	Tümgeneral	Tuğgeneral	Albay	Yarbay	Binbaşı	Yüzbaşı	Üsteğmen	Teğmen	Asteğmen
National Guard of Ukraine
National Guard of Ukraine	Генерал; Heneral	Генерал-лейтенант; Heneral-leitenant	Генерал-майор; Heneral-maior	Бригадний генерал Bryhadnyi heneral	Полковник; Polkovnyk	Підполковник; Pidpolkovnyk	Майор; Maior	Капітан; Kapitan	Старший лейтенант Starshyi leitenant	Лейтенант; Leitenant	Молодший лейтенант Molodshyi leitenant
Rank group	General / flag officers				Senior officers			Junior officers

== See also ==
- Comparative enlisted ranks of the European Gendarmerie Force
- Comparative army officer ranks of the European Union
- Comparative navy officer ranks of the European Union
- Comparative air force officer ranks of the European Union
