= Comparative enlisted ranks of the European Gendarmerie Force =

Rank comparison chart of all members of the European Gendarmerie Force.

== Full members ==
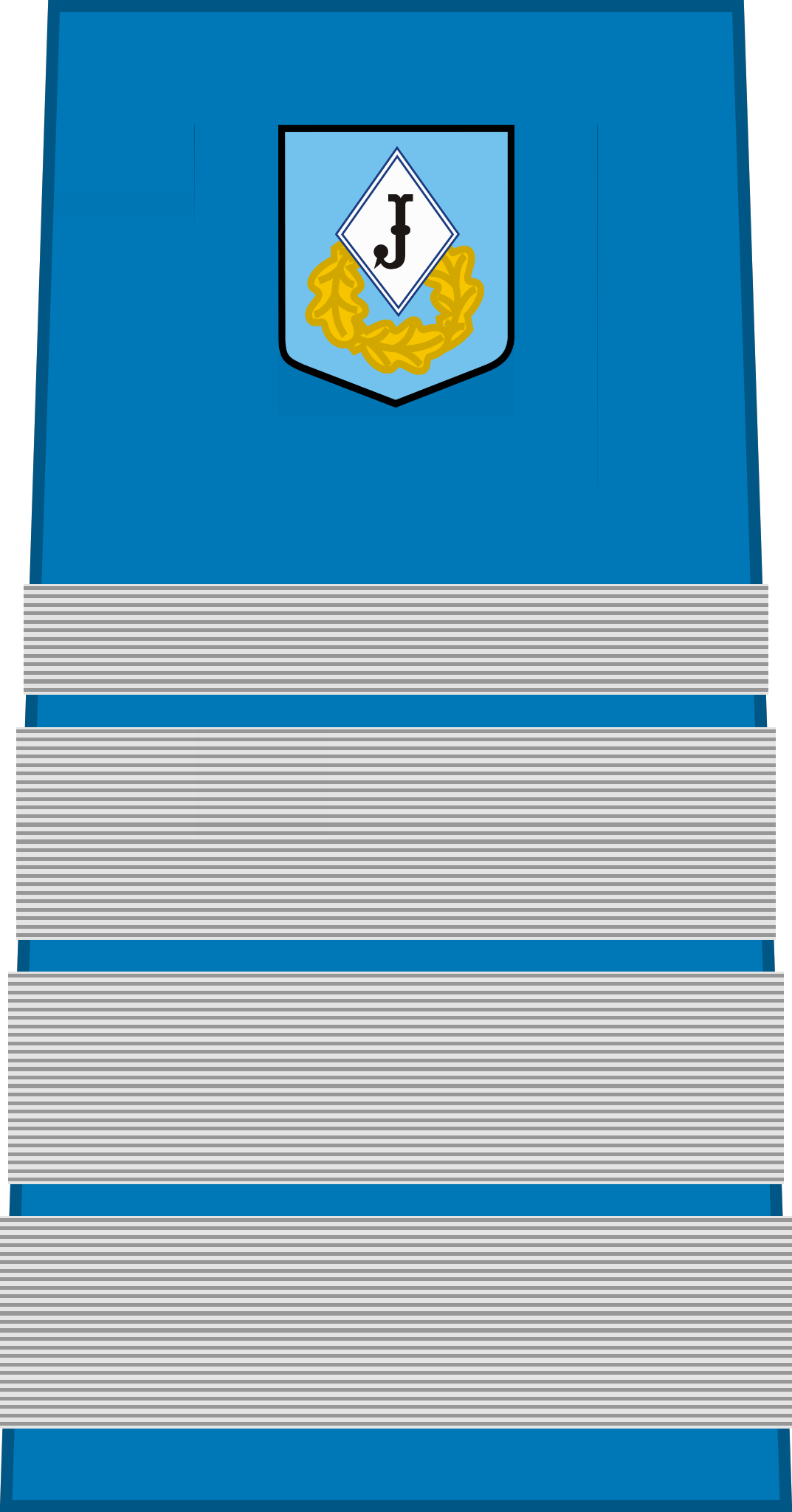
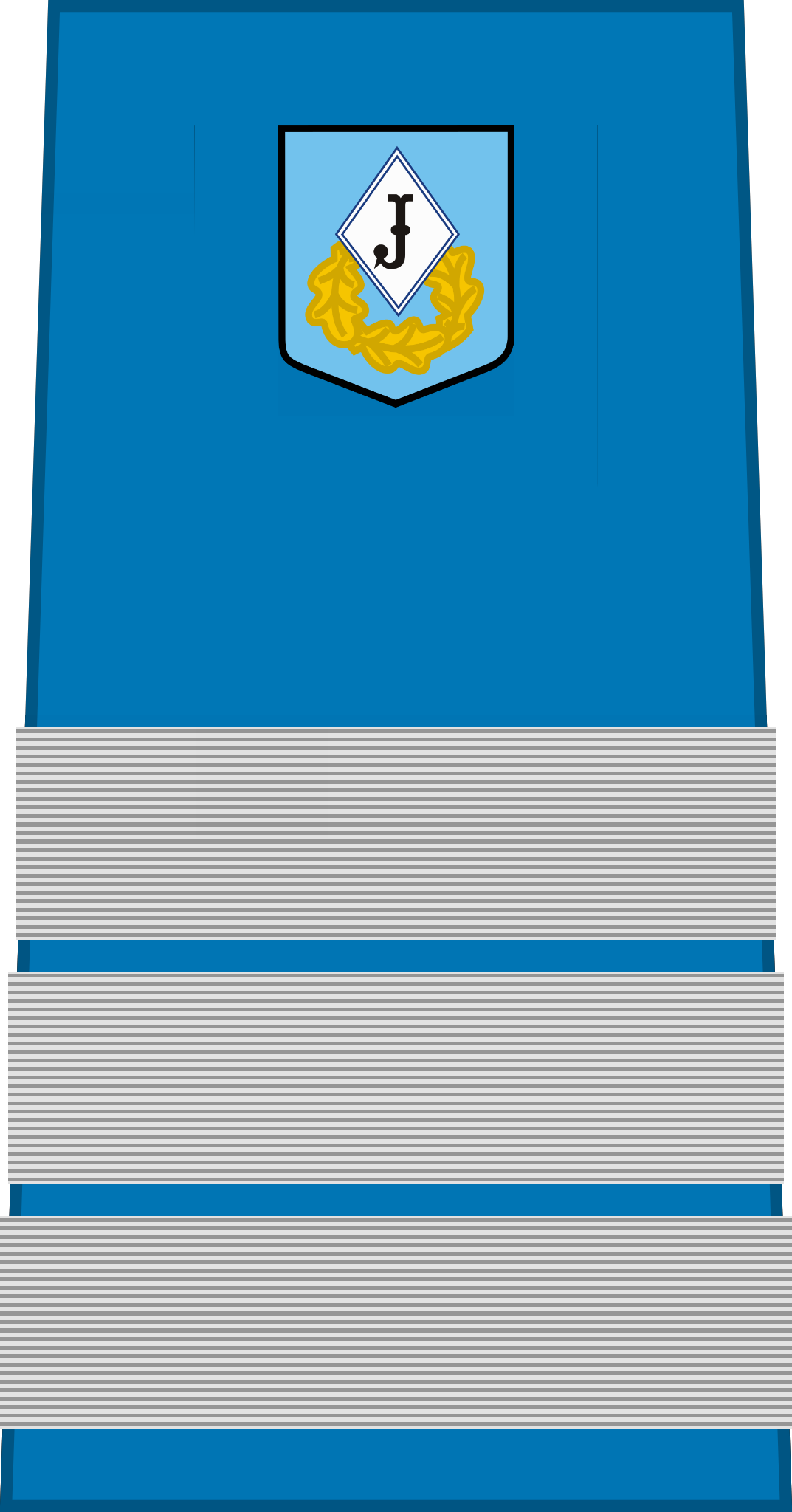
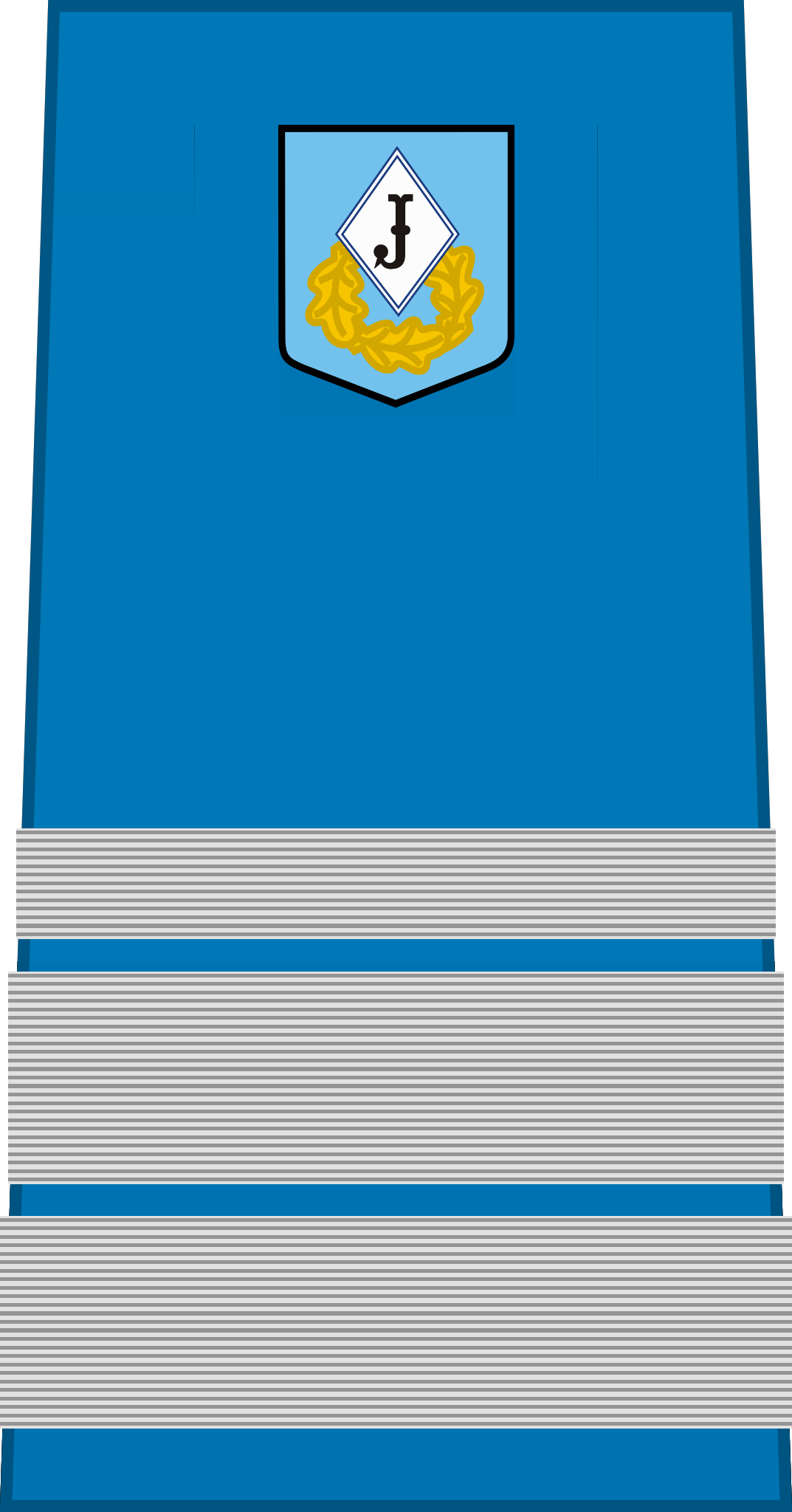
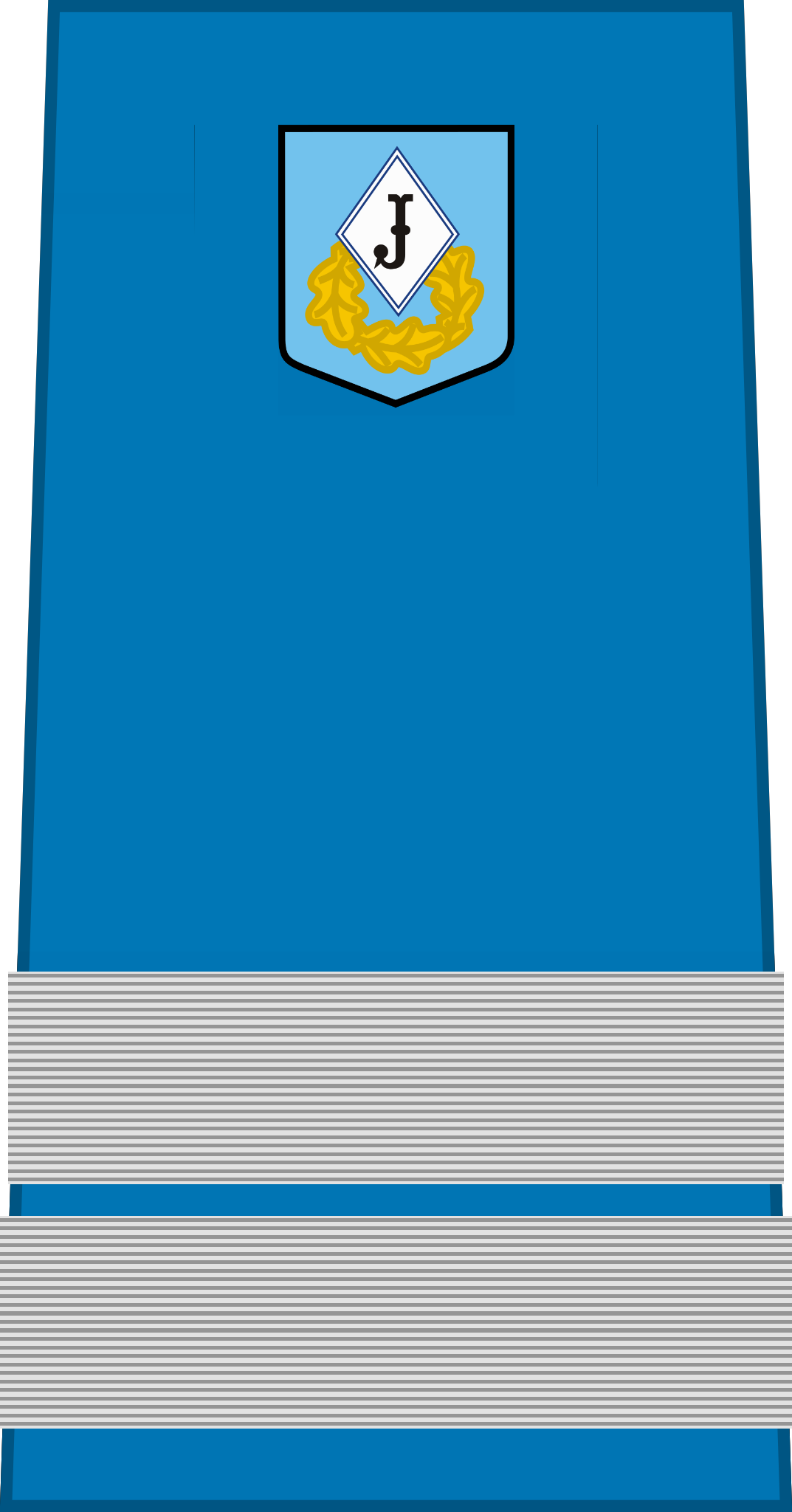
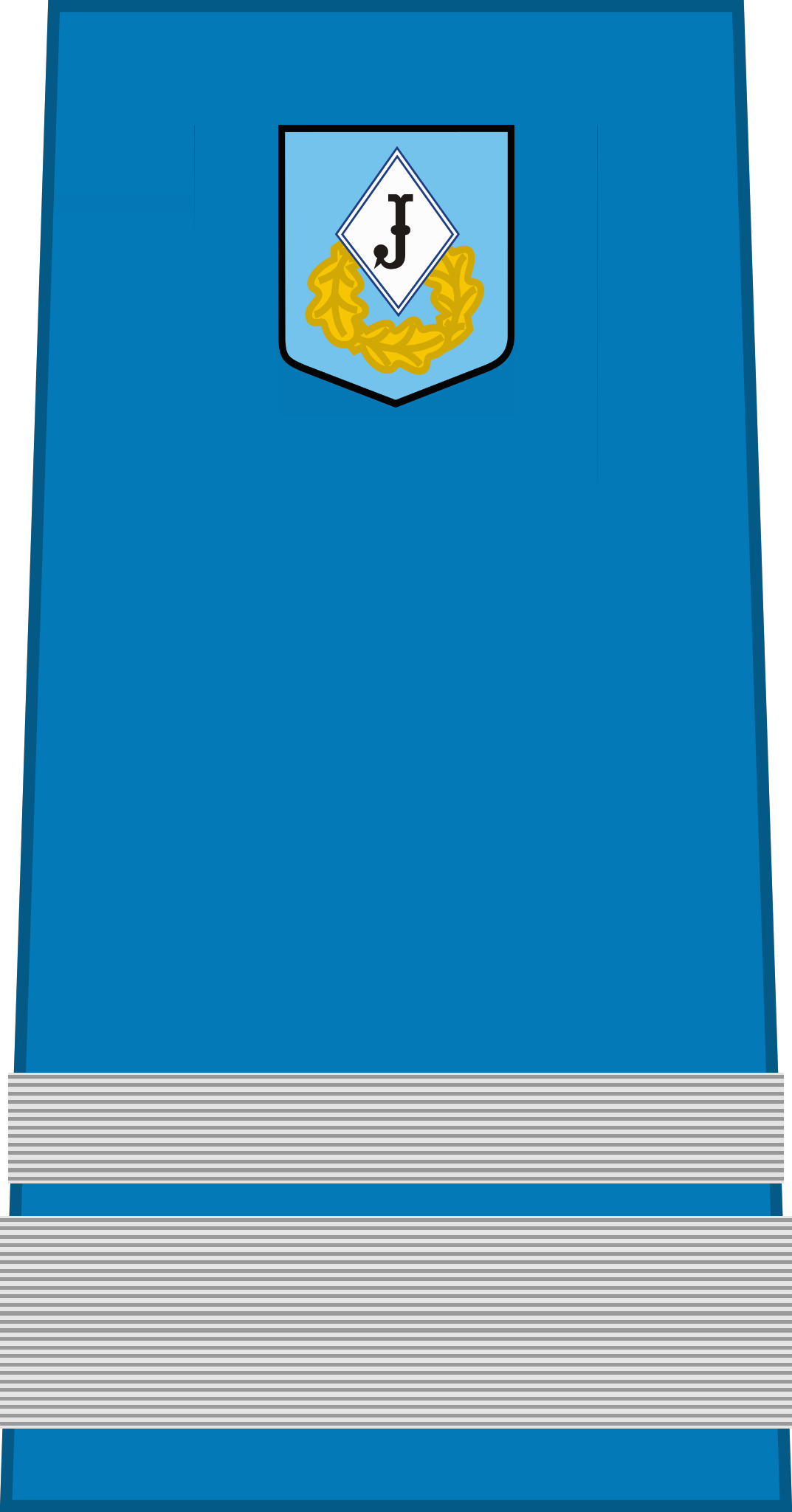
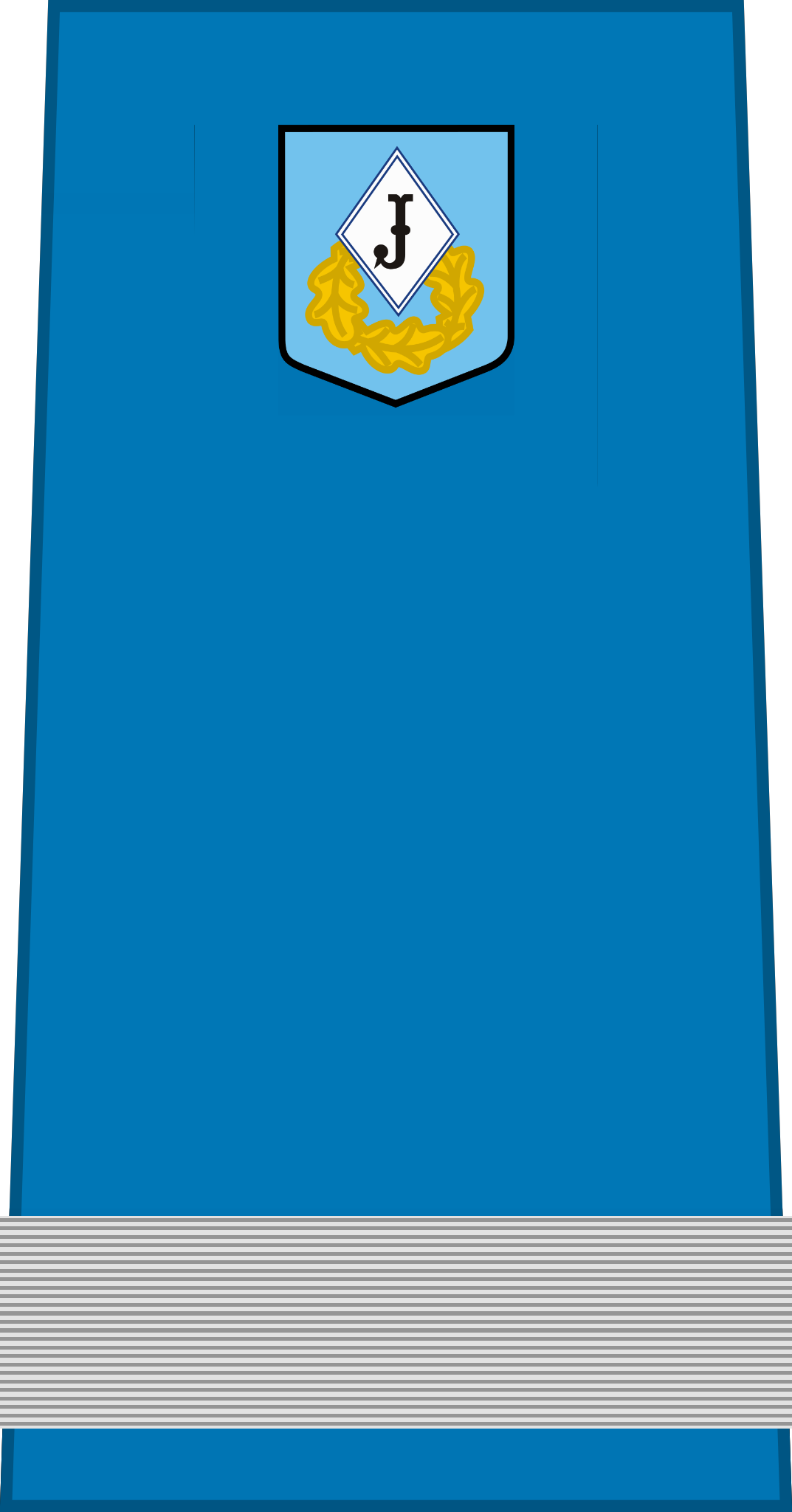
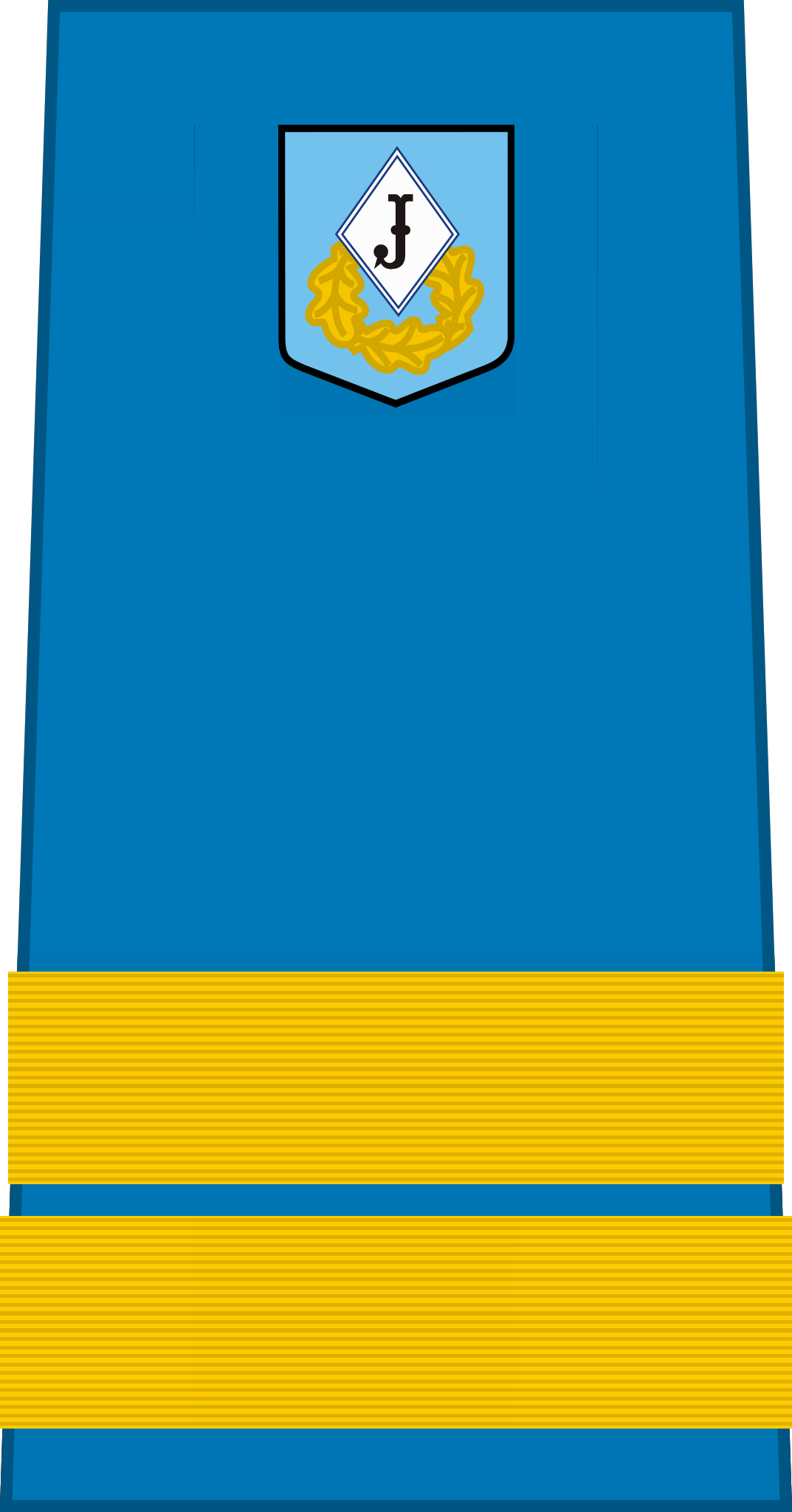
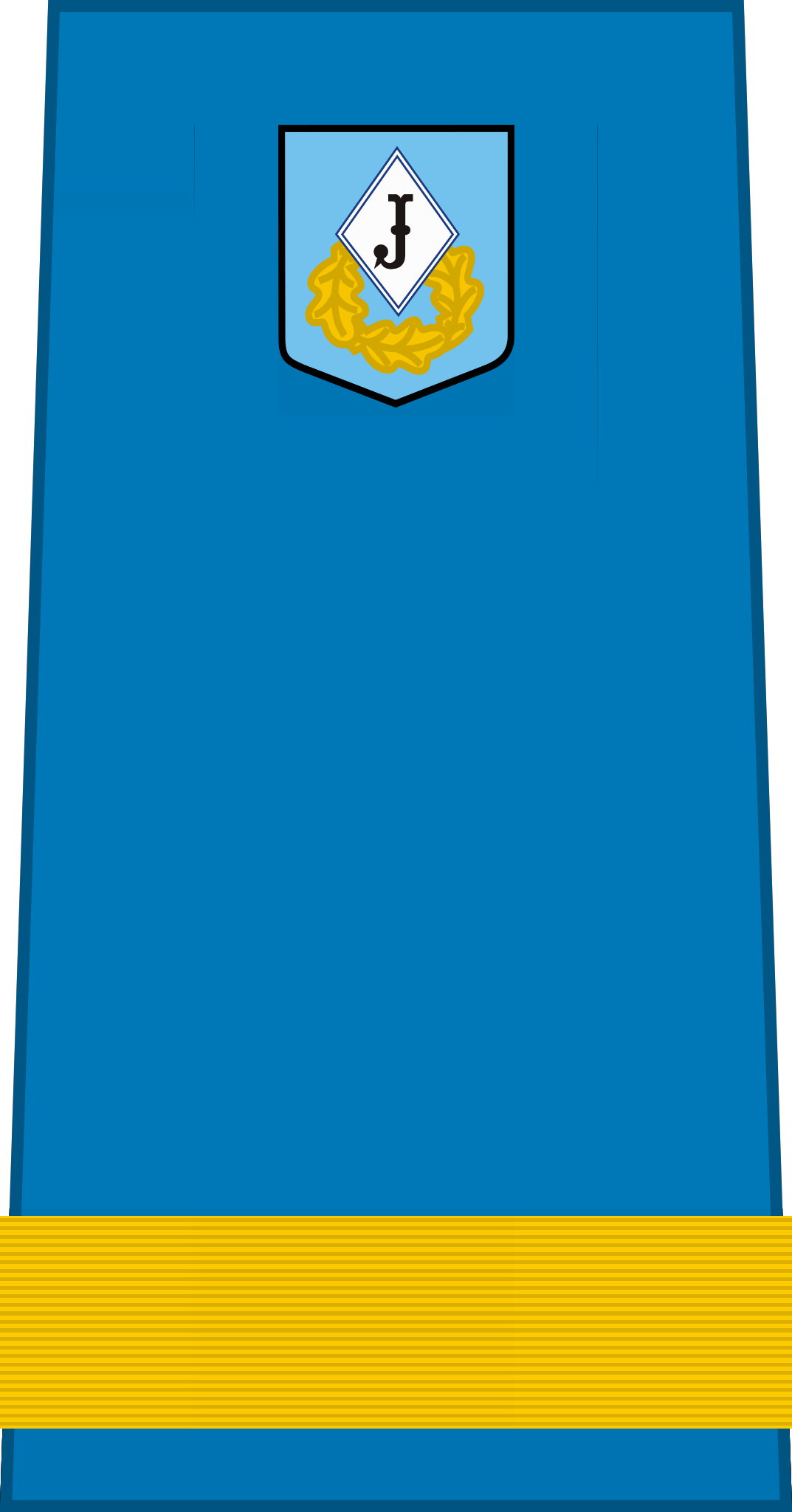
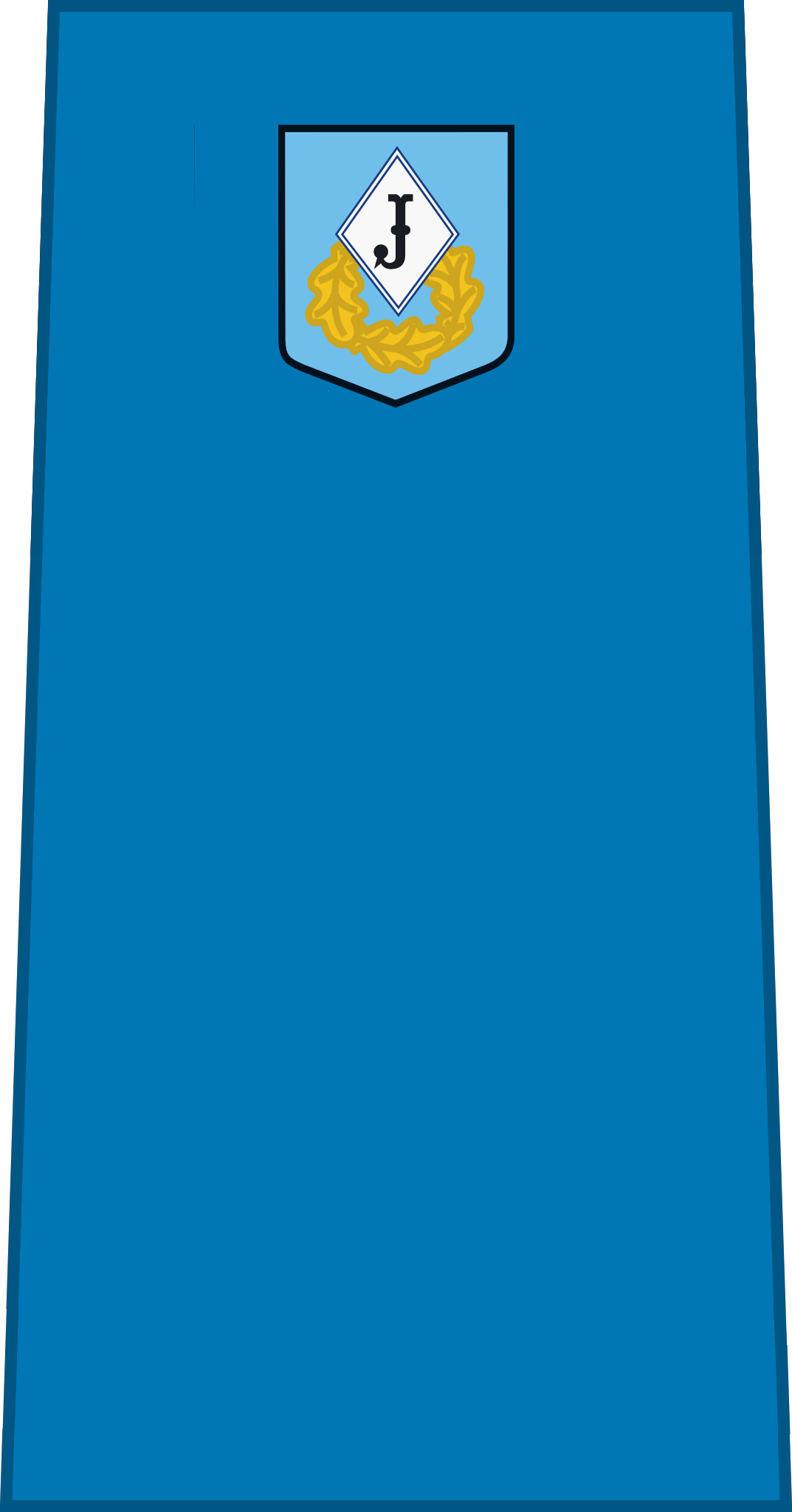
NATO code	OR-9				OR-8		OR-7		OR-6	OR-5			OR-4		OR-3		OR-2		OR-1
(France) French Gendarmerie
(France) French Gendarmerie	Major			Adjudant-chef	Adjudant				Maréchal-des-logis-chef	Gendarme	Gendarme sous contrat	Gendarme Adjoint Maréchal-des-logis	Gendarme Adjoint Brigadier Chef		Gendarme Adjoint Brigadier		Gendarme Adjoint première classe		Gendarme Adjoint
Italian Carabinieri													Appuntato scelto q.s. / Appuntato scelto / Appuntato / Carabiniere scelto / Carabiniere
Italian Carabinieri	Primo luogotenente c.s. s.u.p.s	Luogotenente s.u.p.s.	Primo Maresciallo	Maresciallo Capo	Maresciallo Ordinario	Maresciallo	Brigadiere capo q.s.	Brigadiere capo	Brigadiere	Vicebrigadiere			Appuntato scelto q.s. / Appuntato scelto / Appuntato / Carabiniere scelto / Carabiniere
Lithuanian Public Security Service
Lithuanian Public Security Service							Vyresnysis puskarininkis		Puskarininkis	Jaunesnysis puskarininkis			Grandinis
Royal Marechaussee
Royal Marechaussee	Adjudant-onderofficier						Opperwachtmeester		Wachtmeester der 1e klasse	Wachtmeester			Marechaussee der 1e klasse		Marechaussee der 2e klasse		Marechaussee der 3e klasse		Marechaussee der 4e klasse
Żandarmeria wojskowa
Żandarmeria wojskowa	Starszy chorąży sztabowy			Starszy chorąży	Chorąży				Młodszy chorąży	Starszy sierżant			Sierżant		Plutonowy	Starszy kapral	Kapral		Starszy szeregowy	Szeregowy
(Portugal) National Republican Guard
(Portugal) National Republican Guard	Sargento-mor			Sargento-chefe	Sargento-ajudante		Primeiro-sargento		Segundo-sargento	Furriel			Cabo-mor	Cabo-chefe	Cabo-de-curso		Cabo	Guarda principal	Guarda
(Romania) Romanian Gendarmerie
(Romania) Romanian Gendarmerie	Plutonier adjutant șef			Plutonier adjutant	Plutonier-major		Plutonier		Sergent-major	Sergent			Caporal		Fruntaș		Jandarm
(Spain) Spanish Civil Guard
(Spain) Spanish Civil Guard	Suboficial mayor			Subteniente	Brigada		Sargento primero		Sargento	Cabo mayor			Cabo primero		Cabo		Guardia Civil de Primera (Note: Rank in abeyance)		Guardia Civil
NATO code	OR-9				OR-8		OR-7		OR-6	OR-5			OR-4		OR-3		OR-2		OR-1

== Partners ==
Rank group	Senior NCOs					Junior NCOs		Enlisted
(Finland) Finnish Border Guard
(Finland) Finnish Border Guard	Sotilasmestari	Ylivääpeli/ Ylipursimies	Vääpeli/ Pursimies	Ylikersantti	Kersantti	Alikersantti	Korpraali/ Ylimatruusi	Sotamies
(Finland) Finnish Border Guard	Militärmästare	Överfältväbel/ Överbåtsman	Fältväbel/ Båtsman	Översergeant	Sergeant	Undersergeant	Korpral/ Övermatros	Soldat

== Observers ==
Rank group	Senior NCOs							Junior NCOs				Enlisted
Bulgarian Gendarmerie
Bulgarian Gendarmerie				Командир на отделение Komandir na otdelenie	Полицай I степен Politsaĭ I stepen	Полицай II степен Politsaĭ II stepen		Полицай III степен Politsaĭ III stepen
Moldovan Carabinieri
Moldovan Carabinieri	Plutonier-adjutant	Plutonier-major	Plutonier	Sergent-major	Sergent	Sergent-inferior		Caporal			Soldat
Turkish Gendarmerie
Turkish Gendarmerie	Astsubay kıdemli başçavuş		Astsubay başçavuş	Astsubay kıdemli üstçavuş	Astsubay üstçavuş	Astsubay kıdemli çavuş	Astsubay çavuş	Uzman Jandarma Kademeli Çavuş	I. Kıdemli Uzman Çavuş	Uzman Çavuş	Uzman onbaşı
National Guard of Ukraine
National Guard of Ukraine	Головний майстер-сержант Holovnyi maister-serzhant	Старший майстер-сержант Starshyi maister-serzhant	Майстер-сержант; Maister-serzhant	Штаб-сержант; Shtab-serzhant	Головний сержант Holovnyi serzhant	Старший сержант Starshyi serzhant		Сержант; Serzhant			Молодший сержант Molodshyi serzhant	Старший солдат Starshyi soldat	Солдат; Soldat
Rank group	Senior NCOs							Junior NCOs				Enlisted

== See also ==
- Comparative officer ranks of the European Gendarmerie Force
- Comparative army enlisted ranks of the European Union
- Comparative navy enlisted ranks of the European Union
- Comparative air force enlisted ranks of the European Union
