= Jerzy Jarosz =

Polish anesthesiologist

- Born: Jerzy Jarosz; 3 November 1950 (age 75); Warsaw, Poland
- Citizenship: Polish
- Education: MD (1974), PhD (1989)
- Alma mater: Medical Academy of Warsaw (today: Medical University of Warsaw
- Occupations: physician: specialist in anesthesiology and intensive care, and in palliative medicine.

Jerzy Jarosz (born 3 November 1950) is a Polish anesthesiologist, and palliative medicine specialist. He also specializes in pain management, bioethics and medical cannabis.

In 1989, he founded - the second^{[a]} in Poland - oncological hospice. He is also a founder of the first pain management outpatient clinics in Poland. Since then (for over 30 years) he is actively promoting and advocating for the hospice movement and palliative medicine in the Central-Eastern Europe and Caucasus regions. Jarosz is a pioneer expert and promoter of the medical use of cannabis in the cancer pain management and founder of the first Information Point on the Medical Cannabis Treatment in Poland.

Jerzy Jarosz is also a former regional and national expert (Regional Consultant) and international expert for WHO. Member of the Bioethics and Medical Language committees of the Polish Academy of Sciences.

== Education ==
In 1974, he graduated from the Medical Academy of Warsaw with Medical Doctor degree and specialized in anesthesiology (1980) and palliative medicine (2003). In 1989 he obtained his doctoral degree (doktor nauk medycznych (Doctor of Medical Sciences)).

== Professional career ==
=== Career in Poland ===
In 1974, Jarosz began his medical career with a junior doctor (PA, pol. asystent) position in the District Hospital in Opoczno, Poland, where he worked until 1977. In 1977, he moved to Prabuty to continue on junior doctor (PA) position. He later advanced there to the senior doctor position, and eventually was promoted to the Medical director (pl:ordynator). He worked in Prabuty until 1983.

In 1983, he returned to Warsaw, to work for the Maria Sklodowska-Curie National Research Institute of Oncology. He worked in the Institute for 30 years, that is until 2013. His first position there was a senior doctor position (from 1983), followed by the nomination for the Medical Director and later Chief of the anesthesiologist team (until 1994). Later he was appointed the Medical Director of the Department of Anaesthesiology (1994-2004). From 2004 until 2010 he worked as Medical Director of the Palliative Medicine Unit, and for the years 2010-2013 as the Medical Director of the Anesthesiology and Intensive Care Unit.

Moreover, for the years 1999-2009 (10 years), he served (voluntary work) as the Chief Doctor in the Oncological Hospice in Warsaw, which he also co-founded. Since 2013, he served as physician and Coordinator of the Home Hospice Care and Medical Clinic (outpatient clinic), and also as Director of the Research and Didactic Center.

In 2015, Jarosz opened in Warsaw, the first in Poland, Consultation Point on the Medical Cannabis Treatment.

=== International career ===
Through various medical training programs, internships and fellowships in Germany, the United Kingdom, Japan, China, North Korea he gained diverse international medical experience and improved his knowledge of the global trends in his specializations. Additionally, for the years 1992-1993, he worked as consultant-Chief of Anaesthesiology for the Kuwait Cancer Center in Kuwait.

Starting in 2011, Jarosz took a consultancy function for the World Health Organization. In the role of expert, he participated in numerous international missions in the thematic field of palliative care.

== Research ==
Since 1975, Jarosz served as principal investigator in 8 multi-centre, international researches of the phase III and IV in analgesic treatment and vascular accesses.

He also co-authored a book on the use of medical cannabis in pain management, and founded the first Information Point on the Medical Cannabis Treatment in Poland.

Since 1977, Jarosz written and co-authored numerous textbooks on cancer pain treatment and palliative medicine for oncologists, palliative medicine specialists and family doctors. In his publications and through didactic for medical doctors and other medical personnel, Jarosz promoted high standards and the value of e.g. communication in the palliative care.

Since 1985, Jarosz co-authored Polish standards and guidelines in for the use of vascular ports in the administration of chemotherapy. He is also an author of the chapter on vascular accesses in the Polish textbook "Clinical Oncology" (pol. Onkologia kliniczna; OCLC 749309605).

== Academic and professional activities ==
Member of the:

- Polish Psychedelic Society;
- President of the Polish Medical Society of Marihuana and Cannabinoid Medicines;
- founding member and member of the Council of the St. Christopher's Oncology Hospice Foundation.

From 2002 to 2013, Jarosz served as the Regional Consultant in Palliative Medicine in the Mazovian region. Additionally, from 2006 to 2015, he served as the Coordinator of the Palliative Medicine Program, which was organized as part of the National Cancer Control Program in Poland.

From 2011 to 2015, and again for the term of 2019-2022, Jerzy Jarosz served as a member of the Bioethics Committee of the Polish Academy of Sciences. He is also (terms 2012-2014, followed by 2015-2018 and 2019-2022) a member of the Medical Language Expert Board in the Polish Language Council.

== Selected works ==
=== Monographs ===
- Jarosz J., Hilgier M. Leczenie bólów nowotworowych. Publ. Czelej. Lublin, 1997 (Polish) OCLC 297653974
- Szłapak I. P., Jarosz J (ed). Лечение болевого синдрома в онкологии: учеб.-метод. пособие. Петрозаводск: ИнтелТек, 2004, 158 pages. (Russian) ISBN 5-98157-008-3
- Jarosz J. (ed.): Konsylium. Leczenie bólów nowotworowych. AlMedia Publishing House 2009. (Polish) OCLC 751060475

=== Chapters in books and manuals ===
- Jarosz J. “Problemy medyczne w opiece terminalnej”, in: W stronę człowieka umierającego. Drążkiewicz J. (ed.) Uniwersytet Warszawski 1989: pp. 9–29. OCLC 749682727
- Jarosz J. “Leczenie objawowe w opiece paliatywnej, Znieczulenie do operacji i leczenie bólu pooperacyjnego”, in: Nowotwory jelita grubego. Nowacki M. P. (ed.) Wydawnictwo Wiedza i Życie. Warsaw 1996: pp. 398–409. OCLC 751199483
- Jarosz J., Hilgier M. “Leczenie bólów nowotworowych”, in: Zasady rozpoznawania i leczenia nowotworów. Kułakowski A., Towpik E. (ed.) Wyd. PFESO Warsaw 1997. OCLC 750964206
- Jarosz J., Hilgier M. “Standardy postępowania diagnostyczno – terapeutycznego w leczeniu bólów u chorych z zaawansowaną chorobą nowotworową”, in: Standardy leczenia systemowego nowotworów złośliwych u dorosłych w Polsce. Krzakowski M., Siedlecki P. (ed.) PTOK Warsaw 1999: pp. 205–216. OCLC 750034851
- Jarosz J. “Opieka paliatywna”, in: Onkologia w praktyce lekarza rodzinnego. A Kułakowski (ed.). Wydawnictwo Lekarskie PZWL. Warsaw 2000: pp. 182–206. OCLC 749803242
- Jarosz J. “Leczenie przeciwbólowe w onkologii”, in: Współczesne metody zwalczania bólu. Gumułka W., Meszaros J. (ed.). Ośrodek Informacji Naukowej „Polfa”. Warsaw 2000: pp. 129–160. OCLC 751555563
- Jarosz J. “Leczenie bólu. Kaniulacja żył centralnych w celu podawania chemioterapii w onkologii”, in: Onkologia Kliniczna - vol. 1. Krzakowski M (ed.). Wydawnictwo Med. Borgis .Warsaw 2001: pp. 468–484 OCLC 749309605
- Jarosz J. “Medycyna paliatywna - rozważania ogólne”, in: Medycyna Bólu. Dobrogowski J., Wordliczek J. (ed.). PZWL. Warsaw 2003: pp. 535–547. OCLC 749827317
- Jarosz J., Hilgier M., Kaczmarek Z., Walden de Gałuszko K. “Leczenie bólów nowotworowych”, in: Zalecenia postępowania diagnostyczno - terapeutycznego w nowotworach złośliwych u dorosłych. Krzakowski (ed.). Polska Unia Onkologii 2003. OCLC 749381226
- Jarosz J., Hilgier M. “Wyniszczenie nowotworowe - zespół kacheksja-anoreksja - astenia Zasady diagnostyki i leczenia bólu”, in: Podstawy Opieki Paliatywnej. De Walden - Gałuszko K. (ed.). PZWL Warsaw 2004: pp. 20–49. OCLC 749843206
- Jarosz J. “Opieka paliatywna”, in: Ginekologia onkologiczna wiedza i humanizm. Zieliński J. (ed.) Wyd Borgis 2008 OCLC 316483167
- Jarosz J. E. Góraj “Leczenie bólów nowotworowych”, Jarosz J. “Leczenie bólów nowotworowych – stan obecny”. Jarosz J. “Standardy leczenia bólów nowotworowych”, in: Konsylium. Leczenie bólów nowotworowych. Jarosz J. (ed.), Wyd. AlMedia 2009. OCLC 751060475
- Jarosz J. “Opieka paliatywna i leczenie bólów nowotworowych”, in: Chirurgia Onkologiczna. Jeziorski A, Szawłowski AW, Towpik E. (ed.). Wydawnictwo Lekarskie PZWL. Warsaw 2009.OCLC 1043039033
- Jarosz J. “Leczenie bólów nowotworowych Minimalnie inwazyjne metody leczenia bólu, Farmakologiczne leczenie bólu)”, in: Leczenie bólu w różnych schorzeniach, Koszewski W. (ed.) Termedia 2009. OCLC 751337683

=== Editorial boards ===
Jarosz is a member of the board of journals in palliative medicine in Poland: "Biuletyn Polskiego Towarzystwa Onkologicznego NOWOTWORY" (eng. Nowotwory Journal of Oncology), "Onkologia w praktyce klinicznej" (eng. Oncology in clinical practise), and "Medycyna paliatywna" (eng. Palliative medicine).

== Notes ==
^aFirst one was Father Eugeniusz Dutkiewicz SAC Hospice, which was founded in 1983 in Gdańsk.
