= Infantry Company of the Lithuanian Tribunal =

Hungarian Company of the Lithuanian Tribunal
- Active: 1698–1795
- Country: Grand Duchy of Lithuania
- Type: Infantry
- Size: 50–100
- Garrison/HQ: Maišiagala and Širvintos
- Engagements: Vilnius uprising (1794)

The Infantry Company of the Lithuanian Tribunal (Lithuanian: Lietuvos vyriausiojo tribunolo pėstininkų kuopa) also known as the Hungarian Banner of the Lithuanian Tribunal (Lithuanian: Lietuvos tribunolo vengrų vėliava; Polish: Chorągiew Węgierska Trybunału Litewskiego) was an infantry company of the Grand Duchy of Lithuania charged with protecting the Lithuanian Tribunal, as well as guarding detainees. It was not part of the Lithuanian Grand Ducal Army's establishment. It was called "Hungarian", because its infantry was of the Hungarian-type.

== History ==
During the Lithuanian Civil War (1697–1702), the anti-Sapieha coalition (also called the Republicans) decided to found the Tribunal Banner, which would be made up of the Hungarian-type infantry, in 1698. Its infantry was called Hungarian to distinguish it from the German-type, which was the other infantry type in the Polish–Lithuanian Commonwealth. The Tribunal Banner, which was a military unit, was not to be commanded by the Lithuanian Grand Hetman, a military commander, but by the Marshal of the Tribunal, a civilian authority. The duty of ensuring the security of the Tribunal's work and maintaining order in the city where the Tribunal's meetings were held was to be entrusted to the Marshal of the Tribunal. The coalition also wanted to prohibit hetmans from bringing in additional units into the city while the Tribunal was in session.

As the unit began forming, the Republicans decided to more firmly establish its existence through the resolution of Lithuanian nobility on 21 December 1698 in Gardinas. Like with the nobility's other demands, August II the Strong agreed to the creation of a military unit not subordinate to the hetman, while himself successfully pressuring Sapieha to agree to his enemy's demands. During the Sejm of 1699, which was in session from June 16 to 30, the Tribunal Banner was legalized and its strength established at 100 Hungarian-type infantrymen and a few officers. The unit had a yearly budget of 25,000 ducats and these funds were to be allocated from the proceeds of the Jewish poll tax (also as known as the pillow tax).

After the Sejm's decision, the Lithuanian Tribunal adopted the Tribunal Banner's "ordination", i.e. regulations governing the unit's composition, tasks and statutes, during the tribunal's session in Naugardukas on 30 November 1699. They stated that the Tribunal Banner could only be subordinated to the Lithuanian Tribunal and its marshal, who would be "like a hetman" to the banner. The unit had to obey the marshal not only during his term of office in the Lithuanian Tribunal, but until a new marshal of the Tribunal was elected. Yearly on May 12, during the inauguration of the Lithuanian Tribunal in Vilnius, a review of the banner had to be carried out. The same was to be repeated in Minskas or Naugardukas on November 12. The Republican-appointed rotmistras Jokūbas Kijanovskis (Polish: Jakub Kijanowski) was appointed the Tribunal Banner's commander. Despite the Republicans no longer having the absolute control over the Lithuanian Tribunal which they had in 1698, the Great Scribe of Lithuania Jonas Steponas Tyzenhauzas implemented the Sejm's decision.

However, the Grand Hetman Sapieha did not want to recognize this military unit formed against his will. The Tribunal Banner's task of maintaining order in Vilnius and protecting the Tribunal were removed by the Sapieha-influenced Tribunal that was inaugurated in 1700 after an agreement between the Sapiehas and Radvilas. Instead of the banner, the elected Marshal of the Tribunal, Chancellor Radvila, relied on his private military units. The decision to establish the Tribunal Banner that was only subject to the Tribunal's marshal, was approved by Lithuania's Republicans in the so-called Valkininkai resolution of 24 November 1700, which also provided for the possibility of using military coercion against Jewish communities if they did not pay the portion of the Jewish poll tax assigned to financing the military unit on time. The Supreme Lithuanian Tribunal's Hungarian Infantry (sometimes also called Janissary) Banner was finally legalized in 1717 during the so-called Silent Sejm. In the same session, the structure and composition (so-called Komput) of the Lithuanian Grand Ducal Army was also established. In contrast to the past, the Tribunal Banner had less financing than before, as it was only allocated 20,000 ducats, collected from the Jewish poll tax as before. Notably, the Tribunal's Banner was not counted in the army's composition, which was itself only allocated 6100 posts, i.e. salary units. In such a manner, the unit's autonomy from the hetman was ensured. Additionally, the Sejm's constitution did not name the Tribunal Banner's garrison location or size and it can only be assumed that the aforementioned hundred soldiers and a few officers continued serving. Generally, the Banner was in those cities where the Lithuanian Tribunal was in session.

The Tribunal Banner was useful in strengthening the authority of the Tribunal's marshals and protected it from the direct intervention of magnates or pressure from officials. Considering that an analogous unit, the Treasury Banner (Regiment) was established in the 18th century's latter half for Lithuania's Treasury, with the mission of ensuring the security and order of the treasury system at its meeting place in Gardinas.

The company is supposed to have had 64 soldiers as of 22 June 1790. In 1792, the company was stationed in Maišiagala and Širvintos. In August 1793, the company had 63 soldiers. On 23 April 1794, the company, with its 50 soldiers, participated in the Vilnius uprising.

== Bibliography ==
=== References ===
- Daujotas, Jonas (1997). Surgailis, Gintautas (ed.). "LDK (Lietuvos Didžiosios Kunigaikštystės) Kariuomenė XVIII a.". Karo Archyvas (in Lithuanian). XIV. Lietuvos Respublikos krašto apsaugos ministerija.
- Estreicher, Karol (2000). Bibliografia polska (in Polish). Kraków: Wydawnictwo Uniwersytetu Jagiellońskiego. ISBN 83-233-1488-8.
- Gembarzewski, Bronisław (1925). Rodowody pułków polskich i oddziałów równorzędnych od r. 1717 do r. 1831. Warsaw.
- Ratajczyk, Leonard; Teodorczyk, Jerzy (1987). Wojsko powstania kościuszkowskiego w oczach współczesnych malarzy (in Polish). Warsaw.
- Rospond, Vincent W. (2013). Polish Armies of the Partitions 1770–94. Great Britain: Osprey Publishing. ISBN 978-1-84908855-8.
- kam.lt (2014-04-17). "Virš Valdovų rūmų pakils istorinė vėliava ir griaudės pabūklai, minėsime Vilniaus išvadavimą iš Rusijos imperijos". KAM (in Lithuanian).
- Sliesoriūnas, Gintautas (2015). Šmigelskytė-Stukienė, Ramunė (ed.). "Lietuvos Didžiosios Kunigaikštystės Vyriausiasis Tribunolas Vilniuje XVII ir XVIII amžių sandūroje - politinės kovos arena" [The Supreme Tribunal of the Grand Duchy of Lithuania in Vilnius at the junction of 17th and 18th centuries: The arena of political battles] (PDF). XVIII amžiaus studijos (in Lithuanian). 2. Lietuvos Istorijos Institutas.
- Stankevič, Adam (2013). "Lietuvos Vyriausiojo Tribunolo veikla XVIII a. II pusėje: Bajoriškosios teisės raiška". Humanitariniai mokslai, istorija. Vilnius.
- Unknown (1860). "Volumina legum". Pan Biblioteka Kórnicka. VII. Petersburg.
