= European Gendarmerie Force =

Rapid reaction force composed of various European police and gendarmerie forces

- Coat of arms
- Active: 2006–present
- Country: 8 member states: Italy; France; Lithuania; Netherlands; Poland; Portugal; Romania; Spain
- Allegiance: European Union (Note: The corps is made available to the Common Security and Defence Policy in accordance with TEU, Article 42.3.)
- Type: Gendarmerie force
- Size: ~ 800
- Mottos: "Lex paciferat" (Latin) "The law will bring peace"
- Colours: Blue
- Website: eurogendfor.org

Insignia
- Flag

The European Gendarmerie Force (EUROGENDFOR) is a European rapid reaction force composed of elements of several European police and gendarmerie forces. EUROGENDFOR is tasked with performing policing tasks within the scope of crisis management operations. The Permanent Headquarters is located in Vicenza, Italy.

It was established by an agreement in 2004 between five member states of the European Union (EU): France, Italy, the Netherlands, Portugal, and Spain. Romania joined in 2008, and Poland received full member status in 2013. In 2009, Lithuania received partner status and Turkey received observer status; in 2025, Lithuania became a full member. Moldova obtained observer status in 2023 followed by Ukraine in 2024. At the beginning of 2026, Finland became a partner and Bulgaria an observer. The organisation's status is enshrined in the Treaty of Velsen signed on 18 October 2007.

It is presently not established at the EU level (referred to as the Common Security and Defence Policy, CSDP); it is for instance not a project of the Permanent Structured Cooperation (PESCO) of the CSDP. It may however contribute in the implementation of the CSDP, when made available as a multinational force in accordance with article 42.3 of the Treaty on European Union (TEU).

== History ==
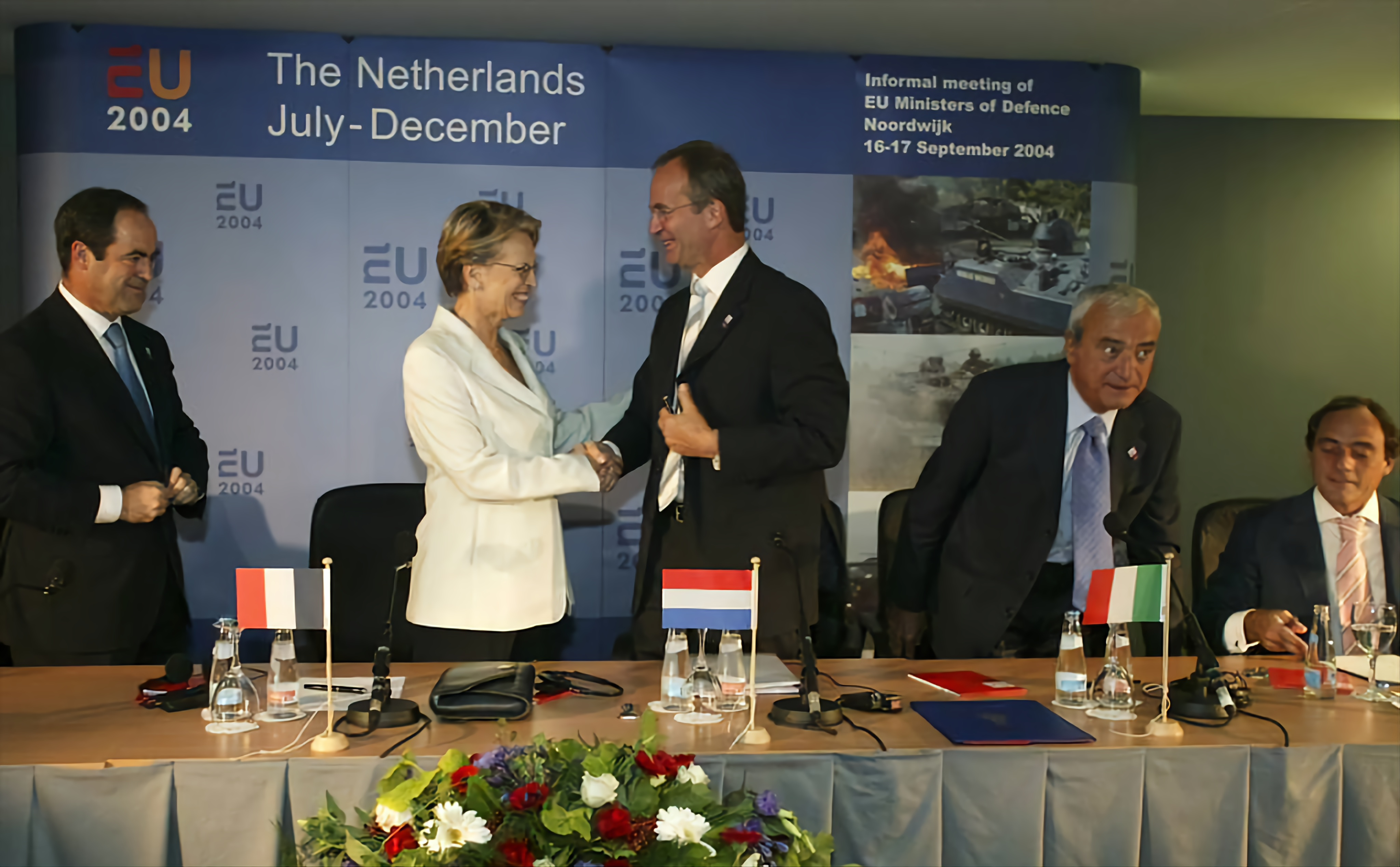
EUROGENDFOR's Declaration of Intent 2004

The French Defence Minister Michèle Alliot-Marie first proposed the force in September 2003. Alliot-Marie and the Italian Defense Minister Antonio Martino presented the idea at the Meeting of European Union Defense Ministers in October 2003. The implementation agreement was finally signed by defence ministers of the five participating countries on 17 September 2004 in Noordwijk, Netherlands. On 23 January 2006, the EGF was officially inaugurated during a military ceremony in the Gen. Chinotto barracks in Vicenza.

Following two successful Command Post exercises (CPX) in Saint-Astier, France, in June 2005 and Valdemoro, Spain, in April 2006, EUROGENDFOR was declared fully operational on 20 July 2006. This status was formalised by the Treaty of Velsen on 18 October 2007.

After Romania's accession to the European Union, the Romanian Gendarmerie sought permanent observer status within the European Gendarmerie Force, as a first step towards full membership. On 7 September 2008, the Romanian Gendarmerie was admitted as a full member of the European Gendarmerie Force. The Lithuanian Public Security Service was granted with partner status on 15 December 2009, while the Turkish Gendarmerie became an observer on 13 May 2009. The Lithuanian Public Security Service became a full member on 11 December 2025.

The Polish Military Gendarmerie was originally a partner force of EUROGENDFOR. On 10 October 2006 it was reported that the country had expressed an interest in joining the organisation as a full member. In December 2011 Poland applied for full membership in EGF, and in 2013 the Polish Military Gendarmerie officially joined as a member state.

With Moldova and Ukraine being granted observer status in 2023 and 2024 respectively, and more recently Finland becoming a partner as well as Bulgaria an observer, the current number of integrated countries is thirteen.

== Missions ==
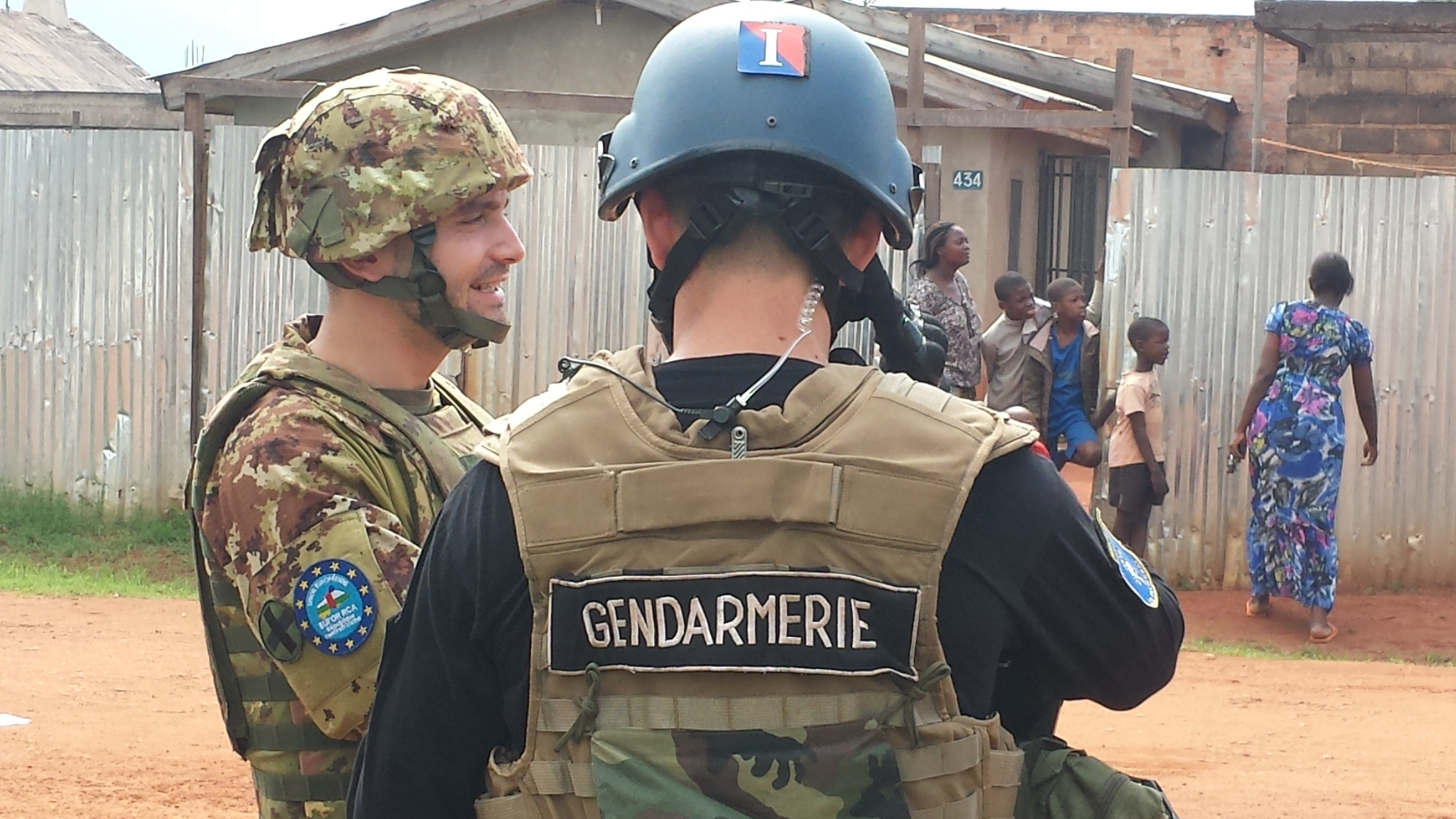
EUFOR Mission personnel in the Central African Republic in 2014

Since December 2009, the EGF has taken part in the NATO International Security Assistance Force (ISAF) training operation of the Afghan National Police (ANP) in the War in Afghanistan.

In 2009 the EGF deployed 196 personnel to Afghanistan to support training Afghan National Civil Order Police (ANCOP) officers and non-commissioned officers. EGF personnel trained them in ANCOP training centers but also accompanied, advised and helped during ANCOP missions in P-OMLT (Police Operational Mentoring and Liaison Teams). Initially the mission was planned to have between 400 and 500 personnel deployed. By 2010, the number of deployed personnel had grown to 276, including 124 French gendarmes, and further personnel from Spain, Netherlands, Poland, Romania, and Portugal. As of May 2010, it had trained 50 officers and 250 non-commissioned officers of the ANCOP, and the then French Minister of Defense Brice Hortefeux announced that 40 more French gendarmes would be sent to help this mission.

In response to the 2010 Haiti earthquake, the EGF was deployed to Haiti in February 2010 to help with post-relief security efforts.

== Relationship with EU defence policy ==
The EGF has been widely misrepresented, notably with regard to its general purpose and specific relationship to the EU. The EGF is not an EU body, and has no power to intervene on the soil of the EU and its Member States, including the EGF countries.

The EGF is presently not established at the EU level (referred to as the Common Security and Defence Policy, CSDP); it is for instance not a project of the Permanent Structured Cooperation (PESCO) of the CSDP. The EGF may however contribute in the implementation of the CSDP, when made available as a multinational force in accordance with article 42.3 of the Treaty on European Union (TEU).

== Structure ==
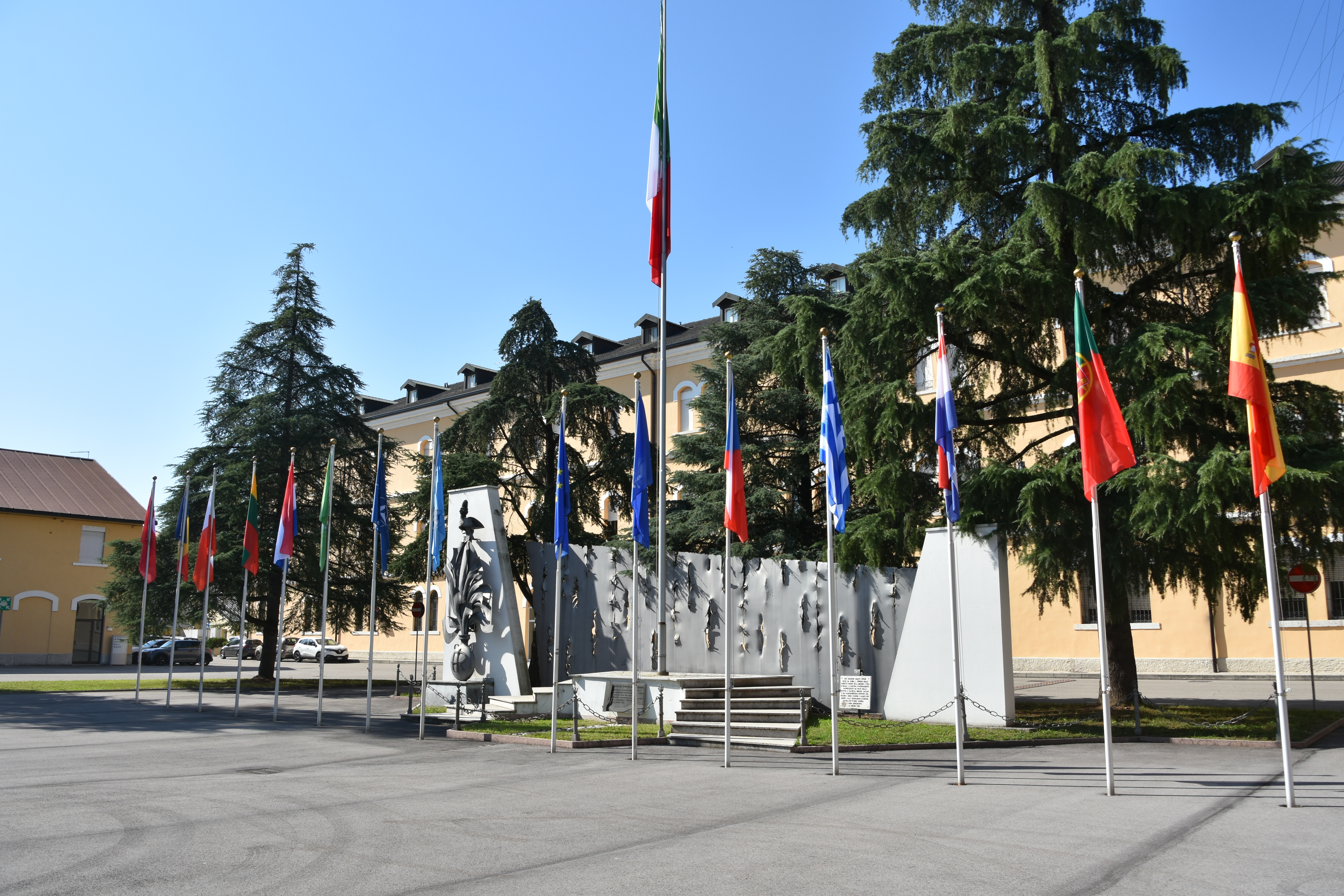
Permanent Headquarters in Vicenza, (Italy)

The European Gendarmerie Force command structure consists of three levels:

- Political-Strategic Level: represented by the High Level Interdepartmental Committee (CIMIN), composed of representatives of the current Ministers of each Member State, ensuring political and military coordination, appointing the EUROGENDFOR's Commander, and providing him/her with directives and guidance for employment.
- Operational Level: represented by the Permanent Headquarters located in Vicenza (northeastern Italy). This is the most visible part of the Organisation and the only permanent structure. It is staffed by 40 people (2025), and has a deployable core of between 800 and 900 personnel.
- Tactical Level: The European Gendarmerie Force is defined in its treaty as personnel from police forces with military status. They are assigned by the parties to fulfil a mission or exercise, following the transfer of authority. A limited number of other personnel are also designated by the parties, in an advisory or supporting role. An additional 2,300 reinforcements are available on standby.

=== Commanders ===
No.	Portrait	Name	Term of office			Country	Ref.
No.	Portrait	Name	Took office	Left office	Time in office	Country	Ref.
1		Brigadier general Gerard Deanaz	25 January 2005	26 June 2007	2 years, 152 days	France	
2		Colonel; Giovanni Truglio (born 1959)	26 June 2007	25 June 2009	1 year, 364 days	Italy	
3		Colonel; Jorge Estéves	25 June 2009	28 June 2011	2 years, 3 days	Portugal	
4		Colonel; Cornelis Kuijs	28 June 2011	28 June 2013	2 years, 0 days	Netherlands	
5		Colonel; Francisco Esteban Pérez	28 June 2011	26 June 2015	3 years, 363 days	Spain	
6		Brigadier general Philippe Rio	26 June 2015	27 June 2017	2 years, 1 day	France	
7		Colonel; Lucian Gavrilă	28 June 2017	27 June 2019	1 year, 364 days	Romania	
8		Colonel; Giuseppe Zirone	28 June 2019	24 June 2021	1 year, 361 days	Italy	
9		Colonel; Paulo Jorge Macedo Gonçalves (born 1970)	25 June 2021	27 June 2023	2 years, 2 days	Portugal	
10		Colonel; Hans Vroegh	28 June 2023	18 June 2025	1 year, 355 days	Netherlands	
11		Colonel; Paweł Grajek	19 June 2025	Ongoing		Poland	

== Members ==
EGF member states: Dark blue: Full members; Blue: Partners; Light blue: Observers

The treaty allows for any EU member state to become a European Gendarmerie Force member state, subject to the approval of existing European Gendarmerie Force members. The member forces are:

EU Member State	Institution
France	National Gendarmerie
Italy	Carabinieri
Lithuania	Public Security Service
Netherlands	Royal Marechaussee
Poland	Military Gendarmerie
Portugal	National Republican Guard
Romania	Gendarmerie
Spain	Civil Guard

Germany does not take part, as its constitution does not permit the use of military forces for police services. In 2004, Peter Struck, Minister of Defense at the time, clarified that the legal foundation for militarised police forces is different from the expectations underlying the EGF. The paramilitary Bereitschaftspolizei units of the Länder states have no standing patrol order like the German Federal Police. Germany did not sign the Treaty of Velsen on the EGF or any subsequent accord. Instead, there is a tight integration of police forces based on the Prüm Treaty. Originally the Prüm Treaty regulated access to police databases of neighboring countries but it was used multiple times as the legal foundation to exchange riot police equipment and personnel with the participating countries (Germany, Spain, France, Luxembourg, Netherlands, Austria, and Belgium). In 2008 the Prüm Treaty was naturalised as EU law, allowing countries access to police forces regulated under EU law (based on the Schengen Agreement). The European Police Forces Training of 2009 (EUPFT 2009) was run in Vicenza (home of EGF headquarters) and the EUPFT 2010 on anti-riot tactics was run in Lehnin in Germany.

=== Partners ===
EU Member States and EU candidates countries that have a force with military status and some police skills may apply for partner status. CIMIN shall define the specific right and obligations of the partner.

The Finnish Border Guard announced its intention to become a partner of EUROGENDFOR in the second half of 2025, officially joining as of February 2026. As part of this commitment, the Finnish Border Guard has offered to deploy a liaison officer to the Organisation's Headquarters in Vicenza, Italy.

State	Institution
Finland	Finnish Border Guard

=== Observers ===
EU candidate countries that have a police force with military status may apply for observer status. EU member states that have a police force with military status may also apply for observer status as a first step to accession. Observer status entails the right to second a liaison officer to the Permanent Headquarters in accordance with the rules approved by CIMIN. In 2026, Bulgaria with its gendarmerie joined the European Gendarmerie Force as an observer.

State	Institution
Turkey	Gendarmerie General Command
Moldova	Trupele de Carabinieri
Ukraine	National Guard of Ukraine
Bulgaria	Gendarmerie

== Gallery ==
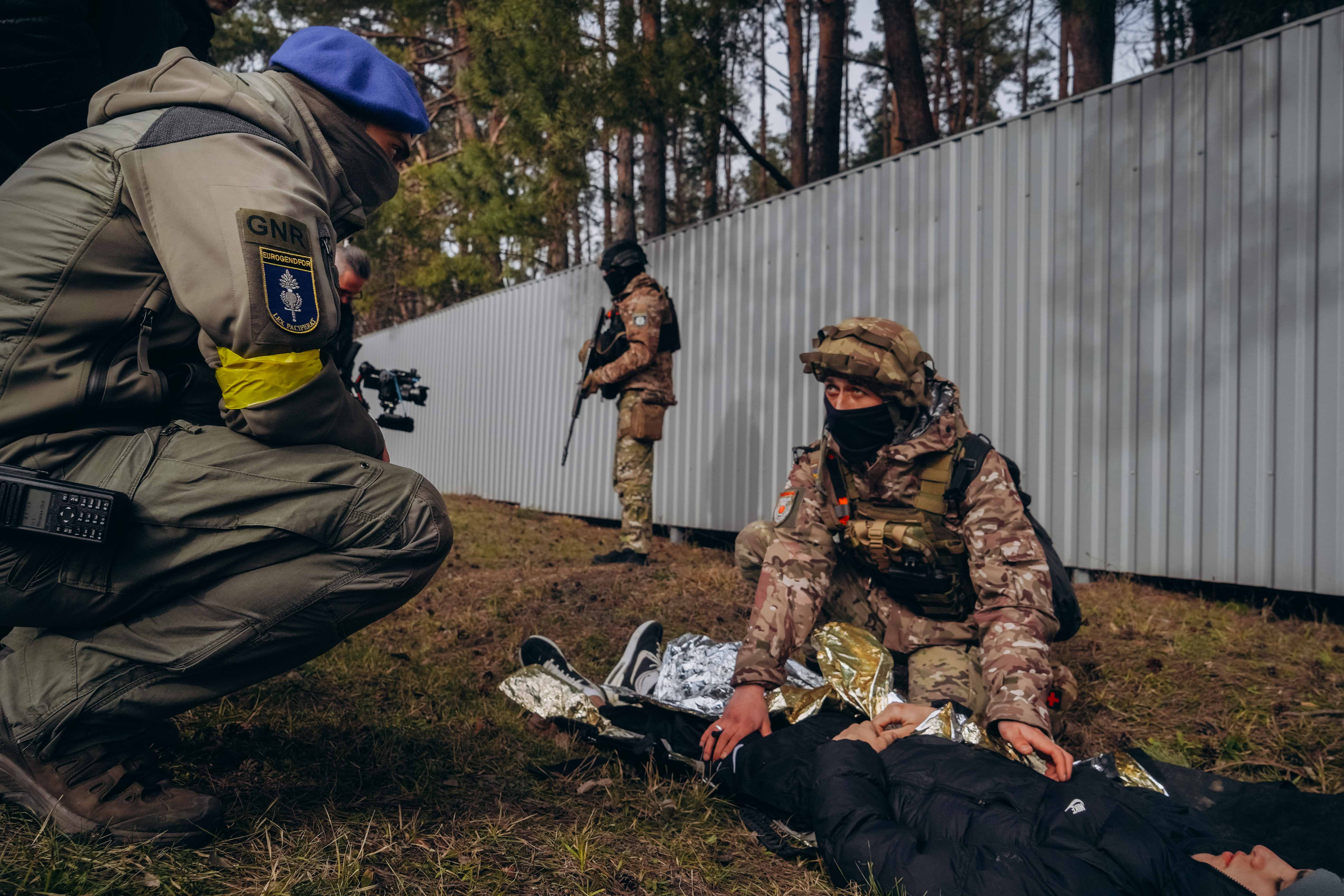
EUROGENDFOR personnel training Ukrainian National Guardsmen, 2024

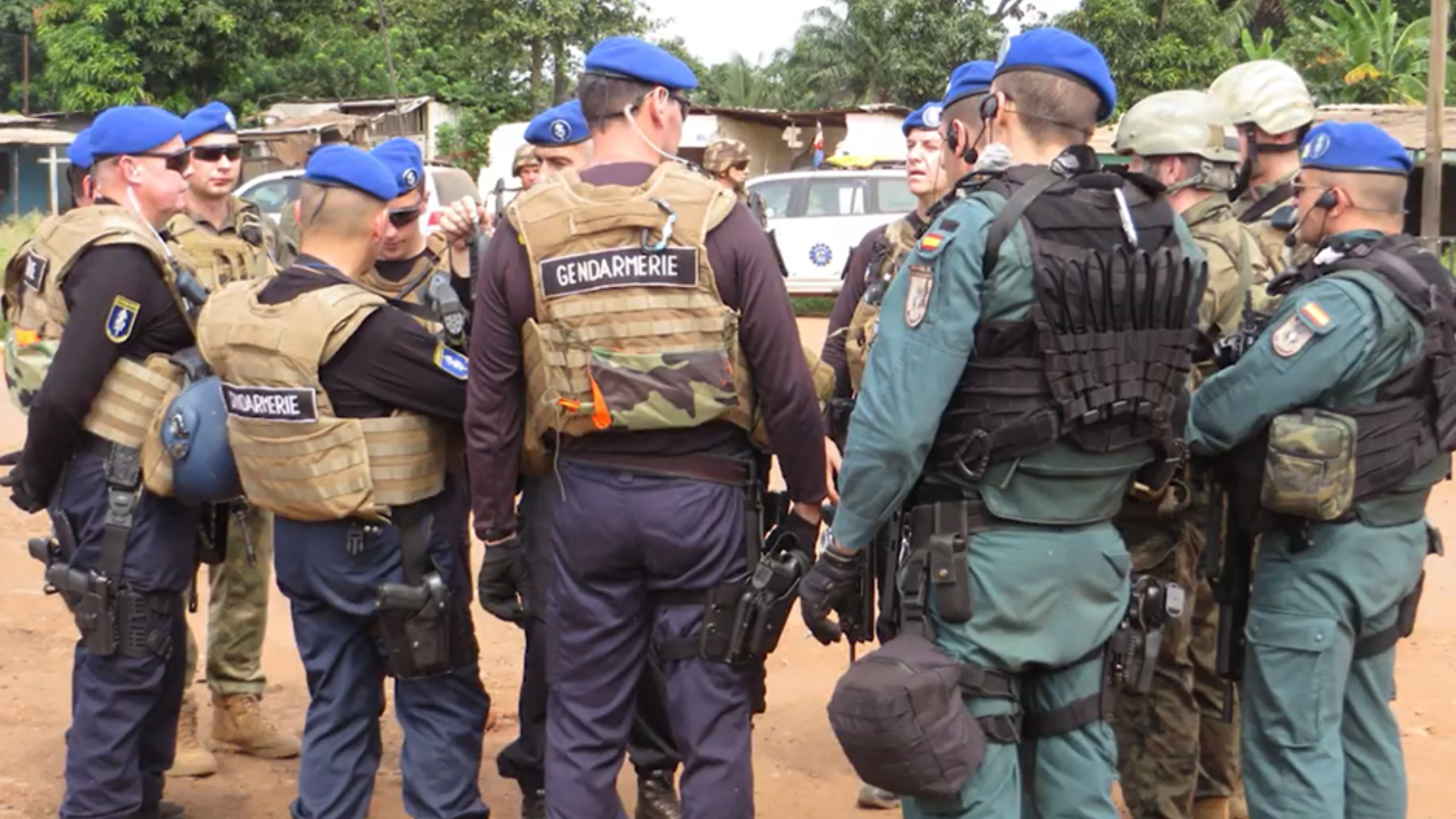
Personnel from several EUROGENDFOR members on a joint deployment to the Central African Republic, 2025

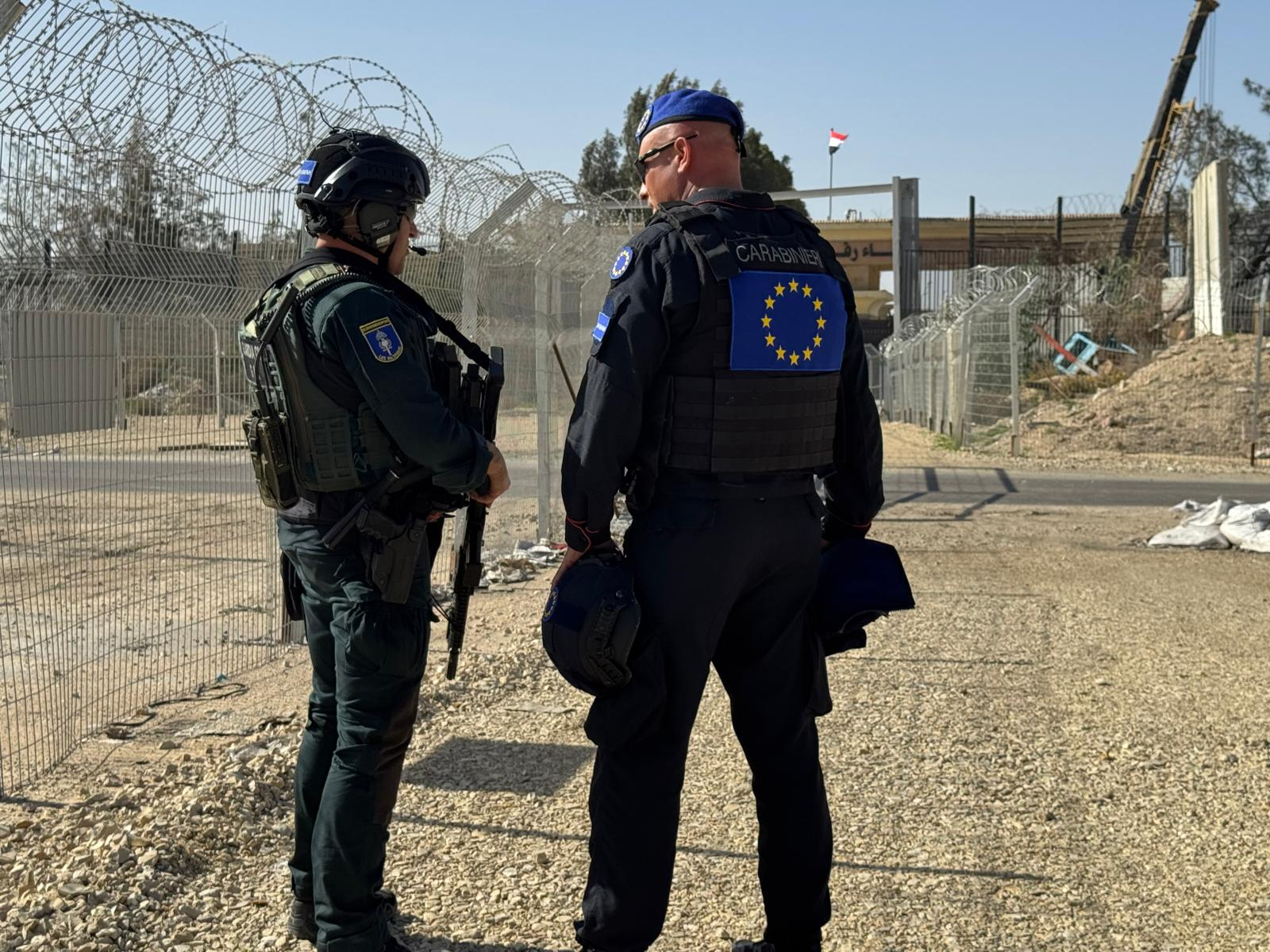
Spanish and Italian personnel of the European Union Border Assistance Mission to Rafah, March 2026

== See also ==
- Comparative officer ranks of the European Gendarmerie Force
- Comparative enlisted ranks of the European Gendarmerie Force
- International Association of Gendarmeries and Police Forces with Military Status
- Common Security and Defence Policy
  - EU Battlegroup
- Eurocorps
- European Maritime Force
