= Hajduk (Polish–Lithuanian Commonwealth) =

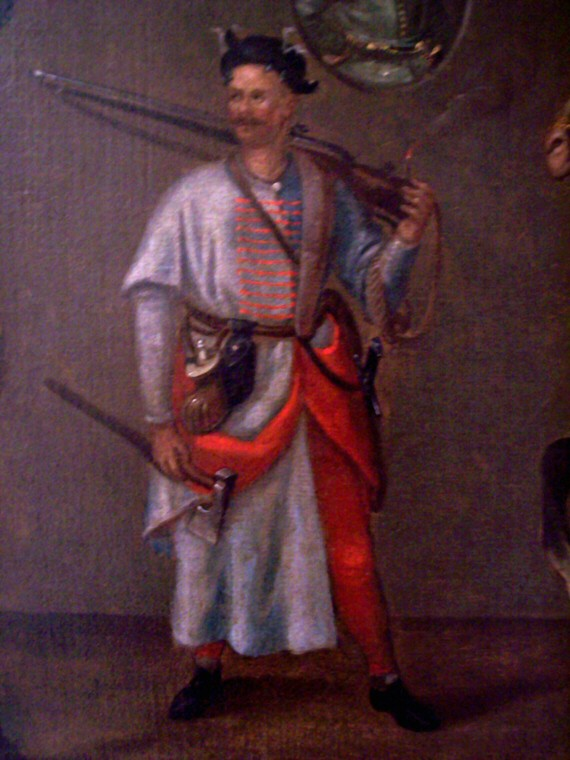
Hajduk (1620)

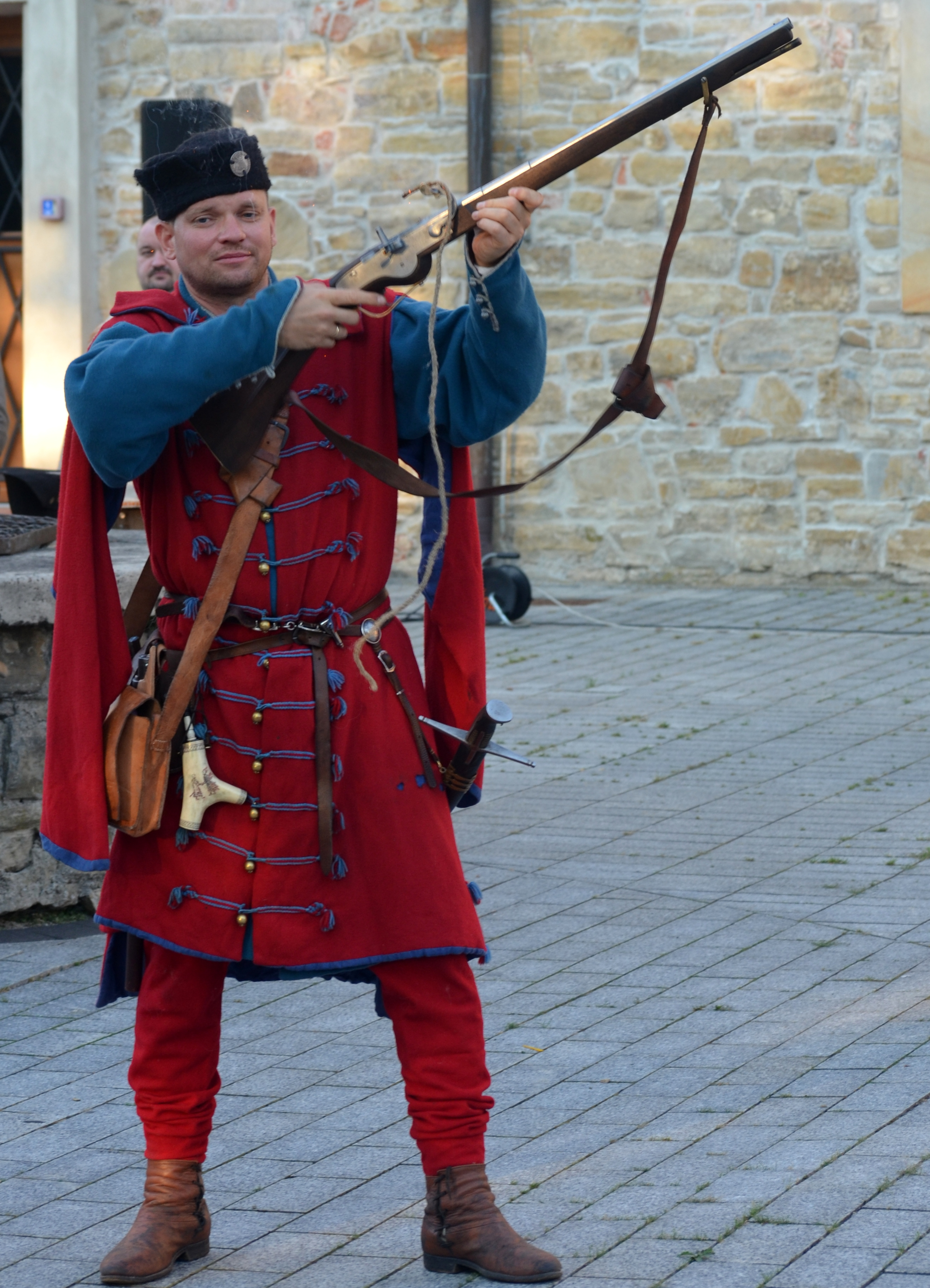
Hajduk (2020)

The word hajduk entered the Polish language from Hungarian in the late 16th century. It was initially a colloquial term for a style of footsoldier, Hungarian or Turco-Balkan in inspiration, that was introduced by King Stephen Báthory in the 1570s, and who formed the backbone of the Polish infantry arm from the 1570s until about the 1630s. Unusually for this period, Polish–Lithuanian hajduks wore uniforms, typically of grey-blue woollen cloth, with red collar and cuffs. Their principal weapon was a small calibre matchlock firearm, known as an arquebus. For close combat they also carried a heavy variety of sabre, capable of hacking off the heads of enemy pikes and polearms.

Contrary to popular opinion, the small axe they often wore tucked in their belt (not to be confused with the huge half-moon shaped bardiche axe, which was seldom carried by hajduks) was not a combat weapon, but rather was intended for cutting wood.

In the mid 17th century hajduk-style infantry largely fell out of fashion in Poland–Lithuania, and were replaced by musket-armed infantry of Western style. However, commanders or hetmans of the Polish–Lithuanian Commonwealth continued to maintain their own liveried bodyguards of hajduks, well into the 18th century as something of a throwback to the past, even though they were now rarely used as field troops. In imitation of these bodyguards, in the 18th century wealthy members of the szlachta hired liveried domestic servants who they called hajduks, thereby creating the meaning of the term 'hajduk' as it is generally understood in modern Polish.

== Sources ==
- Richard Brzezinski, Polish Armies 1569-1696, volume 1, London: Osprey Military Publishing, 1987 (also contains six contemporary illustrations of Polish hajduks, besides several modern reconstructions by Angus McBride).
