= Vascular access for chemotherapy =

Access of the bloodstream

In medicine, vascular access is a means of accessing the bloodstream through the peripheral or central blood vessels in order to obtain blood or deliver medications including chemotherapy. A vascular access procedure involves insertion of a sterile plastic tube called a catheter into a blood vessel. Types of catheters can be either peripherally or centrally located. Peripheral catheters are approximately one inch (25 mm) long and are inserted into the small veins of the forearm. Central catheters are bigger and longer and are inserted into the large veins of the extremities, neck, or chest. Central venous catheters are the primary modality used for delivery of chemotherapeutic agents. The duration of central venous catheterization is dependent on the type of treatment given.

== Central venous catheters ==
Central venous catheters (CVC) are catheters inserted into the large veins of the arm, neck, chest, or groin. CVC's are used for delivery of medications, nutrients, or blood products for a longer periods, usually weeks to months. There are several reasons for the use of central venous access:

- To get more than one drug at a time
- To get continuous infusion chemo (over 24 hours or longer)
- To get nutrition
- To get frequent treatments
- To get treatments at home
- To get long-term therapy (over many months or even longer)
- To get drugs that can cause serious damage to skin and muscle tissue if they leak outside a vein (these drugs are known as vesicants). Getting them through a CVC rather than in a short-term IV reduces the risk that the drug will leak and damage tissues.

Types of CVCs include peripherally inserted central catheters, tunneled catheters, and implanted ports.

=== Peripherally-inserted central catheters ===
Peripherally-inserted central catheters (PICC, pronounced "pick"), is a form of vascular access that is inserted at a peripheral site such as the veins of the arms and extends in the central venous system at the superior vena cava. The catheters in inserted into the veins in the arm such as the cephalic, basilic, or brachial veins and then advanced towards the heart. The line can then be used for delivery of chemotherapeutic agents. Removal of a PICC is a relatively simple procedure that can be accomplished by a trained nurse even in the outpatient setting. The area is bandaged and allowed to heal.

=== Tunneled catheters ===
A tunneled catheter is a catheter (a thin tube) that is placed in a vein for long-term use. It is most commonly placed in the neck (internal jugular) but may also be placed in the groin (femoral), liver (transhepatic), chest (subclavian) or back (translumbar). The catheter is inserted into the vessel under ultrasound or fluoroscopic guidance and tunneled through the skin. Tunneled catheters have multiple channels called lumens which lay exposed on the surface of the skin. These lumens are the access points when the catheter is used. Tunneled catheters can be single, double, or triple lumened. Removal of a tunneled catheter is a simple procedure requiring only local anesthetic. A bandage is applied to the site to heal.

=== Implanted port ===
A port is similar to a tunneled catheter but is left entirely under the skin. Medicines are injected through the skin into the catheter. Some implanted ports contain a small reservoir that can be refilled in the same way. After being filled, the reservoir slowly releases the medicine into the bloodstream. An implanted port is less obvious than a tunneled catheter and requires little daily care. It has less impact on a person's activities than a PICC line or a tunneled catheter. Surgically implanted infusion ports are placed below the clavicle (infraclavicular fossa), with the catheter threaded into the heart (right atrium) through a large vein. Once implanted, the port is accessed via noncoring "Huber" needles inserted through the skin. The health care provider may need to use topical anesthetic before accessing the port. Ports can be used for medications, chemotherapy, and blood. As ports are located completely under the skin, they are easier to maintain and have a lower risk of infection than CVC or PICC catheters. Ports are typically used on patients requiring only occasional venous access over a long duration course of therapy. Since the port must be accessed using a needle, if venous access is required on a frequent basis a catheter having external access is more commonly used

== Central venous catheter complications ==
Complications associated with central venous catheters include infection, pneumothorax, thrombosis, misplacement, and bleeding.

=== Pneumothorax ===
Penumothorax can occur during insertion of the catheter. The use of ultrasound guidance aids in mitigating the risk of pneumothorax by ensuring proper placement through direct visualization.

=== Infection ===
Catheters can introduce bacteria into the bloodstream which can lead to local infection and possibly sepsis. Risk of infection is mitigated during insertion through use of sterile technique and proper catheter care after insertion which includes keeping the area of the catheter clean, washing of hands prior to use, and application of clean dressings. In the event of a central line infection, the line is removed and appropriate antimicrobial agents are given according to the type of infectious organism and severity of clinical condition.

=== Bleeding ===
Since catheters are placed within blood vessels there is always a risk of bleeding during placement and while the catheter is in place. Bleeding can range from localized hematoma (bruise) to hemorrhage (profuse bleeding).

=== Thrombosis ===
The use of central venous catheters is a risk factor for the formation of blood clots in the upper extremity. The etiology is thought to be due to activation of the clotting cascade by trauma to the vein during placement as well as the presence of a foreign body within the vasculature. For patients with central venous access, a wide variation in the incidence of vein thrombosis (1 to 66 percent) is reported and the incidence depends upon the catheter type and location, criteria for diagnosis, and population studied

=== Misplacement ===
CVC misplacement is more common when the anatomy of the person is different or difficult due to injury or past surgery. CVCs can be mistakenly placed in an artery during insertion (for example, the carotid artery or vertebral artery when placed in the neck or common femoral artery when placed in the groin). During subclavian vein central line placement, the catheter can be accidentally pushed into the internal jugular vein on the same side instead of the superior vena cava. A chest x-ray is performed after insertion to rule out this possibility. The tip of the catheter can also be misdirected into the contralateral (opposite side) subclavian vein in the neck, rather than into the superior vena cava. The risk of misplacement is mitigated through the use of ultrasound or fluoroscopic guidance which allows for direct visualization of the catheter during placement. Post procedure x-rays are also obtained to confirm proper positioning.
