= Military Gendarmerie (Poland) =

Polish military police force

Military Gendarmerie Żandarmeria Wojskowa
- Badge of the Military Gendarmerie
- Abbreviation: ŻW

Agency overview
- Formed: 1 September 1990

Jurisdictional structure
- Operations jurisdiction: Poland
- Constituting instruments: Act on the Military Gendarmerie and other law enforcement authorities, 2001; No. Pf-42 / Org. Minister of National Defense of 18 April 1990; No. 062 / Org. Chief of the General Staff of the Polish Army of June 15, 1990
- General nature: Military police

Operational structure
- Headquarters: Warsaw, Poland
- Agency executive: płk Tomasz Kajzer, Chief Commander
- Parent agency: Ministry of National Defence

Notables
- Anniversary: 13 June (Military Gendarmerie day)

Website
- Official website

The Military Gendarmerie (Polish: Żandarmeria Wojskowa, ŻW) is the military police of Poland. Established in 1990, it is a specialized service of the Polish Armed Forces responsible for policing functions within the armed forces and other tasks defined in statute.

The exact role of the gendarmerie has been historically difficult to ascertain, with several changes and developments since the fall of communism. Prior to the abolition of conscription in 2009, the ŻW was primarily responsible with conscription and investigating conscription evasion, however the unit returned to traditional military policing after this with a confusing hiatus of their public role and deployment for 10 years with ad-hoc deployment at the government's will. Since the coronavirus pandemic however, ŻW has taken an increasingly public role in society.

In further confusion, in 2021 the Gendarmerie was demoted from a full service branch of the Polish Armed Forces, instead being classified as an "other" unit, alongside the Inspectorate of Armed Forces Support (logistics unit), the Warsaw Garrison (various representational and ceremonial duties in the capital), as well as the Operational Command and General Staff which are the main decisional organs in the chain of command. As of 2022, the unit also has a Criminal Directorate acting as an intelligence gathering unit for cybersecurity purposes.

== History ==
The Polish Military Gendarmerie is a military police force that traces its history to the communist-era Military Internal Service (Wojskowa Służba Wewnętrzna), World War II-era Service for Protection of the Uprising (Wojskowa Służba Ochrony Powstania), interwar-era military police in the Second Polish Republic, formations of the January and November Uprising, Duchy of Warsaw and finally, some officials of the Polish-Lithuanian Commonwealth, first created in early 17th century.

The modern Polish Military Gendarmerie was formed on 1 September 1990 on the basis of order No. Pf-42 / Org. Minister of National Defense of 18 April 1990 and order No. 062 / Org. Chief of the General Staff of the Polish Army of 15 June 1990. At this formation the structure was as follows:

- Headquarters of the Military Police in Warsaw
- Military Police Command:
  - Warsaw Military District
  - Pomeranian Military District
  - Silesian Military District

In addition, the following Military Gendarmerie Departments were established: Warsaw, Kraków, Bydgoszcz, Szczecin, Wrocław and Poznań, and also the Military Gendarmerie Training Center in Mińsk Mazowiecki.

In August 2001, Sejm (lower house of parliament of Poland) passed Act on the Military Gendarmerie and other law enforcement authorities which specify tasks and authorities of the Military Gendarmerie.

In 2007, the Military Gendarmerie was granted partner status to the European Gendarmerie Force, and since 2015 become a full member.

=== Role in civilian policing ===
In October 2020, the Military Gendarmerie were ordered to help the civilian police in the "protection of safety and public order", starting from 28 October 2020. The order was given in the context of the COVID-19 pandemic in Poland. Since the beginning of the pandemic, the ŻW has taken an increasingly public and pervasive role in the policing of society, often supplementing or fully overtaking the traditional roles of the national Police force.

Among other notable role changes and developments in the last two years, the ŻW has overtaken all duties on patrolling the highways and national roads to inspect the goods of large trucks and their roadworthiness, and for the first time arrest powers were extended to the ŻW when dealing with truck drivers who carry unregistered arms, drugs or illegal immigrants which fall out of the jurisdiction zones of the border force.

In urban areas, local ŻW units have been signposted to augment the local police in carrying out pedestrianised patrols and fining drivers who do not follow pedestrian-priority road laws. It also appears that ŻW has begun to augment the police and fire services in search operations – ŻW equipment and personnel have begun to be deployed to search for missing persons. In the past, ŻW units have been regularly deployed for this purpose to search for deserters and conscription-avoiders and much experience remains in this area.

Most visibly to the public eye however is the expansion of use of ŻW units in protection of public events and gatherings. ŻW units have been increasingly regularly deployed to supplement or overtake the roles of the national police in overseeing public events, gatherings and sports events. Notably however, they have been excluded from protests (from which they are constitutionally banned) and VIP/government protection (unlike other Gendarmerie forces in Spain and France, however, in Poland this role is undertaken by the SOP).

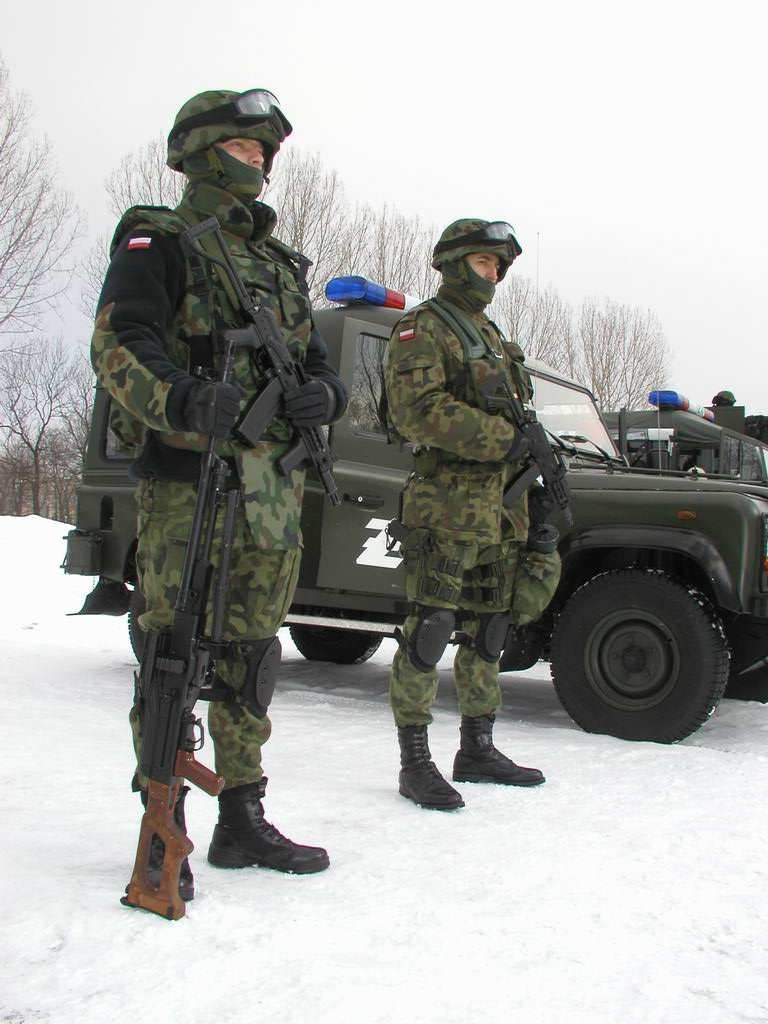
Two military police officers and a four-wheel drive police car from the Żandarmeria Wojskowa.

== Structure ==
The ŻW is organized into:

- Headquarters
- 3 special units
- 10 units
- 2 departments
- 45 regional stations

=== Commanders ===
The current commander is płk (Colonel) Tomasz Kajzer.

- gen. bryg. (Brigadier General) Jerzy Jarosz (1 IX 1990 – 20 II 1992)
- Płk dypl. (Certified Officer) Henryk Piątkowski (11 III 1992 – 1 IV 1993)
- gen. bryg. (Brigadier General) Alfons Kupis (1 IV 1993 – 24 VII 2000)
- gen. dyw. (Divisional General) Jerzy Słowiński (1 VIII 2000 – 30 VII 2003)
- gen. dyw. (Divisional General) Bogusław Pacek (31 VII 2003 – 3 X 2006)
- gen. dyw. (Divisional General) Jan Żukowski (3 X 2006 – 1 I 2008)
- gen. bryg. (Brigadier General) Marek Witczak (2 I 2008 – 17 XII 2010)
- gen. bryg. (Brigadier General) Mirosław Rozmus (17 XII 2010 - 11 VI 2015)
- gen. bryg. (Brigadier General) Piotr Nidecki (12 VI 2015 - 24 XII 2015)
- gen. bryg./gen. dyw. (Brigadier General/Divisional General) Tomasz Połuch (24 XII 2015 - 14 II 2024)
- płk (Colonel) Tomasz Kajzer (14 II 2024 - present)

== Ranks ==
Officers

NATO code	OF-10	OF-9	OF-8	OF-7	OF-6	OF-5	OF-4	OF-3	OF-2	OF-1
Żandarmeria wojskowa
Żandarmeria wojskowa					Generał brygady	Pułkownik	Podpułkownik	Major	Kapitan	Porucznik	Podporucznik

Enlisted

NATO code	OR-9		OR-8	OR-7	OR-6	OR-5	OR-4	OR-3		OR-2	OR-1
Żandarmeria wojskowa
Żandarmeria wojskowa	Starszy chorąży sztabowy	Starszy chorąży	Chorąży		Młodszy chorąży	Starszy sierżant	Sierżant	Plutonowy	Starszy kapral	Kapral	Starszy szeregowy	Szeregowy

== Equipment ==
=== Infantry weapons ===
Model	Image	Origin	Type	Variant	Number	Details
Glock 17		Austria	9 mm Para Semi-Auto Pistol	Glock 17	1,500	
PM-84 Glauberyt		Poland	9 mm Para Submachine Gun	PM-98 PM-06		
MP5		Germany	9 mm Para Submachine Gun	MP5A3		
Mossberg 500		United States	12 gauge	M50440		
Kbk wz. 1996 Mini-Beryl		Poland	5.56mm NATO Carbine	wz. 1996B wz. 1996C		
UKM-2000		Poland	7.62mm NATO general purpose machine gun	UKM-2000P UKM-2000D		
Sako TRG		Finland	7.62mm NATO Sniper Rifle	TRG-22		

=== Vehicles ===
Model	Image	Origin	Type	Variant	Number	Details
Land Rover Defender		United Kingdom	Four-wheel Multi-Purpose Drive Vehicle		100	
AMZ Łoś		Italy; Poland	4x4 truck			
Skoda Octavia		Czech Republic	Intervention vehicle			
Opel Vivaro		Germany	Van			
Ford Transit		United States	Van			
Opel Insignia		Germany	Patrol car			
Yamaha FZ6		Japan	Motorcycle			

== Members who have died in service ==
Soldiers of the Military Police died during their official duties:

- Starszy kapral Krzysztof Sypień from the Military Gendarmerie Department in Kraków, † 11 VIII 2002 Kraków, posthumously promoted to platoon-leader.
- Starszy szeregowy Grzegorz Bukowski from the Special Branch of the Military Police in Mińsk Mazowiecki, † 15 June 2010 Afghanistan, posthumously promoted to the rank of Corporal.
- Starszy szeregowy Marcin Pastusiak from the Special Branch of the Military Police in Mińsk Mazowiecki, † 22 January 2011 Afghanistan, posthumously promoted to the rank of Sergeant.
- Starszy szeregowy Tomasz Janowski from the Special Branch of the Military Police in Gdynia, † 29 March 2016 Iraq, posthumously promoted to the rank of Sergeant.

== See also ==
- European Gendarmerie Force
