= Public Security Service (Lithuania) =

Public Security Service Viešojo saugumo tarnyba
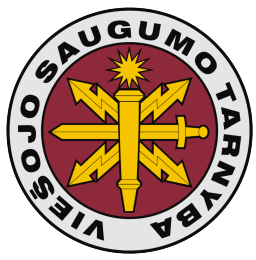
- Abbreviation: VST

Agency overview
- Formed: 18 October 1991; 35 years ago

Jurisdictional structure
- Operations jurisdiction: Lithuania
- Governing body: Ministry of the Interior
- Constituting instrument: Law on the Public Security Service 2006

Operational structure
- Headquarters: M. K. Paco str. 4, 10309 Vilnius

Website
- vstarnyba.lrv.lt/en

The Public Security Service or VST (Lithuanian: Viešojo saugumo tarnyba) is a Lithuanian law enforcement agency under the Ministry of the Interior. It is primarily involved in restoring the public order and serving as the main riot police force equipped for riot control as well as critical infrastructure protection. The VST also assists Lithuanian law enforcement in rescuing hostages.

VST is a member of the European Gendarmerie Force. Similarly to gendarmeries in other states, VST is a paramilitary organization which has greater combat capability than the regular police. During the state of war, VST becomes directly subordinate to the Lithuanian Armed Forces.

== History ==
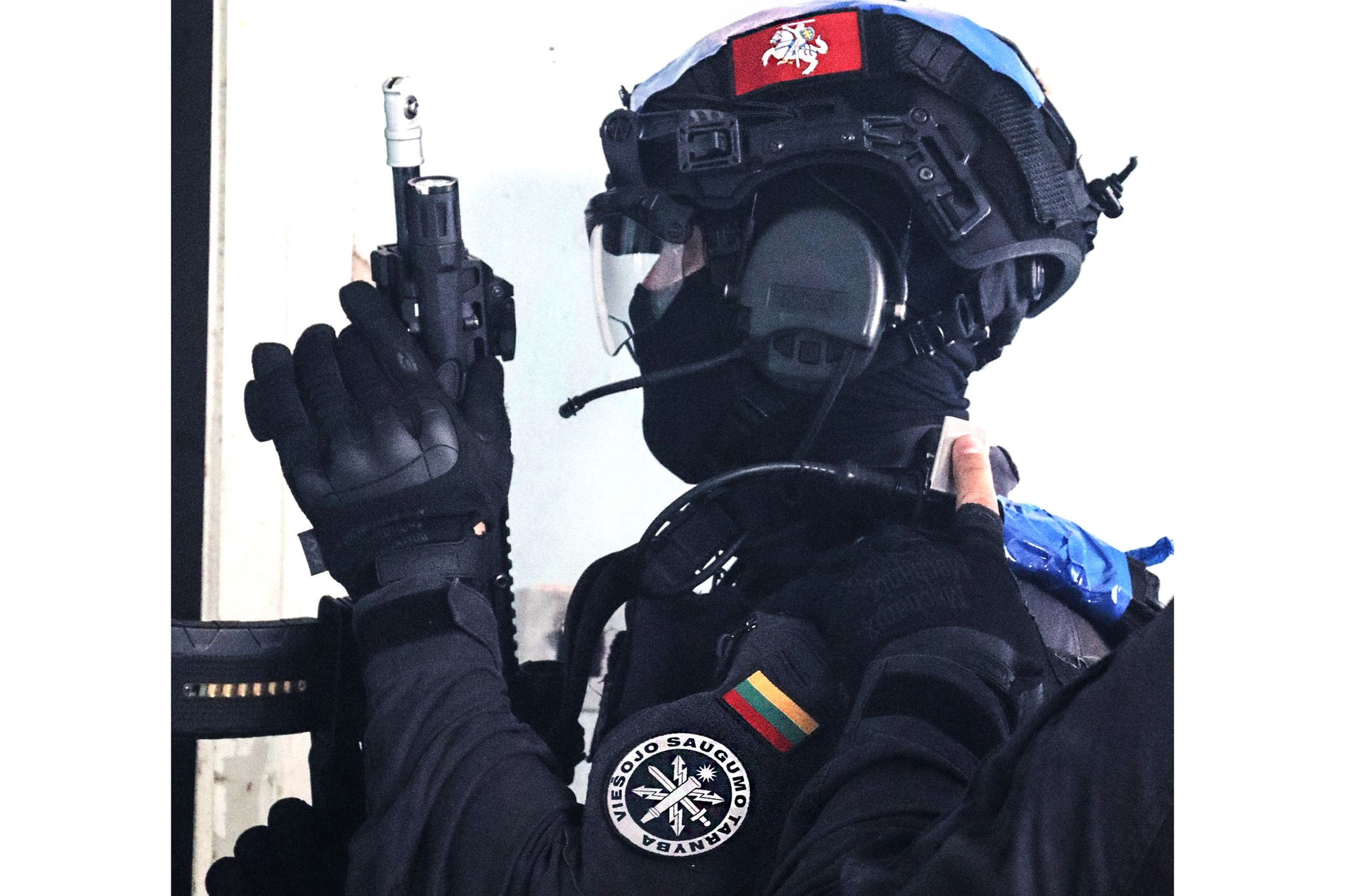
ORKA unit operator

The origins of the special purpose law enforcement can be traced back to the armed formations of the Lithuanian Tribunal in the 17th century, specifically the Infantry Company of the Lithuanian Tribunal. The modern precursor of the institution was the Territorial Army Brigade (Vietinės kariuomenės brigada) established in February 1920 and disbanded in 1923.

The current institution was formed on 18 October 1991 and was known as the Internal Service Unit (Vidaus tarnyba) until 2002 when, following its reorganization, it was renamed to the Public Security Service. The institution is regulated by the 2006 Law on the Public Security Service.

In May 2025, the VST reported that another ORKA unit will be formed in Vilnius.

== Organization ==
As of 2026, the service consists of the following units:

- Command ant Control units:
  - Joint Operations Center
- Mobile units:
  - Vilnius Unit
    - Rapid Response Group (GRG)
    - 1st Company (3 squads)
    - 2nd Company (4 squads)
    - 3rd Company (4 squads)
    - 4th Company (4 squads)
  - Kaunas Unit
    - 1st Company (3 squads)
    - 2nd Company (3 squads)
    - 3rd Company (4 squads)
    - 4th Company (4 squads)
  - Klaipėda Unit
    - 1st Company (3 squads)
    - 2nd Company (2 squads)
  - Visaginas Unit
    - 1st Company (2 squads)
    - 2nd Company (3 squads, with the 3rd being K9)
    - 3rd Company (3 squads)
  - Operational Response Counterattack Team (ORKA) (4 squads)
- Support units:
  - Training and Сombat Training Center
  - Direct Force Support Command (Special Vehicles Center and the Tactical Support, Communication Support, and Logistics division)
  - Budget Execution and Procurement Command (Finance and Accounting Division, Public Procurement Division)
  - Internal Investigations and Corruption Prevention Division
  - Staff (has the following divisions: Activities and Operations Organization, International Cooperation and Informational Support, General, Human Resources Management, Law, Development Planning)

== Ranks ==
Officers

NATO code	OF-10	OF-9	OF-8	OF-7	OF-6	OF-5	OF-4	OF-3	OF-2	OF-1
Lithuanian Public Security Service
Lithuanian Public Security Service					Generolas	Pulkininkas	Pulkininkas leitenantas	Majoras	Kapitonas	Vyresnysis leitenantas	Leitenantas

Other ranks

NATO code	OR-9	OR-8	OR-7	OR-6	OR-5	OR-4	OR-3	OR-2	OR-1
Lithuanian Public Security Service
Lithuanian Public Security Service			Vyresnysis puskarininkis	Puskarininkis	Jaunesnysis puskarininkis	Grandinis

== Equipment ==
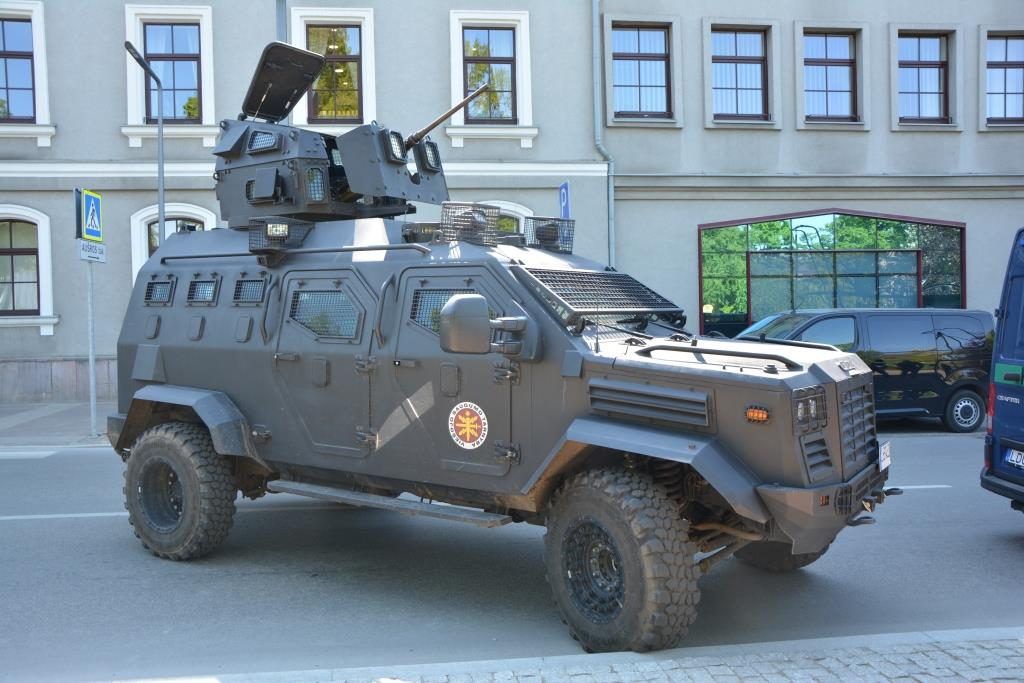
IAG Guardian used by the VST

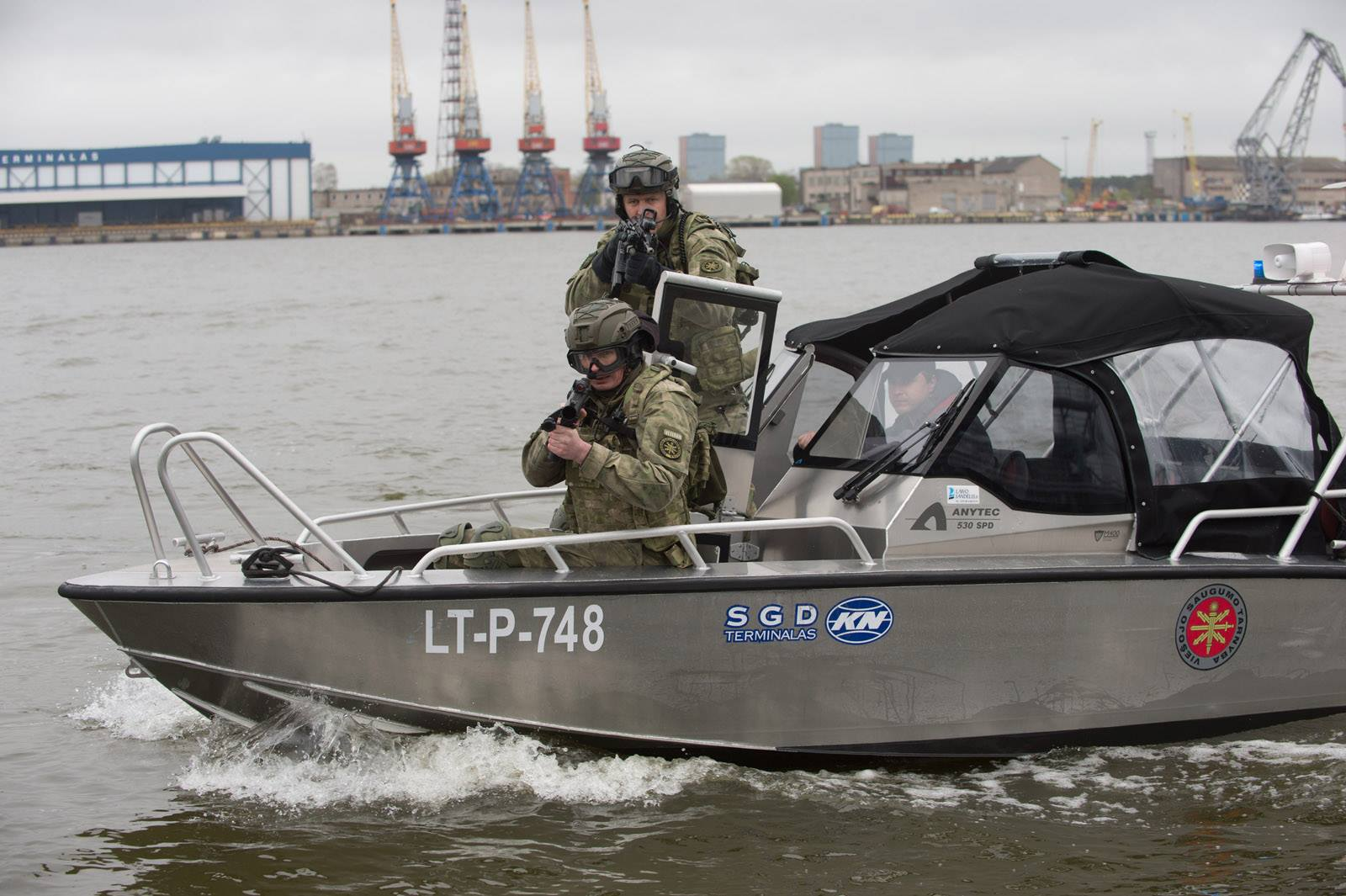
VST officers in the Port of Klaipėda exercises

Some of the VST equipment includes:

- Volkswagen Crafter vans, Iveco EuroCargo and Mercedes-Benz Atego transporters (used for convoy and prisoner transport)
- IAG Guardian and INKAS Sentry armoured personnel carriers

== See also ==
- National Guard
