= List of people and organizations sanctioned during the Russo-Ukrainian war =

Various sanctions against Russia and its affiliates have been imposed by major economic and political powers in response to the Russian invasion of Ukraine, including the United States, the member states of the European Union (EU), and other international organizations.

In response, Russia has imposed its own sanctions against other countries, which include a complete ban on food imports from Australia, Canada, Norway, the United States, and the European Union.

== By Canada, the United Kingdom, the United States, the European Union and Australia ==
=== Prior to 2022 invasion ===
The European Union, United States, and Canada imposed an initial round of sanctions on 17 March 2014, and, on 11 April, Albania, Iceland and Montenegro announced that they would be following suit. On 28 April, the US expanded its sanctions to include 17 Russian companies, with Japan, Canada, and Australia, taking similar actions soon thereafter.

The EU also joined the 28 April sanctions and, in addition, instructed the European Investment Bank and the European Bank for Reconstruction and Development to suspend the signature of new financing operations in Russia. The EU continued to expand the scope and duration of its sanctions over the following months, agreeing to extend the existing sanctions on 150 individuals and 38 companies for another six months in March 2018. The EU also added five individuals—Natalya Ivanovna Berzruchenko, Inna Nikolayevna Guzeyeva, Aleksandr Yurevich Petukhov, Miroslav Aleksandrovich Pogorelov, and Anastasiya Nikolayevna Karpranova—to their sanctions lists for their involvement with, and organization of, the March 2018 Russia presidential elections in Crimea and Sevastopol that May.

Switzerland, although not an EU member, mirrored the Union's sanctions, a historic deviation from the country's stance of semi-complete political and wartime neutrality, citing a "serious violation of the most fundamental norms of international law within the scope of its political room for manoeuver."

New Zealand imposed "largely symbolic" sanctions in May 2014, and in September 2014, Australia placed Russia, Crimea, and Sevastopol on the Australian autonomous sanctions list in response to the Russian threat to the sovereignty and territorial integrity of Ukraine, while Japan sanctioned Russian military-related technology and five major Russian banks (VTB Bank, Sberbank, Gazprombank, Vnesheconombank, and the Russian Agricultural Bank).

Since first imposing its sanctions in 2014, the US has expanded them several times, including in December 2015 and April 2018.

As of 24 May 2018, Ukraine's sanctions list named more than 1000 individuals and more than 400 entities.

=== After 2022 invasion ===
==== Personal sanctions ====
Representative	Name	(United States) (Note: US references:)	(European Union) (United Kingdom) (Norway) (Note: EU references: UK included with EU; all individuals and businesses confirmed by Ukraine section here:)	(Albania) (Iceland) (Liechtenstein) (Montenegro)	(Canada) (Note: Canada references:)	(Switzerland) (Note: Swiss references:)	(Australia) (Note: Australian references:)	(Japan)	Title/Remarks
Russia	Vladimir Putin								President of Russia
Russia	Mikhail Mishustin								Prime Minister of Russia
Russia	Sergey Lavrov								Minister of Foreign Affairs of Russia
Russia	Sergei Shoigu								Minister of Defence of Russia
Russia	Dmitry Medvedev								Deputy Chairman of the Security Council of Russia, former president and former prime minister of Russia
Belarus	Alexander Lukashenko								President of Belarus
Belarus	Roman Golovchenko								Prime Minister of Belarus
Belarus	Viktor Khrenin								Minister of Defence of Belarus
Crimea	Sergey Abisov								Minister of Internal Affairs of the Republic of Crimea
Russia	Valeri Abramov								Linked to VAD, AO
Ukraine	Larisa Airapetyan								Minister of Health of the Luhansk People's Republic
Ukraine	Oleg Akimov								Deputy of the Luhansk Economic Union in the National Council
Russia	Andrey Akimov								Chairman of management board of Gazprombank
Crimea	Sergey Aksyonov								Head of the Republic of Crimea
Russia	Victor Anosov								Member of insurgent group near Slovyansk
Russia	Vladimir Potanin								Co-owner of Nornickel (Norilsk Nickel)
Crimea	Anna Vladimirovna Anyukhina								Minister for Property and Land Relations of the Republic of Crimea
Russia	Igor Antipov								Minister of Information of the Donetsk People's Republic
Russia	Anatoly Antonov								Ambassador of Russia to the United States, former Deputy Minister of Foreign Affairs, former Deputy Minister of Defense
Russia	Patriarch Kirill of Moscow, secular name Vladimir Mikhailovich Gundyayev		(UK)						Patriarch of Moscow and all Rus' and Primate of the Russian Orthodox Church
Russia	Vladimir Antyufeyev, also known as Vladim Shevtsov or Vladimir Shevtsov								Former chairman of the People's Council of the Donetsk People's Republic; former head of the Ministry of State Security of unrecognized Transnistria, wanted by law enforcement agencies of Latvia and Moldova.
Russia	Viacheslav Apraksimov								Member of insurgent group near Slovyansk
Ukraine	Serhiy Arbuzov								Former acting prime minister of Ukraine, former deputy prime minister of Ukraine
Ukraine	Mykola Azarov								Former Prime Minister of Ukraine
Ukraine	Oleksiy Azarov								Son of former prime minister of Ukraine Mykola Azarov
Russia	Alexander Babakov								Member of the State Duma
Iran	Mohammad Bagheri								Chief of Staff of the Islamic Republic of Iran Armed Forces
Crimea	Konstantin Bakharev								Member of the State Duma
Russia	Arkady Bakhin								First Deputy Minister of Defence, former Commander of the Western Military District
Crimea	Ruslan Balbek								Former Member of the State Duma
Russia	Marat Bashirov								Acting prime minister of People's Republic of Luhansk
Ukraine	Eduard Basurin								Deputy Commander of the Ministry of Defense of the Donetsk People's Republic
Russia	Oleg Belaventsev								Former Plenipotentiary Representative to the North Caucasian Federal District, and former Plenipotentiary Representative to the Crimean Federal District Russian envoy overseeing Crimea
Crimea	Dmitry Belik								Member of the State Duma, representing Sevastopol, and the Committee for Control and Regulation
Russia	Andrey Belousov								First Deputy Prime Minister of Russia
Russia	Oleg Belozyorov								Chief executive officer of Russian Railways
Ukraine	Oleg Bereza								Minister of Interior for the Donetsk People's Republic
Russia	Fyodor Berezin								Russian science fiction writer, deputy of Igor Girkin
Ukraine	Denis Berezovsky								Defected commander of the Ukrainian Navy
Ukraine	Natalya Ivanovna Berzruchenko								Deputy Chairwoman of Crimea Electoral Commission during March 2018 elections
Russia	Sergey Beseda								Colonel General Federal Security Service (FSB) & Commander of the Fifth Service
Ukraine	Olga Besedina								Minister of Economic Development and Trade of the Luhansk People's Republic
Ukraine	Ihor Kolomoyskyi								Former governor of Dnipropetrovsk Oblast
Ukraine	Igor Bezler								One of the leaders of the self-defense militia of Horlivka
Russia	Vladimir Bogdanov								Russian businessman
Russia	Nikolay Bogdanovsky								Former Commander of the Central Military District
Ukraine	Raisa Bohatyriova								Former Minister of Healthcare of Ukraine, former Member of the Verkhovna Rada
Ukraine	Valery Bolotov(d. 2017)								Former Head of the Luhansk People's Republic
Russia	Alexander Borodai								Member of the State Duma, former prime minister of the Donetsk People's Republic
Russia	Alexander Bortnikov								Director of the Federal Security Service
Ukraine	Oleg Bugrov								Former Defense Minister of the Luhansk People's Republic
Russia	Dmitry Bulgakov								Deputy Minister of Defense, former Head of the Logistical Support of the Russian Armed Forces
Crimea	Vadim Viktorovich Bulgakov								Head of Federal Penitentiary Service of Sevastopol
Russia	Andrey Bulyutin								Providing material support to the Kalashnikov Concern
Russia	Yevgeny Bushmin(d. 2019)								Deputy Chairman of the Federation Council
Crimea	Aleksei Chaly								Governor of Sevastopol, Chief of the executive committee of the Sevastopol City Council
Russia	Sergey Chemezov								CEO of Rostec
Russia	Andrey Vladimirovich Cherezov								Deputy Minister of Energy for Russia Federation in the Department of Operational Control and Management for Electric Power; supports power supply for Crimea and Sevastopol that is independent of Ukraine
Russia	Dmitry Chernyshenko								Deputy Prime Minister of Russia
Russia	Konstantin Chuychenko								Minister of Justice
Russia	Mikhail Degtyarev								Governor of Khabarovsk Krai, former Member of the State Duma
Belarus	Dmitry Demidov								Municipal chief in Vitsebsk region
Russia	Oleg Deripaska								Russian businessman
Ukraine	Vladyslav Nykolayevych Deynego								Deputy Head of the People's Council of the unrecognized Luhansk People's Republic.
Ukraine	Mykhailo Dobkin								Former member of the Verkhovna Rada, former governor of Kharkiv Oblast, former mayor of Kharkiv, Chairman of the Party of Regions Kharkiv division
Russia	Larisa Dolina								Russian jazz and pop singer and actress.
Ukraine	Pavel Dryomov(d. 2015)								Commander of the "First Cossack Regiment", an armed separatist group involved in the fighting in eastern Ukraine.
Russia	Aleksandr Dugin								Leader of the Eurasian Youth Union organization
Russia	Aleksandr Dvornikov								Former Commander of the Southern Military District, former acting Commander of the Central Military District
Russia	Vladimir Dzhabarov								Member of the Federation Council
Ukraine	Ekaterina Filippova								Former Minister of Justice of the Donetsk People's Republic
Russia	Mikhail Fradkov								Director of the Russian Institute for Strategic Studies, former Head of the Foreign Intelligence Service, former prime minister of Russia,
Russia	Sergey Frank								Chairman of Sovcomflot, former Minister of Transport
Russia	Andrei Fursenko								Aide to the president of Russia, former Minister of Education and Science
Russia	Aleksandr Galkin								Former Commander of the Southern Military District
Russia	Valery Gerasimov								First Deputy Minister of Defence - Chief of the General Staff of the Armed Forces of Russia
Russia	Igor Girkin, aka Igor Ivanovich Strelkov								Former Minister of Defence of the Donetsk People's Republic
Russia	Sergey Glazyev								Presidential Adviser to Vladimir Putin
Russia	Matvey Gorokhin								Owner of Freight One through JSC Aurora Invest
Russia	Evgeniy Petrovich Grabchak								Deputy Minister of Energy for Russia Federation, Chief of the Department of Operational Control and Management of Electric Power; supports power supply for Crimea and Sevastopol that is independent of Ukraine
Russia	Alexey Gromov								Deputy Chief of Staff of the Presidential Administration of Russia
Russia	Boris Gryzlov								Ambassador to Belarus, Chairman of the Supreme Council of United Russia, former chairman of the State Duma, former Minister of Internal Affairs
Ukraine	Pavel Gubarev								People's governor of the Donetsk People's Republic
Ukraine	Ekaterina Gubareva								Deputy Head of the Kherson Military-Civilian Administration, former Minister of Foreign Affairs of the Donetsk People's Republic
Russia	Andrey Guryev								Founder & CEO of PhosAgro
Ukraine	Inna Nikolayevna Guzeyeva								Secretary of Crimea Electoral Commission during March 2018 elections
Iran	Amir Ali Hajizadeh								Commander of the Islamic Revolutionary Guard Corps Aerospace Force
Russia	Vitaly Ignatenko								First Deputy Chairman of the Federation Council on Committee for Foreign Affairs
Ukraine	Sergey Ignatov								Commander in Chief of the People's Militia of Luhansk People's Republic
Russia	Ruslan Ilkaev								Member of insurgent group near Slovyansk
Russia	Eduard Ioffe								Deputy General Director of Kalashnikov Concern
Ukraine	Zaur Ismailov								Acting General Prosecutor of Luhansk People's Republic
Russia	Yuriy Ivakin								Minister of Internal Affairs for the People's Republic of Luhansk
Russia	Sergei Ivanov(d. 2026)								Chief of Staff of the Presidential Administration of Russia, Former First Deputy Prime Minister, former Minister of Defense, former Secretary of the Security Council
Russia	Viktor Ivanov								Former Director of the Federal Drug Control Service of Russia
Ukraine	Yuriy Ivanyushchenko								Former Member of the Verkhovna Rada
Russia	Petr Jarosh								Acting Head of Russian Federal Migration Service for Republic of Crimea
Russia	Ramzan Kadyrov								Head of the Chechen Republic
Russia	Maria Lavrova								Wife of Minister of Foreign Affairs Sergey Lavrov
Belarus	Galina Lukashenko								First Lady of Belarus
Belarus	Viktor Lukashenko								Son of President of Belarus
Ukraine	Igor Khakidzyanov								Former Defense Minister of the Donetsk People's Republic
Russia	Leonid Kalashnikov								Member of the State Duma
Ukraine	Ihor Kalinin								Former Advisor to the president of UkraineFormer Head of the Security Service of Ukraine; former Head of the Security Service of Ukraine; Head of State Security Administration of Ukraine (UDO)
Russia	Alexander Kalyussky								de facto "Deputy Prime Minister for Social Affairs of the Donetsk People's Republic"
Crimea	Oleg Kamshylov								Prosecutor General of the Republic of Crimea
North Korea	Kang Sun-nam								Minister of Defence of North Korea
Russia	Pavel Kanishchev								A leader of the Eurasian Youth Union
Ukraine	Anastasiya Nikolayevna Kapranova								Secretary of Sevastopol Electoral Commission during March 2018 elections
Russia	Aleksandr Karaman								Former foreign minister of the People's Republic of Donetsk, former vice president of Transnistria
Russia	Vakhtang Karamyan								Business Development Director of Kalashnikov Concern
Russia	Andrey Kartapolov								Member of the State Duma, former Deputy Minister of Defense, former Commander of the Western Military District
Ukraine	Aleksey Karyakin								Former Supreme Council Chair of the Luhansk People's Republic; asked the Russian Federation to recognize the independence of the Luhansk People's Republic.
Ukraine	Valery Kaurov								Former president of the effectively defunct Federal State of Novorossiya; asked Russia to deploy troops to Ukraine.
Russia	Said Kerimov								Russian businessman, son of Suleyman Kerimov
Russia	Suleyman Kerimov								Member of the Federation Council
Ukraine	Hennadiy Kernes(d. 2020)								Mayor of Kharkiv
Ukraine	Ravil Khalikov								First Deputy Prime Minister and previous Prosecutor General of the unrecognized Donetsk People's Republic
Syria	Ahmed Khalil								Co-owner of the Sanad Protection and Security Services
Ukraine	Alexander Khodakovsky								Minister of Security of the Donetsk People's Republic
Ukraine	Alexander Khryakov								Information and Mass Communications Minister of the Donetsk People's Republic
Russia	Dmitry Kiselyov								Head of the Russian Federal State News Agency Rossiya Segodnya
Russia	Andrey Klishas								Member of the Federation Council of Russia.
Ukraine	Andriy Klyuyev								Former Head of Administration of President of Ukraine
Ukraine	Serhiy Klyuyev								Former Member of the Verkhovna Rada
Ukraine	Oleksandr Klymenko								Former Minister of Revenues and Duties of Ukraine
Russia	Joseph Kobzon(d. 2018)								Member of the State Duma, singer
Ukraine	Aleksandr Kofman								First deputy speaker of the Parliament of the unrecognized Donetsk People's Republic
Russia	Pyotr Kolbin								Providing material support to Gennady Timchenko
Ukraine	Borys Kolesnikov								Former Minister of Infrastructure of Ukraine; Businessman
Georgia; France	Bidzina Ivanishvili								Georgian oligarch financed by Russia; his account is frozen
Ukraine	Yuriy Kolobov								Former Minister of Finance of Ukraine
Ukraine	Vladimir Kononov								Defense Minister of Donetsk People's Republic
Crimea	Vladimir Konstantinov								Chairman of the State Council of Crimea
Russia	Igor Kornet								Minister of Interior for Luhansk People's Republic
Ukraine	Ihor Vladymyrovych Kostenok								Minister of Education of the Donetsk People's Republic
Russia	Yury Kovalchuk								Chairman of largest shareholder of Bank Rossiya; according to the US, "a personal banker for senior officials of the Russian Federation including Putin".
Russia	Andrey Kovalenko								A leader of the Eurasian Youth Union
Crimea	Olga Kovitidi								Member of the Federation Council
Russia	Dmitry Kozak								Deputy Prime Minister
Crimea	Andrey Kozenko								Member of the State Duma representing Crimea and on Committee for Financial Markets
Russia	Vladimir Kozhin								Member of the Federation Council, former Head of Administration under the president of the Russian Federation
Ukraine	Nikolai Kozitsyn								Commander of Cossack forces. Responsible for or complicit in, or has engaged in, actions or policies that threaten the peace, security, stability, sovereignty, or territorial integrity of Ukraine.
Ukraine	Sergey Kozlov								Prime minister of Luhansk People's Republic
Ukraine	Serhiy Kozyakov								Head of the Luhansk Central Election Commission of the unrecognized Luhansk People's Republic
Crimea	Oleg Kozyura								Acting Head of the Federal Migration Service office for Sevastopol
Russia	Valery Kulikov								Former Member of the Federation Council, former Rear Admiral, Deputy Commander of the Russian Black Sea Fleet
Ukraine	Serhiy Kurchenko								Businessman
Ukraine	Lesya Lapteva								Minister of Education, Science, Culture and Religion of the unrecognized Luhansk People's Republic
Russia	Dmitri Lebedev								CEO of Bank Rossiya
Russia	Igor Lebedev								Former Member of the State Duma
Russia	Oleg Lebedev								Former Member of the State Duma, First Deputy Chairman of the Committee on Relations with the CIS countries
Russia	Nikolai Levichev								Former Leader of A Just Russia Party
Ukraine	Sergey Litvin								Deputy Chairman of the Council of Ministers of the unrecognized Luhansk People's Republic
Ukraine	Boris Litvinov								Chairman of the Supreme Council of the unrecognized Donetsk People's Republic
Ukraine	Olena Lukash								Former Minister of Justice of Ukraine
Russia	Maria Lvova-Belova								Children's Rights Commissioner for the President of Russia, former Member of the Federation Council,
Ukraine	Roman Lyagin								Businessman who advocated for the creation of Federal Republic of Novorossiya
Russia	Konstantin Malofeev								Owner of Tsargrad TV, Under criminal investigation by Ukraine on his alleged material and financial support to separatists
Ukraine	Aleksandr Malykhin								Head of the Lugansk People's Republic Central Electoral Commission
Crimea	Mikhail Malyshev								De facto Chair of the Crimea Electoral Commission
Ukraine	Evgeny Manuilov								Minister of Budget in the unrecognized Donetsk People's Republic
Russia	Mikhail Margelov								Chairman of the Federation Council Committee for Foreign Affairs
Russia	Valentina Matviyenko								Chairman of the Federation Council
Russia	Dmitry Mazepin								Majority owner of Uralchem, in turn a minority shareholder in Uralkali
Russia	Nikita Mazepin								Ex-Formula One racing driver, son of Dmitry
Ukraine	Viktor Medvedchuk		(at least by the UK)						Ukrainian oligarch, former Member of the Verkhonva Rada
Crimea	Valery Medvedev								De facto Chair of the Sevastopol Electoral Commission
Russia	Andrey Melnichenko								Founder of EuroChem
Russia	Andrei Melnikov								Minister of Economic Development of the Republic of Crimea
Russia	Ivan Melnikov								First Deputy Chairman of Duma, Member of the State Duma
Crimea	Sergey Menyaylo								Head of North Ossetia-Alania, former Pleneponteiery Representative of the Siberian Federal District, former governor of Sevastopol
Russia	Yevgeny Mikhailov								Head of the administration for governmental affairs of the Donetsk People's Republic, former Assistant to the Kremlin Chief of Staff, former governor of Pskov Oblast, former Member of the Federation Council, former Member of the State Duma
Russia	Vladimir Mikheychik								General director of the 224th Flight Unit State Airlines
Russia	Alexey Milchakov, also known as Serbian or Fritz								Commander of the 'Rusich' unit, an armed separatist group involved in the fighting in eastern Ukraine.
Russia	Sergey Mironov								Leader of the Russian Parliament faction A Just Russia
Russia	Inna Mironova								Wife of Sergey Mironov
Russia	Mikhail Mizintsev								Russian General with the nickname "Butcher of Mariupol"
Russia	Yelena Mizulina								Member of the Federation Council of the A Just Russia party
Ukraine	Aleksey Mozgovoy(d. 2015)								Commander of the separatist Prizrak Brigade
Crimea	Georgiy Muradov								Deputy Prime Minister of Crimea. Permanent Representative of the Republic of Crimea to the Russian Federation, former Ambassador of Russia to Cyprus
Russia	Yevgeny Murov								Former Head of Russian Federal Protective Service
Russia	Valerii Musiienko								Member of insurgent group near Slovyansk
Russia	Sergey Naryshkin								Director of the Foreign Intelligence Service, former chairman of the State Duma, former Member of the State Duma
Russia	Aleksey Naumets								Major-General in the Russian Army, commanded 76th Airborne division operating in Ukraine and operating during Russia annexation of Crimea
Crimea	Dmitry Neklyudov								Deputy Minister of Interior of the de facto "Republic of Crimea"
Russia	Sergey Neverov								Deputy Chairman of the State Duma, United Russia
Uzbekistan	Vasily Nikitin								Vice Prime Minister of the Council of Ministers of the Luhansk People's Republic, (used to be the prime minister of the Luhansk People's Republic, and former spokesman of the Army of the Southeast).
Russia	Vladimir Nikitin								Member of the State Duma, voted in favour of the draft Federal Constitutional Law 'on the acceptance into the Russian Federation of the Republic of Crimea and the formation within the Russian Federation of new federal subjects — the republic of Crimea and the City of Federal Status Sevastopol'
Russia	Natalya Nikonorova								Foreign Minister of the Donetsk People's Republic
Russia	Aleksandr Nosatov								Rear Admiral, Deputy Commander of the Russian Black Sea Fleet
Russia	Rashid Nurgaliyev								Russia's interior minister from 2003 to 2012
Sweden	Sven Olsson								Swedish lawyer on board of directors of Volga Group, associated with Gennady Timchenko
Russia	Aleksander Anatolyevich Omelchenko								Chief Export Officer for Kalashnikov Concern
Russia	Azatbek Omurbekov								Former commander of the 64th Separate Motor Rifle Brigade. Nicknamed as "Butcher of Bucha".
Ukraine	Yevgeniy Vyacheslavovich Orlov								Member of the National Council of the unrecognized Donetsk's People's Republic.
Russia	Dmitry Ovsyannikov								Former Governor of Sevastopol.
Russia	Viktor Ozerov								Former Member of the Federation Council of Russia, former chairman of the Legislative Duma of Khabarovsk Krai
Finland	Kai Paananen								Providing material support to Gennady Timchenko
Russia	Ella Pamfilova								Head of the Central Election Commission
Russia	Oleg Panteleyev(d. 2016)								Member of the Federation Council, First Deputy Chairman of the Committee on Parliamentary Issues
Russia	Nikolai Patrushev								Secretary of the Security Council of Russia, former Director of the Federal Security Service
Russia	Arseny Pavlov(d. 2016)								Commander of the 'Sparta Battalion', an armed separatist group involved in the fighting in eastern Ukraine.
Ukraine	Aleksandr Yurevich Petukhov								Chairman of Sevastopol Electoral Commission during March 2018 elections
Russia	Andrei Pinchuk								Former Minister for State Security of the Donetsk People's Republic
Russia	Vladimir Pligin								Member of the State Duma, Chairman of the State Duma Constitutional Law and Nation Building Committee
Ukraine	Igor Plotnitsky								Former Defence Minister and the former Head of the Lugansk People's Republic.
Ukraine	Miroslav Aleksandrovich Pogorelov								Deputy Chairman of Sevastopol Electoral Commission during March 2018 elections
Crimea	Natalia Poklonskaya								Advisor to the Prosecutor General of Russia, former ambassador to Cape Verde, former Member of the State Duma, former Prosecutor General of Crimea
Ukraine	Vyacheslav Ponomarev								De facto Mayor of Sloviansk
Ukraine	Andriy Portnov								Former Member of the Verkhovna Rada
Russia	Yevgeny Prigozhin(d. 2023)								Head of the Wagner Group, Materially assisted, sponsored, or provided financial, material, or technological support for, or goods or services in support of, senior officials of the Russian Federation; extensive business dealings with the Russian Federation Ministry of Defense, and a company with significant ties to him holds a contract to build a military base near the Russian Federation border with Ukraine. Russia has been building additional military bases near the Ukrainian border and has used these bases as staging points for deploying soldiers into Ukraine.
Ukraine	German Prokopiv								Active leader of the "Lugansk Guard"
Russia	Yurii Protsenko								Member of insurgent group near Sloviansk
Ukraine	Mykola Prysyazhnyuk								Former Minister of Agrarian Policy and Food of Ukraine
Ukraine	Artem Pshonka								Former Member of the Verkhonva Rada, son of former Prosecutor General Viktor Pshonka
Ukraine	Viktor Pshonka								Former Prosecutor General of Ukraine
Ukraine	Andriy Purhin								Chairman of the People's Council of the Donetsk People's Republic
Russia	Aleksey Pushkov								Member of the Federation Council, former Member of the State Duma, former chair of the State Duma's International Affairs Committee
Ukraine	Denis Pushilin								Head of the Donetsk People's Republic, former prime minister of the Donetsk People's Republic
Russia	Valery Rashkin								Former Member of the State Duma, First Deputy Chairman of the State Duma Committee on Ethnicity issues
Ukraine	Viktor Ratushnyak								Former Deputy Minister of Internal Affairs of Ukraine
Russia	Andrei Nikolaevich Rodkin								Moscow Representative of the Donetsk People's Republic
Russia	Dmitry Rogozin								Former Director General of Roscosmos, former Deputy Prime Minister of Russia, former Member of the State Duma
Russia	Arkady Rotenberg								Russian businessman
Russia; Finland	Boris Romanovich Rotenberg								Russian (-Finnish) businessman
Russia	Igor Rotenberg								Russian businessman
Russia; Finland	Roman Rotenberg								Russian (-Finnish) businessman
Ukraine	Miroslav Rudenko								Commanded the illegal Donbas People's Militia. Member of People's Council of Donetsk People's Republic
Russia	Nikolai Ryzhkov(d. 2024)								Member of the Federation Council, former Member of the State Duma
Iran	Saeed Aghajani								Islamic Revolutionary Guard Corps commander
Crimea	Petr Savchenko								Former Finance Minister of the Donetsk People's Republic
Crimea	Svetlana Savchenko								Former Member of the State Duma representing Crimea and on Committee for Culture
Russia	Oleg Savelyev								Minister for Crimean Affairs
Russia	Igor Sechin								Chief Executive Officer of Rosneft, former deputy prime minister of Russia, Advisor to Putin
Ukraine	Olena Semenova								Providing material support to the Kalashnikov Concern
Ukraine	Dmitry Semyonov								Deputy Prime Minister for Finances of the unrecognized Luhansk People's Republic
Russia	Andrey Serdyukov								Former Commander of the Russian Airborne Forces
Russia	Igor Sergun(d. 2016)								Director of Russian Military Intelligence
Russia	Kirill Shamalov								Russian businessman
Russia	Nikolai Shamalov								Second largest shareholder of Bank Rossiya
Russia	Vladimir Shamanov								Former Member of the State Duma, former governor of Ulyanovsk Oblast, former Commander of the Russian Airborne Troops
Belarus	Dzmitry Shautsou								General director of Belarus Red Cross
Russia	Igor Shchyogolev								Pleinopoteniary Representative to the Central Federal District, former Minister of Communications and Mass Media
Ukraine	Igor Shevchenko								Prosecutor of Sevastopol
Crimea	Mikhail Sheremet								Member of the State Duma
Crimea	Pavel Shperov								Former Member of the State Duma represents Crimea and on Committee for CIS Affairs, Eurasian Integration and Relations with Compatriots
Ukraine	Alexandr Shubin								Minister of Justice of the Luhansk People's Republic
Russia	Lyudmila Shvetsova(d. 2014)								Deputy Chairman of the State Duma, United Russia
Russia	Anatoly Sidorov								Former Commander of Western Military District
Ukraine	Yuriy Sivokonenko								Member of the Parliament of the unrecognized Donetsk People's Republic and works in the Union of veterans of the Donbas Berkut.
Russia	Andrei Skoch								Member of the State Duma
Russia	Leonid Slutsky								Member of the State Duma and the LDPR party
Ukraine; Israel	Eduard Stavytsky								Former Energy Minister of Ukraine
Russia	Vladislav Surkov								Close ally to Vladimir Putin
Ukraine	Dmytro Tabachnyk								Former Minister of Education and Science of Ukraine
Belarus	Aliaksei Talai								Founder of the Charitable Foundation Aleksey Talai
Ukraine	Oksana Tchigrina								Spokesperson of the unrecognized Lugansk People's Republic
Crimea	Rustam Temirgaliev								Deputy Chairman of the Council of Ministers of Crimea
Russia	Katerina Tikhonova								Daughter of President Vladimir Putin
Russia; Finland; Armenia	Gennady Timchenko								Russian (-Finnish) businessman
Ukraine	Alexander Timofeyev								Minister of Budget of the unrecognized Donetsk People's Republic
Russia	Aleksandr Tkachyov								Former governor of Krasnodar Krai and Minister of Agriculture
Ukraine	Mikhail Tolstykh(d. 2017)								Commander of the 'Somali' battalion, an armed separatist group involved in the fighting in eastern Ukraine
Russia	Sergey Anatolevich Topor-Gilka								Director general of Technopromexport (VO TPE), supports power supply in Crimea and Sevastopol independent of Ukraine
Russia	Aleksandr Totoonov								Member of the Federation Council of Russia
Ukraine	Oleg Tsarov								Creator of the Parliament of Novorossiya, former Member of the Verkhovna Rada
Crimea	Sergei Tsekov								Deputy Chairman of the Supreme Council of Crimea
Ukraine	Gennadiy Tsypkalov(d. 2016)								Former prime minister of the Luhansk People's Republic
Ukraine	Sergei Tsyplakov								One of the leaders of the People's Militia of Donbas
Russia	Igor Turchenyuk								Commander of the Russian forces in Crimea
Russia	Oleg Usachev								Providing material support to Gennady Timchenko
Russia	Yuri Ushakov								Foreign Policy Advisor to the president, former Russian Ambassador to the United States
Russia; Uzbekistan	Alisher Usmanov								Russian (-Uzbek) businessman
Russia	Vladimir Ustinov								Presidential envoy to the Southern Federal District of the Russian Federation, former Prosecutor General
Russia	Dmitry Utkin(d. 2023)								Field commander and co-founder of Wagner Group
Russia	Vladimir Vasilyev								Member of the State Duma, former Deputy Speaker of State Duma, former Head of the Republic of Dagestan
Russia	Oleh Vasin								Member of insurgent group near Slovansk
Russia	Volha Vaukova								Head of Delfini
Russia	Viktor Vekselberg								Ukrainian-born Russian businessman, owner and president of Renova Group
Russia	Yekaterina Vinokurova								Daughter of Minister of Foreign Affairs Sergey Lavrov
Russia	Aleksandr Vitko								Former Commander of the Black Sea Fleet
Russia	Vyacheslav Volodin								Chairman of the State Duma, former Deputy Chief of Staff
Russia	Viktor Vodolatsky								Member of State Duma. Ataman of Great Don Army (2000–2013), Ataman of Union of the Russian and Foreign Cossack Forces
Russia	Yury Vorobyov								Deputy Chairman of Federation Council of Russia, supports Russian troops sent to Ukraine
Russia	Maria Vorontsova								Daughter of President Vladimir Putin
Russia	Vladimir Yakunin								Russian official, former president of the state-run Russian Railways company
Ukraine	Oleksandr Yakymenko								Former Head of Security Service of Ukraine
Ukraine	Oleksandr Yanukovych								Son of former president of Ukraine Viktor Yanykovych
Ukraine	Viktor Yanukovych								4th President of Ukraine
Ukraine	Viktor Yatsenko								Minister of Communications of the unrecognized Donetsk People's Republic
Ukraine	Oleksandr Yefremov								Former Party of Regions faction leader in the Verkhovna Rada, former governor of Luhansk Oblast
Russia	Yunus-bek Yevkurov								Deputy Defence Minister, former Head of Ingushetia
Ukraine	Alexander Zakharchenko(d. 2018)								Former head of state and Prime Minister of the unrecognized Donetsk People's Republic
Ukraine	Vitaliy Zakharchenko								Former Minister of Internal Affairs of Ukraine
Russia	Alexander Zaldastanov								Leader of the Night Wolves
Ukraine	Serhii Zdriliuk								Senior aide to Igor Girkin
Russia	Sergei Zheleznyak								Member of the State Duma
Crimea	Yuriy Zherebtsov								Counsellor of the Speaker of the Supreme Council of Crimea
Russia	Vladimir Zhirinovsky(d. 2022)								Leader of the Liberal Democratic Party of Russia
Russia	Matvey Yozhikov								Russian businessman
Russia	Svetlana Zhurova								Member of the State Duma, First Deputy Chairman of the Committee for Foreign Affairs in the Duma
Crimea	Petro Zyma								Employee of the Federal Security Service; former Chief of the Security Service of Ukraine in Sevastopol

==== Organizational sanctions ====
Representative	Name	(United States)	(European Union) (United Kingdom) (Norway)	(Albania) (Iceland) (Liechtenstein) (Montenegro)	(Canada)	(Switzerland)	(Australia)	(Japan)	Remarks
Russia	Bank Rossiya								Bank that provided "material support" to Russian officials and whose biggest shareholder is the also-sanctioned Yury Kovalchuk.
Russia	Russian Agricultural Bank aka Rosselkhozbank								State-owned agricultural bank that provided "material support" to Russian officials.
Russia	Sberbank and its subsidiaries								State owned bank that provided "material support" to Russian officials
Russia	Sobinbank								Subsidiary of Bank Rossiya
Russia	Gazprombank								State-owned Russian bank
Russia	Vnesheconombank								State-owned Russian bank
Russia	VTB Group and its subsidiaries								State owned bank that provided "material support" to Russian officials
Russia	InvestCapitalBank								Bank associated with the Rotenbergs
Russia	SMP Bank								Bank associated with the Rotenbergs
Ukraine	ExpoBank								Bank
Russia	RosEnergoBank								Bank
Russia	Russian National Commercial Bank								Bank with largest network in Crimea
Russia	CJSC ABR Management								Manages Bank Rossiya group assets
Russia	Abros								Subsidiary of Bank Rossiya
Russia	Zest								Subsidiary of Bank Rossiya
Russia	Volga Group								Investment firm belonging to Gennady Timchenko
Ukraine	Profaktor TOV								Accounting, auditing, bookeeping firm associated with Petr Savchenko
Russia	NPO Mashinostroyeniya								Rocketry design bureau of Tactical Missiles Corporation within Federal Agency for State Property Management: Almaz; spacecraft; space satellites; surface, underwater, and ground platform-based launched cruise missiles and intercontinental ballistic missiles (ICBM)
Russia	High Precision Systems, OAO Wysokototschnye Kompleksi								Joint stock company selling anti-aircraft and anti-tank armaments, part of ROSTEC
Russia	Almaz-Antey Concern								Group of companies selling defense weapons
Russia	Kalashnikov Concern								Group of companies selling defense weapons
Russia	JSC Chemcomposite								State corporation selling armaments
Russia	JSC Tula Arms Plant								State corporation selling armaments
Russia	JSC Sirius								State corporation selling armaments
Russia	OJSC Stankoinstrument								State corporation selling armaments
Russia	Rosoboronexport								Sole state intermediary agency for Russia's exports/imports of defense-related and dual use products, technologies and services
Russia	Rostec								State corporation which is a group of companies and holding companies selling aircraft, electronics, and armaments
Russia	PJSC United Aircraft Corporation (UAC)								State corporation which manufactures, designs and sells military, civilian, transport, and unmanned aircraft
Russia	Bazalt								Through Techmash, a Rostec company: weapons manufacturing company that designs, develops, and manufactures bombs, glide bombs, precision-guided munitions, and rocket-propelled grenade launchers (RPG)
Russia	Concern Radio-Electronic Technologies (KRET) or (CRET)								A holding company of Rostec: develops and manufactures military spec radio-electronic, state identification, aviation and radio-electronic equipment, multi-purpose measuring devices, detachable electrical connectors and a variety of civil products. Developed one of the two existing state radiolocation identification systems
Russia	Concern Sozvezdie								Through United Instrument Manufacturing Corporation (UIMC), a Rostec company: develops and manufactures electronic warfare, radio communications, electronic countermeasures systems and equipment
Russia	KBP Instrument Design Bureau								Through High Precision Systems, a Rostec company: designs high-precision weapon systems
Russia	Uralvagonzavod								Holding company in Rostec: designs and manufactures railway cars, tractors, bulldozers, Heavy equipment, T-14 Armata & T-90 main battle tanks, and other military weapon systems
Russia	Oboronprom								Holding company in Rostec: parent company of Russian Helicopters, leading Russian designer and manufacturer for helicopters and helicopter engines, their air-defense systems, and complex radio-electronic systems.
Russia	Rostelecom								Russia's largest telecommunications company. Financial transactions are heavily restricted by U.S. Treasury
Russia	RusHydro								Russian hydroelectric company, one of Russia's largest energy producers. Financial transactions are heavily restricted by U.S. Treasury
Russia	Alrosa								The world's largest diamond mining company, responsible for 90% of Russia's diamond mining capacity (which is 28% of the global total). Financial transactions are heavily restricted by U.S. Treasury
Russia	Sovcomflot								Russia's largest maritime and freight shipping company.
Russia	VO Technopromexport (VO TPE), both OOO and OAO								Company supplying support for independent electrical power supply in Crimea
Russia	Interautomatika								Company supplying support for independent electrical power supply in Crimea
Crimea	Chornomornaftogaz								Crimea-based gas company, allegedly sanctioned in order to prevent Russian state company Gazprom from dealing with or acquiring it. After appropriation by Gazprom, also sanctioned by the EU.
Russia	Stroygazmontazh								Gas-related company tied to the Rotenbergs
Russia	Mostotrest								Construction company
Russia	Rosneft								Energy company
Russia	Gazprom Neft								Energy company
Russia	Transneft								Energy company
Russia	Novatek								Russian natural gas producer controlled by Gennady Timchenko
Russia	Stroytransgaz								Energy company associated with Volga Group and Gennady Timchenko
Russia	Stroytransgaz-M								Energy company associated with Volga Group and Gennady Timchenko
Russia	Sakhatrans								Transportation company associated with Volga Group and Gennady Timchenko
Russia	Transoil								Largest privately owned Russian railway carrier of oil and oil products associated with Volga Group and Gennady Timchenko
Russia	224th Flight Unit State Airlines								
Russia	Vladimirovka Advanced Weapons and Research Complex								
Russia	VK								VKontakte and its subsidiary created MAX, a state messaging app pre-installed on every smartphone sold in Russia.
Russia	Ashuluk Firing Range								
Panama	Lerma Trading								Firm associated with Gennady Timchenko
Cyprus; British Virgin Islands; Switzerland	LTS Holdings								Formerly known as International Petroleum Products (IPP), a firm associated with Gennady Timchenko
Russia	Transservice LLC								Subsidiary of Transoil, associated with Gennady Timchenko
Luxembourg	Maples SA								Firm through which the Transservice and Transoil railway companies are associated with Gennady Timchenko
British Virgin Islands	Fentex Properties								Firm associated with Gennady Timchenko that controls his stake in Gunvor
Cyprus	White Seal Holdings								Firm associated with Gennady Timchenko through which he owns a large stake in Novatek
Russia	Aquanika								Company selling water associated with Volga Group and Gennady Timchenko
Crimea	Feodosia								Enterprise of oil supping
Crimea	State ferry enterprise 'Kerch ferry'								Enterprise transferred contrary to the Ukrainian law
Crimea	State enterprise 'Sevastopol commercial seaport'								Enterprise transferred contrary to the Ukrainian law
Crimea	State enterprise 'Kerch commercial sea port'								Enterprise transferred contrary to the Ukrainian law
Crimea	Resort 'Nizhnyaya Oreanda'								Enterprise transferred contrary to the Ukrainian law
Crimea	Crimean enterprise 'Azov distillery plant'								Enterprise transferred contrary to the Ukrainian law
Crimea	State concern 'National Association of producers "Massandra"'								Enterprise transferred contrary to the Ukrainian law
Crimea	State enterprise 'National Institute of Vine and Wine "Magarach"'								Enterprise transferred contrary to the Ukrainian law
Crimea	State enterprise 'Factory of sparkling wine Novy Svet'								Enterprise transferred contrary to the Ukrainian law
Crimea	Yalta Film Studio								Film production studio in Crimea that supports Russian interests
Russia	VAD, AO								Russia-based company constructing the Tavrida Highway (federal Р260) in Crimea which will be the primary connection among the Crimean Bridge, Simferopol, and Sevastopol
Russia	Dobrolet								Russian low-cost airline, exclusive operator of flights between Moscow and Simferopol
Crimea	Universal-Avia								Illegal ownership transfer of state-owned air transportation company
Russia	Avia Group Terminal LLC								Subsidiary of Sheremetyevo International Airport associated with Volga Group and Gennady Timchenko
Russia	Avia Group Nord								Subsidiary of Pulkovo International Airport associated with Volga Group and Gennady Timchenko
Russia	Army of the South-East (Russian: Армия Юго-Востока)								Illegal armed separatist group
Russia	Donbass People's Militia								Illegal armed separatist group
Russia	Great Don Army								Illegal armed separatist group that establish the Cossack National Guard
Russia	Cossack National Guard								Illegal armed separatist group
Russia	People's Militia of Luhansk People's Republic								Illegal armed separatist group
Russia	Luhansk Guard								Illegal armed separatist group
Russia	Vostok Battalion								Illegal armed separatist group
Russia	SOBOL								Illegal armed separatist group
Russia	Southeast Movement								Illegal armed separatist group
Russia	Oplot Battalion								Illegal armed separatist group
Russia	Kalmius Battalion								Illegal armed separatist group
Russia	Smert (death) Battalion								Illegal armed separatist group
Russia	Prizrak Brigade								Illegal armed separatist group
Russia	Somalia Battalion								Illegal armed separatist group
Russia	Sparta Battalion								Illegal armed separatist group
Russia	Zarya Battalion								Illegal armed separatist group
Russia	Night Wolves								Illegal armed separatist group
Russia	Free Donbass								Political party in Donetsk People's Republic
Russia	Donetsk Republic								Political party in Donetsk People's Republic
Russia	Peace to Luhansk region								Political party in Luhansk People's Republic
Russia	People's Union								Political party in Luhansk People's Republic
Russia	Luhansk Economic Union								Political party in Luhansk People's Republic
Russia	Novorossiya Party								Political party in Federal State of Novorossiya
Russia	Federal State of Novorossiya								Unrecognized entity
Russia	Donetsk People's Republic								Unrecognized entity
Russia	Luhansk People's Republic								Unrecognized entity

Further sanctions by the US have been made in February 2024, presumably in response to the death of Alexei Navalny in a Work Camp prison, and to mark the upcoming second anniversary of the invasion of Ukraine by Russia.

=== Removal from sanctions list ===
In early-March 2014, the European Union froze all funds belonging to Raisa Bohatyriova on suspicion of her illegal use of budget funds. It was reported in 2016 that, according to the Ukrainian government, she had since repaid government funds that had been allegedly misappropriated. For this, her funds in the EU were unfrozen on 6 March 2016.

=== Frozen accounts and property ===
Country	Private property	Date	Source
Switzerland	8.79 billion euro	14 May 2022	
Czech Republic	hundreds of millions in Czech koruna	27 March 2022	
Cayman Islands	7.3 billion dollars	8 April 2022	
Jersey	7 billion dollars	13 April 2022	
Netherlands	500-600 million dollars	13 April 2022	
United Kingdom	10 billion pounds	14 April 2022	
Ukraine	26 billion hryvnia	18 April 2022	
European Union, total	35 billion euro	22 April 2022	
France	23.5 billion euro	22 April 2022	
Belgium	10 billion euro	22 April 2022	
Italy	1.1 billion euro	22 April 2022	
Ireland	839.4 million euro	22 April 2022	
Poland	34.5 million euro	22 April 2022	
Sweden	28.8 million euro	22 April 2022	
Finland	225 thousand euro	28 April 2022	

=== 22 March 2022 statistics ===
Country	Russian and Ukrainian people and organisations sanctioned
World	7116
United States	1244
United Kingdom	1037
Switzerland	1033
Canada	980
European Union	953
France	944
Australia	699
Japan	229

== By Russia ==
=== Prior to 2022 ===
In May 2014, Russia sanctioned more individuals from the United States and Canada, but the list has not yet been revealed.

After a member of the German Bundestag was denied entry into Russia in May 2015, Russia released a blacklist to the European Union governments of 89 politicians and officials from the EU who are not allowed entry into Russia under the present sanctions regime. Russia asked for the blacklist to not be made public

. The list is said to include eight Swedes, as well as two Member of Parliament (MPs) and two Member of the European Parliament (MEPs) from the Netherlands. Finland's national broadcaster Yle published a leaked German version of the list.

In January and March 2015, three politicians from Lithuania, Latvia, and Poland were blocked from entering Russia due to alleged "anti-Russian activities."

On October 22, 2018, Russian president Vladimir Putin signed a decree on special economic measures in relation to Ukraine's unfriendly actions against Russian individuals and entities. On August 21, 2021, Russia expanded its economic sanctions on Ukrainian individuals and included Foreign Minister Dmytro Kuleba and National Security and Defense Council Secretary Oleksiy Danilov. The updated version of the list of sanctioned individuals, approved by Russian prime minister Mikhail Mishustin, was published on the government website containing legal information. The sanctions include freezing non-cash accounts and other assets in Russia and a ban on capital transfers from Russia. The number of sanctioned Ukrainian individuals rose from 849 to 922.

Removal from sanction list

Russia has lifted targeted sanctions to allow US Under Secretary of State for Political Affairs Victoria Nuland to visit Moscow for meetings with Russian officials on October 12, 2021.

Maria Zakharova, spokeswoman for Russia's Foreign Ministry, said Nuland was in the sanctions list that prohibits individuals from entering the country, but it has been removed after the US nixed a similar restriction, barring a Russian citizen from entering the country.

"Indeed, she was on a sanction list. It means that such a person cannot cross the border. They put Russian representatives on their sanction lists, hence, in this case the matter was settled on the parity basis," said Zakharova in an interview on the Rossiya 1 television channel.

Zakharova confirmed that the US had removed some Russian representatives from their sanction lists, and said Nuland's visit to Russia was requested by the US."I think our Western partners should analyze this approach and understand that we can respond in a negative manner to negative things. We can also respond in a positive manner to positive things and have always been opting for the latter," she said. Zakharova later clarified to Govorit Moskva radio that one Russian citizen had been removed from the US sanctions list, but she did not disclose the person's name.

=== Post 24 February 2022 ===
==== Against US ====
On March 15, 2022, the Ministry of Foreign Affairs of the Russian Federation (MFARF) said it had imposed sanctions on U.S. President Joe Biden and 12 other US officials. The MFARF released a statement on April 13, 2022, announcing sanctions against 398 members of the U.S. House of Representatives.

On May 21, 2022, the MFARF published on its website list US citizens who are banned from entering Russia on a permanent basis. The "stop list" included 963 people. Russia has imposed personal sanctions on 61 US officials including Treasury Secretary Janet Yellen and Energy Secretary Jennifer Granholm and leading defence and media executives, the Russian foreign ministry said on June 6, 2022. U.S. President Joe Biden's wife and daughter have been banned from Russia, along with 23 other Americans, the MFARF said on June 28, 2022.

On September 5, 2022, the Russian Foreign Ministry prohibited 25 high-ranking officials, business people, and actors from entering Russia "on a permanent basis." The move comes in retaliation for U.S. president Joe Biden's sanctions against Moscow, the press release added. The Russian Foreign Ministry has sanctioned 200 US nationals in retaliation for American sanctions on November 11, 2022. Notable persons include the immediate family of U.S. President Biden, officials and their immediate family, and lawmakers. With these additions, the Russian Foreign Ministry has now sanctioned 1,073 Americans.

Russia has imposed personal sanctions on 77 US politicians and officials, the Russian foreign ministry released on February 8, 2023. On February 16, 2023, the Migration Service of the Moscow Police slapped a 40-year entry ban to Russia on American citizen Alicia Day, who was detained two weeks earlier after walking a calf along Moscow's Red Square.

On May 17, 2023, additional 500 American citizens, including former U.S. President Barack Obama, have been indefinitely barred from entering Russia, the Russian Foreign Ministry announced. Among the newly blacklisted are significant figures, officials, lawmakers, experts and heads of military-industrial companies, the Russian Foreign Ministry said in a statement. Moscow said the travel ban was introduced in response to repeatedly imposed anti-Russian sanctions by the Joe Biden administration."It is high time for Washington to learn that not a single hostile attack against Russia will be left without a strong reaction," the Russian Foreign Ministry said.

On March 15, 2024, Russia has banned entry to another 227 Americans involved in fostering and implementing the Russophobic policy of the current US administration, the Russian Foreign Ministry announced.

==== Against Canada ====
A total of 313 Canadian officials and MPs including Prime Minister Justin Trudeau were blacklisted by Russia on March 15. On April 13, Russia sanctioned 87 Canadian senators.

On April 28, the Russian Foreign Ministry published a list of 592 Canadian citizens that are permanently barred from entering the country. Moscow is set to bar entry permissions for 26 nationals of Canada in response to the country's earlier announced measures, the MFARF said on May 21, 2022.

Russia on June 3, 2022, announced a travel ban on 41 Canadian citizens, including several members of the Ukrainian Canadian Congress, in retaliation for "anti-Russian" sanctions imposed on Moscow over Ukraine. Russia sanctioned 43 Canadian citizens on June 27, 2022, barring them from entering the country in a tit-for-tat response to Western sanctions on Moscow. Moscow barred entry to 62 Canadian citizens in response to another expansion of anti-Russian sanctions by Ottawa, the Russian Foreign Ministry said in its statement on August 5, 2022.

Moscow barred entry to 55 Canadian and American citizens in response to another expansion of anti-Russian sanctions by Ottawa, the Russian Foreign Ministry said in its statement on August 31, 2022.

The Russian Foreign Ministry announced on September 22, 2022, that an additional 87 Canadian citizens have been indefinitely barred from entering the country in response to Ottawa's anti-Russian sanctions. The newly blacklisted are Canada's regional leaders, senior military officers, heads of companies supplying Ukraine with weapons and dual-use technologies. A total of 905 Canadians have been under Moscow's sanctions, including a travel ban, official data show. Russia's Foreign Ministry announced on November 14, 2022, that 100 Canadians have been added to the list of people banned from entering the country in response to sanctions against Russia by Canada. In response to Ottawa's sanctions, Russia has blacklisted 200 Canadians, banning them from entering the country, the Russian Foreign Ministry said in a statement on December 9, 2022.

In total, the list of Canadian citizens who are permanently barred entry to the Russian Federation includes 1,204 names.

On April 12, 2023, Russia imposed sanctions on 333 Canadian officials and public figures, including prominent Olympians, in what it said was a tit-for-tat response to Canadian restrictions on Moscow and support for Ukraine.

On March 22, 2024, Russia imposed sanctions on 56 Canadian officials and public figures, in what it said was "in response to sanctions continuously introduced by the liberal government of Justin Trudeau against Russian senior officials, representatives of the business community, academic circles and the civil society, and all those out of favor with official Ottawa patronizing the pro-Nazi regime in Kiev".

==== Against Australia and New Zealand ====
On April 7, 2022, the Russian Foreign Ministry announced sanctions on 228 members of the Australian government and 130 members of the New Zealand government, including their prime ministers and other high-ranking members of Cabinet. On June 16, 2022, the MFARF said that it was sanctioning an additional 121 Australian citizens, including journalists and defense officials, citing what it calls a "Russophobic agenda" in the country.

Russia has added 39 representatives of Australian security services and defense companies to a "stop-list" that bars them from entering the country, in response to a sanctions law adopted by Canberra, the Russian foreign ministry said on July 21, 2022.

Russia imposed sanctions on 32 citizens of New Zealand, including representatives of the command of the country's armed forces and journalists, the Russian Foreign Ministry said on July 30, 2022. And on September 16, 2022, Russia has sanctioned another 41 Australian nationals from entering the country.

The Russian Foreign Ministry announced on January 19, 2023, that 31 officials, journalists and public figures from New Zealand have been indefinitely barred from entering Russia.

The Russian Foreign Ministry announced on June 21, 2023, that 48 officials, journalists and defense industry contractors from Australia have been indefinitely barred from entering Russia.

The Russian Foreign Ministry announced on April 17, 2024, that 235 officials, journalists and defense industry contractors from Australia have been indefinitely barred from entering Russia.

==== Against UK ====
The MFARF released a statement on April 16, 2022, announcing sanctions against UK prime minister Boris Johnson and 12 other UK Officials. The MFARF released a statement on April 27, 2022, announcing sanctions against 287 British MPs. On May 24, 2022, Russia imposed sanctions against 154 members of the House of Lords of the British Parliament in response to London's decision to include almost the entire composition of the Russian Federation Council in the sanctions list.

On June 14, 2022, Russia has imposed sanctions on 49 UK citizens, including journalists, defense officials and arms industry executives, in response to western punitive measures against Moscow over the Russian invasion of Ukraine. Russia has expanded its sanctions stop-list for British nationals, putting on it 39 politicians, business people, and journalists, including the country's former prime minister David Cameron, the Russian Foreign Ministry said on August 1, 2022. On September 14, 2022, the Russian Foreign Ministry sanctioned 30 British citizens. In a statement, it said the British nationals included UK defense lobby representatives and were encouraging anti-Russian agenda.

Moscow has expanded its sanctions stop-list for British nationals, blackballing 36 politicians, security officials, and journalists from the UK, the Russian Foreign Ministry said in a statement on January 12, 2023. The Russian Foreign Ministry on March 17, 2023, announced sanctions on 23 more British citizens in a retaliatory move. In a statement on its website, the ministry said officers of the British armed forces involved in the training of Ukrainian military against the Russian army, including commanders of formations that provided instructors for this purpose, have been put on Russia's stop list.

Top officials of the Zinc Network Corporation were also put on the list of British citizens who are now barred from entering Russia, it said. "In addition, restrictions have been imposed on a number of judges and officials of the UK penitentiary system involved in the harassment of independent journalists. "In particular, representatives of the management of the maximum security prison Bermarsh in London, which is known for repeated cases of human rights violations were included in the 'stop list'," the ministry said.

Russia has imposed personal sanctions against 54 British citizens, including officials, journalists and law enforcement representatives, the Russian Foreign Ministry said on August 18, 2023.The decision was taken "in response to London's hostile anti-Russian course," and unilateral sanctions imposed against Russian citizens and economic operators, the ministry said in a statement.

Russia has imposed personal sanctions against 18 British citizens, including officials, scholars and law enforcement representatives, the Russian Foreign Ministry said on February 12, 2024.

Russia has imposed personal sanctions against 22 British citizens, including officials, members of IT sector and legal market, the Foreign Ministry said on April 10, 2024.

==== Against European countries ====
Russia imposed an entry ban for 9 Icelandics, 16 Norwegians, 3 Greenlanders and 3 Faroe Islanders in retaliation for their joining the European Union sanctions, the MFARF said in a statement released on April 29, 2022. Russia banned entry to Minister of Foreign Affairs and Defence and former director of National Security Agency of Montenegro on October 14, 2022. Russia imposed sanctions against 52 key Irish officials and politicians, the Russian Foreign Ministry said in a statement on November 16, 2022.

The Russian Foreign Ministry announced on March 9, 2023, that 144 citizens of Latvia, Lithuania and Estonia have been barred from entering Russia. The newly blacklisted are ministers, parliament members, public figures and journalists of the three countries, the ministry said in a statement, without disclosing their names. Russia imposed the travel ban in response to "the active lobbying by the Baltic states of sanctions and other measures against Russia, interference in its internal affairs, and inciting Russophobic sentiments," the statement said.

The Russian Foreign Ministry announced on January 19, 2024, imposed an entry ban on a number of Cypriot officials in retaliation for actions against a Rossiyskaya Gazeta correspondent and a Russian embassy staffer, the Russian Foreign Ministry has said in a news release.

The Russian Foreign Ministry announced on March 12, 2024, that 347 citizens of Latvia, Lithuania and Estonia have been barred from entering Russia. The newly blacklisted are ministers, parliament members, public figures and journalists of the three countries, the ministry said in a statement. The Russian Foreign Ministry blamed the governments of the three Baltic states of interfering in its domestic affairs and “persecuting” their Russian-speaking populations in the announcement published on its website. It also said that the Baltic countries were waging “a barbaric campaign of mass demolition of monuments to Soviet soldiers-liberators, rewriting history, glorifying Nazism,” as well as “pumping up the Kyiv regime with weapons.”“These atrocities demand retaliatory measures against those involved,” the Foreign Ministry's statement continued.

==== Against Japan ====
On May 4, 2022, Russia sanctioned 63 Japanese citizens. They include Prime Minister Fumio Kishida, Foreign Minister Yoshimasa Hayashi and other senior lawmakers. Russia on July 15, 2022, imposed sanctions against 384 members of Japan's parliament. Russia said the measures were taken against those who had "taken an unfriendly, anti-Russian position."

==== Against Ukraine and Moldova ====
Several Kremlin-linked media outlets reported that 31 Ukrainian celebrities, TV presenters, and influencers are now banned from entering Russia for 50 years. The list includes singers Dmytro Monatik, Jamala, Svyatoslav Vakarchuk who is the lead singer of the rock band Okean Elzy, and more. All of them called out Russia for its war against Ukraine.

Russia has banned Interior Minister Ana Revenco and three deputies of the Action and Solidarity Party, PAS, Oazu Nantoi, Olesea Stamate and Lilian Carp on April 24, 2023.

==== Organizational sanctions ====
In March 2015, the Russian Federal Service for Surveillance on Consumer Rights Protection and Human Well-being (Rospotrebnadzor) banned supplies of certain household chemicals made in Ukraine. In October 2015, Russia also put a ban on flights between Russia and Ukraine.

From 1 January 2016, Russia suspended the application of the Free Trade Agreement of the Commonwealth of Independent States ("CIS FTA") with respect to Ukraine because Ukraine entered into the Association Agreement with the EU providing Ukraine with access to the European single market in certain sectors. The CIS FTA partially entered into force on 1 January 2016 and became entirely effective on 1 September 2017. According to the CIS FTA, Ukraine cannot simultaneously participate in free trade zones with the EU and the CIS countries.

As a result of the suspension of the CIS FTA, the importation of goods originating from Ukraine to Russia has become subject to regular customs duties as specified in the Common Customs Tariff of the Eurasian Economic Union (EAEU). Russia also imposed a ban on the transit of certain goods (i.e., goods subject to customs duties other than 0% and the embargoed goods) by road and rail from Ukraine through Russia to Kazakhstan and Kyrgyzstan. The transit of non-restricted goods (by road and rail) from Ukraine through Russia to Kazakhstan and Kyrgyzstan should be carried out only through the territory of Belarus, provided that such goods have identification and tracking means, including those that are operating on the basis of the Global Navigation Satellite System (GLONASS). The drivers of the vehicles, who are involved in road shipments, must have registration vouchers.

At the same time, the CIS FTA remains effective with regard to the exportation of natural gas in a gaseous state from Russia to Ukraine.

In May 2017, in response to Kyiv's ban on the operation of Russia's payment systems, Russia enacted a law restricting money transfers from Russia if a country restricts the operation of Russian payment systems in its territory. As a result, money transfers from Russia to Ukraine can only be performed via Russian systems. The new restrictions apply only to financial transfers conducted without opening a bank account.

In May 2017, Russia requested World Trade Organization (WTO) dispute consultations with Ukraine regarding the restrictions, prohibitions, requirements and procedures adopted and maintained by Ukraine in respect of trade in goods and services from Russia (Case No. DS525).

On 22 October 2018, the Russian president signed a decree calling for counter-sanctions against Ukraine and instructing the Russian government to draw up a list of companies and individuals that would be subject to economic restrictions under the new measures, and a list of the respective restrictions. On 29 December 2018, the Russian prime minister signed Resolution No. 1716-83 extending the import ban of Ukrainian goods (including agricultural products, raw materials, food products, industrial goods and certain personal hygiene products). Resolution No. 1716-83 introduced an import ban with respect to listed goods: (i) originating from Ukraine; (ii) that are supplied from Ukraine; or (iii) that were in transit through the territory of Ukraine. The import ban does not apply to listed goods that are transferred through Russia to third countries (subject to certain conditions).

On 18 April 2019, the Russian government enacted Governmental Resolution No. 460-25, which introduced two more lists to Resolution No. 1716-83, namely: (i) a list of oil, oil products and other goods that could not be exported from Russia to Ukraine; and (ii) a list of certain fuel and energy products that, from 1 June 2019, could not be exported from Russia to Ukraine without the permission of the Russian Ministry of Economic Development.

During 2019, the Russian government amended the lists of goods subject to the import and/or export ban several times by adding new goods to these lists and lifting the import and/or export ban on certain listed goods. The Russian government also set specific dates for the entry into force of the import ban with respect to certain listed products. Russian prime minister Mikhail Mishustin signed a decree expanding the list of Ukrainian companies that have economic sanctions imposed on them in connection with unfriendly actions of Ukraine. The document was published on the official portal of legal information on Friday.

The document introduces amendments to Appendix No. 2 to the Decree of the Government of the Russian Federation of November 1, 2018 No. 1300 on Measures to implement the decree of the president of the Russian Federation No. 592 of October 22, 2018.

In the original version of the document, the list of legal entities subject to special economic measures consisted of 68 companies. Later it was expanded to 75 entities.

Now the list comprises 84 companies that have economic sanctions on them. The new list includes nine more companies, in particular – Donmar LLC, Kranship LLC, Transship LLC and Poltava Auto Unit Plant PJSC.

The Russian government has approved a list of legal entities, which are subject to retaliatory sanctions. The relevant resolution of the Cabinet of Ministers was published on the official portal of legal information on May 11, 2022.

The list includes 31 companies from Germany, France and other European countries, as well as from the US and Singapore. In particular, it includes former European subsidiaries of Gazprom, traders and operators of underground gas storage facilities.

In particular, Russian authorities, legal entities and citizens will not be able to conclude transactions with the sanctioned entities and organizations under their control, fulfill obligations to them under completed transactions, and conduct financial transactions in their favor. This includes the concluded foreign trade contracts. These bans were earlier established by a decree of Putin.

The resolution sets additional criteria for transactions that are prohibited from being performed with companies in the sanctions list. These are transactions concluded in favor of the sanctioned persons, or providing for the making of payments, transactions with securities with the participation or in favor of such companies, or transactions involving the entry of ships owned or chartered by sanctioned persons, in their interest or on their behalf, into the Russian ports.

The resolution appoints the Russian Finance Ministry responsible for sending proposals to the Cabinet of Ministers on making changes to the list, as well as on granting temporary permits for certain transactions with persons under sanctions. The document comes into force from the date of its official publication.

Russia's sanctions list includes Gazprom Germania GmbH, Gazprom Schweiz AG, Gazprom Marketing & Trading USA Inc, Vemex, Wingas, EuRoPol GAZ.

On October 11, Russia's financial monitoring agency, Rosfinmonitoring, has added US tech giant Meta Platforms Inc, the parent company of Instagram and Facebook, to its list of "terrorists and extremists".

On October 26, Russia banned dealings in the shares or share capital of 45 banks or banking units, all either owned by parties in countries that Russia terms "unfriendly" or owned through foreign capital. The list followed a decree issued on August 5 by President Vladimir Putin banning dealings in stakes in the financial and energy sectors owned by parties in "unfriendly" countries unless specific permission was given. The list included Russian units of Intesa Sanpaolo, Credit Suisse, Raiffeisen, Citi, OTP Bank, Western Union DP Vostok and UniCredit. Subsidiaries of Deutsche Bank, the French group BNP Paribas, Goldman Sachs, UBS, HSBC, JPMorgan, PayPal service, American Express payment system and others as well as the Russian Yandex-Bank and Ozon-Bank were present.

The list also includes many players specializing in car loans – subsidiaries of foreign automakers: MS Bank Rus (Mitsubishi); RN-Bank (owned by UniCredit and Renault-Nissan-Mitsubishi); Toyota Bank (indirectly controlled by Toyota); Mercedes-Benz Bank Rus (Mercedes-Benz Group); BMW Bank (indirectly controlled by BMW).

Russia's government has approved a list of legal entities subject to special economic measures in the area of military-technical cooperation. A corresponding decree has been signed, the cabinet's press service said in a statement on November 8, 2022.

"The list contains 74 entities from Bulgaria, the UK, Germany, Canada, Lithuania, Slovakia, Poland, the Czech Republic, Montenegro, Estonia and the US. Deals with the companies on the list in the area of military-technical cooperation are banned," the statement said.

The decree has been prepared pursuant to an order by Russian President Vladimir Putin ‘On use of retaliatory special economic measures due to hostile actions of certain foreign states and international organizations’.

=== List ===
Country	Name	Position
Australia	Scott Morrison	Former prime minister
Australia	Marise Payne	Former foreign minister
Australia	Barnaby Joyce	Former deputy prime minister
Australia	Rex Patrick	Former Senator for South Australia
Australia	Angus Campbell	Chief of the Defence Force
Australia	Monica Attard	Professor and Head of Journalism at University of Technology Sydney
Australia	Mel Hupfeld	Chief of the Royal Australian Air Force
Australia	Michael Noonan	Chief of the Royal Australian Navy
Australia	Toby Walsh	AI researcher
Australia	Christopher Dore	Former editor-in-chief of The Australian
Australia	Kerry Stokes	Seven West Media chairman
Australia	Mark Davies	Chief engineer of Rio Tinto
Australia	Simon Trott	CEO of Rio Tinto
Australia	Scott Farquhar	Co-founder and co-CEO of Atlassian
Australia	Jamie Chalker	Northern Territory police commissioner
Australia	Peter Welling	CEO of Serco
Australia	Ben Bayot	Director of Australian Turf Club
Australia	Michael Outram	Commissioner of the Australian Border Force
Australia	David Brown	Chief executive of the Department for Correctional Services, South Australia
Australia	Joe Buffone	Director-general of Emergency Management Australia
Australia	Emma Cassar	Commissioner of Corrections Victoria
Australia	Kevin Corcoran	Commissioner of Corrective Services NSW
Australia	Annika Burgess	Correspondent and producer of the Asia-Pacific news department of the ABC
Australia	Jason Dasey	Producer of the digital block of the Asia-Pacific news department of ABC
Australia	Greg Bilton	Chief of Joint Operations, former Deputy Commanding General – Operations of United States Army Pacific
Australia	Rick Burr	Former Chief of Army, former Deputy Commanding General – Operations of United States Army Pacific
Australia	Geoff Lee	Minister for Corrections
Australia	Mike Pezzullo	Secretary of the Department of Home Affairs
Australia	Natalie Hutchins	Minister for Education in Victoria
Australia	Karen Webb	Commissioner of the New South Wales Police Force
Australia	Katarina Carroll	Commissioner of the Queensland Police Service
Australia	Marc Ablong	Deputy home affairs secretary
Australia	Mike Cannon-Brookes	Co-chairman of Atlassian
Australia	Anthony De Ceglie	Editor-in-chief of The West Australian
Australia	Michael Miller	Chairman of News Corp Australia
Australia	Ben Saul	Challis Professor of International Law at the University of Sydney and an Australian Research Council Future Fellow
Australia	Jonathan Mead	Vice admiral, head of the special working group on nuclear submarines within the AUKUS in the Ministry of Defense
Australia	Brian Schmidt	Vice-Chancellor of the Australian National University
Australia	Mike Sneesby	Chairman of Nine Entertainment
Australia	Hedley Boyd-Moss	Vice-president, Head of Development at Dronshield
Australia	Angus Bean	Chief Technical Officer of Dronshield
Australia	John Best	Chief technical director of Thales Australia
Australia	Juliette McIntyre	Lecturer at the University of South Australia
Australia	Donald Rothwell	Professor at the College of Law, Australian National University
Australia	Joseph Siracusa	Professor of Political History and International Diplomacy at Curtin University
Australia	Belinda Hutchinson	Head of the board of directors of Thales Australia, Chancellor of the University of Sydney
Australia	Ben Hudson	CEO of BAE Systems Australia
Australia	Luise Elsing	Member of Municipality of Woollahra council
Australia	Nick Dole	Correspondent of ABC
Australia	David Wu	Sky News Australia journalist
Australia	Crystal Wu	Sky News Australia journalist
Australia	Lachlan Murdoch	Chairman of Nova Entertainment
Australia	Prudence Murdoch	Independent company director of News Corporation
Australia	Harry Triguboff	Managing director of Meriton
Australia	Jarrod Villani	Chief Operating Officer and Commercial Director, Executive Vice President of Paramount Australia & New Zealand
Australia	Peter Jennings	Executive director Australian Strategic Policy Institute
Australia	Dominique Frazer	Research Fellow, Australian Strategic Policy Institute
Australia	Andrew Kefford	Deputy Secretary Social Cohesion and Citizenship in the Department of Home Affairs
Australia	Malcolm Skene	Group Manager, Industry and Border Systems, Australian Border Force
Australia	Michael Strickland	Managing director, Justice & Immigration at Serco
Australia	Mark Ryan	Queensland's Minister for Police and Corrective Services
Australia	Selena Uibo	Attorney-General and Minister for Justice for the Northern Territory
Australia	Matthew Varley	Northern Territory Correctional Services Commissioner
Australia	Vincent Tarzia	Former Minister for Police, Emergency Services and Correctional Services for South Australia
Australia	Grant Stevens	Commissioner of the South Australian Police
Australia	Chad Barton	Chief Operating Officer and Chief Financial Officer at Nuix
Australia	Amanda Holt	Chief Executive Officer at SYPAQ Systems
Australia	George Vicino	Founder and Owner of SYPAQ Systems
Australia	Alex Cresswell	Chief Executive Officer and Chairman of Thales UK
Australia	Cheryl Pearce	Deputy Commissioner in the Australian Border Force
Australia	Cheryl-Anne Moy	Deputy Secretary, Immigration and Settlement Services
Australia	Justin Bassi	Executive director of Australian Strategic Policy Institute
Australia	Malcolm Davis	Senior Analyst of Australian Strategic Policy Institute
Australia	Anastasia Kapetas	National Security Editor, The Strategist, Australian Strategic Policy Institute
Australia	Michael Shoebridge	Research program director of Defense, Strategy and National Security, Australian Strategic Policy Institute
Australia	Peter Layton	Research Fellow, Asia Institute, Griffith University
Australia	Johnathan Lea	Senior reporter for Sky News Australia, specializing in political topics
Australia	Amanda Hodge	Correspondent of the Southeast Asia Department of The Australian
Australia	Robert Murray	Chairman of Southern Cross Austereo
Australia	Stephen Pearson	Head of the information technology group of the Ministry of Defense
Australia	Robert Plath	Rear admiral, head of the special working group on countering COVID-19 in the Ministry of Defense
Australia	Peter Costello	Former Treasurer
Australia	George Savvides	Chairman of Special Broadcasting Service
Australia	Tanya Monro	Chief Defence Scientist
Australia	Peter Malinauskas	Premier of South Australia
Australia	Andrew Bolt	Right-wing social and political commentator
Australia	Stan Grant	Senior Fellow at Australian Strategic Policy Institute
Australia	Ita Buttrose	Chair of Australian Broadcasting Corporation
Australia	Liz Hayes	Reporter for 60 Minutes
Australia	Gina Rinehart	Mining magnate
Australia	Andrew Forrest	Former CEO and current non-executive chairman of Fortescue
Australia	Richard Marles	Deputy Prime Minister
Australia	Simon Birmingham	Former Finance Minister
Australia	Jim Chalmers	Federal Treasurer
Australia	Chris Bowen	Federal Minister for Climate Change and Energy
Australia	David Fawcett	Senator
Australia	Mark Dreyfus	Federal Attorney-General
Australia	Josh Frydenberg	Former Federal Treasurer
Australia	Karen Andrews	Former Minister for Home Affairs
Australia	Peter Dutton	Former Minister of Defence
Australia	Anthony Albanese	Prime minister
Australia	Julie Collins	Federal Minister for Housing and Homelessness
Australia	Catherine King	Federal Minister for Infrastructure, Transport, Regional Development & Local Government
Australia	Brendan O'Connor	Federal Minister for Skills and Training
Australia	Tanya Plibersek	Shadow Minister for Education and Minister for Women
Australia	Katy Gallagher	Federal Minister for Finance, Minister for Women
Australia	Joel Fitzgibbon	Former Member of Parliament for Hunter
Australia	Don Farrell	Federal Special Minister of State, Minister for Trade and Tourism
Australia	Kristina Keneally	Former Senator
Australia	Bill Shorten	Federal Minister for the National Disability Insurance Scheme, Minister for Government Services
Australia	Terri Butler	Former Member of Parliament for Griffith
Australia	Madeleine King	Federal Minister for Resources, Minister for Northern Australia
Australia	Ed Husic	Federal Minister for Industry and Science
Australia	Matt Thistlethwaite	Assistant Minister for the Republic
Australia	Michelle Rowland	Federal Minister for Communications
Australia	Amanda Rishworth	Federal Minister for Social Services
Australia	Jason Clare	Federal Minister for Education
Australia	Linda Burney	Federal Minister for Indigenous Australians
Australia	Eric Abetz	Former Senator
Australia	Alex Antic	Senator
Australia	James McGrath	Senator
Australia	James Paterson	Senator
Australia	Claire Chandler	Senator
Australia	George Christensen	Former Member of Parliament for Dawson. However, there are unconfirmed reports that the Russian ambassador to Australia may have rescinded the sanction as of September 20, 2022
Australia	Brian Mitchell	MP, House of Representatives
Australia	Daniel Mulino	MP, House of Representatives
Australia	David Smith	MP, House of Representatives
Australia	Tim Wilson	MP, House of Representatives
Australia	Angie Bell	MP, House of Representatives
Australia	Sharon Bird	MP, House of Representatives
Australia	Ben Morton	MP, House of Representatives
Australia	Russell Broadbent	MP, House of Representatives
Australia	Scott Buchholz	MP, House of Representatives
Australia	Anthony D. Burke	MP, House of Representatives
Australia	Warren Entsch	MP, House of Representatives
Australia	Josh Burns	MP, House of Representatives
Australia	Mark Butler	MP, House of Representatives
Australia	Trevor Evans	MP, House of Representatives
Australia	Michelle Landry	MP, House of Representatives
Australia	Anthony Byrne	MP, House of Representatives
Australia	Paul Fletcher	MP, House of Representatives
Australia	Darren Chester	MP, House of Representatives
Australia	Lisa Chesters	MP, House of Representatives
Australia	Concetta Fierravanti-Wells	Former Senator
Australia	Jim Molan	Senator
Australia	Amanda Stoker	Former Senator
Australia	Raff Ciccone	Senator
Australia	Andrew Hastie	MP, House of Representatives
Australia	Peter Khalil	MP, House of Representatives
Australia	Adam Bandt	Leader of the Australian Greens
Australia	Daniel Tehan	Former Minister for Trade, Tourism and Investment
Australia	Kim Carr	Labor MP
Australia	Kevin Andrews	Father of the Australian House of Representatives
Australia	Kimberley Kitching	Former Labor Senator
Australia	Matthew Guy	Outgoing Opposition Leader of Victoria
Australia	Steve Dimopoulos	Labor MP
Australia	Michaelia Cash	Former attorney general
Australia	Penny Wong	Minister for Foreign Affairs and Leader of the Government in the Senate
Austria	Raiffeisenbank (Russia)	Subsidiary of Raiffeisen Bank International, a fully controlled subsidiary of Austrian banking group Raiffeisen Zentralbank
Belgium	Mark Demesmaeker	Member of the European Parliament
Belgium	Guy Verhofstadt	Leader of the Alliance of Liberals and Democrats faction of the European Parliament
Bulgaria	Ilian Vassilev	Former Bulgarian Ambassador to Russia
Bulgaria	Arsenal AD	Oldest Bulgarian arms supplier
Bulgaria	VMZ Sopot	Largest armaments factory in Bulgaria
Bulgaria	Beta Corp AD	Armaments factory in Bulgaria
Bulgaria	UMT LLC	Armaments factory in Bulgaria, leading Bulgarian manufacturer of carbide cutting tools
Bulgaria	Arcus Co	Armaments factory in Bulgaria
Bulgaria	TEREM	Government owned specializing in servicing equipment and producing ammunition and spares
Bulgaria	EIM Trade Ltd.	Armaments factory in Bulgaria
Bulgaria	Balkan Hunter	Armaments factory in Bulgaria
Bulgaria	Hartford International Group	Armaments factory in Bulgaria
Bulgaria	Sage Consultations	Armaments factory in Bulgaria
Bulgaria	Balkanrous Trading	Armaments factory in Bulgaria
Bulgaria	Emco Ltd.	Armaments factory in Bulgaria
Bulgaria	EL kart	Armaments factory in Bulgaria
Bulgaria	Metalika-AB	Armaments factory in Bulgaria
Bulgaria	Dunarit AD	Armaments factory in Bulgaria
Canada	Christine Hogan	Executive director for Canada, Ireland and the Caribbean at the World Bank Group
Canada	Justin Trudeau	Prime Minister of Canada
Canada	Sophie Grégoire Trudeau	Wife of Justin Trudeau
Canada	Mary Simon	Governor general of Canada
Canada	Mike Farnworth	Deputy premier of British Columbia
Canada	Caroline Mulroney	Minister of Francophonie, Minister of Transport for Ontario
Canada	Jill Dunlop	Secretary of State for Colleges and Universities of Ontario
Canada	Doug Downey	Attorney General of Ontario
Canada	Parm Gill	Minister of Red Tape Reduction
Canada	Michael Ford	Ontario Minister of Citizenship and Multiculturalism
Canada	Monte McNaughton	Ontario Secretary of Labour, Immigration, Training and Skills Development
Canada	Ranj Pillai	Premier of Yukon
Canada	Scott Gillingham	Mayor of Winnipeg
Canada	Kimberly Prost	Judge of ICC
Canada	Tessa Virtue	Five-time Olympic medallist
Canada	Alexandre Bilodeau	Retired freestyle skier, Olympian
Canada	Beckie Scott	Retired Cross-country Skier, Olympian
Canada	Brendan Green	Biathlete and cross-country skier, Olympian
Canada	Carol Huynh	Retired Canadian freestyle wrestler, Olympian
Canada	Christine Nesbitt	Retired long track speed skater, Olympian
Canada	Clara Hughes	Cyclist and speed skater, Olympian
Canada	David Ford (kayaker)	Slalom canoeist
Canada	Chandra Crawford	Cross-country skier, Olympian
Canada	Meagan Duhamel	Pair skier, Olympian
Canada	Melissa Bishop-Nriagu	Runner, Olympian
Canada	Michael Barry (cyclist)	Author and former professional road racing cyclist, Olympian
Canada	Michael Janyk	Retired alpine skier, Olympian
Canada	Thomas Grandi	Retired alpine skier, Olympian
Canada	Scott Frandsen	Rower, Olympian
Canada	Devon Kershaw	Retired cross-country skier, Olympian
Canada	Stephanie Labbé	Retired professional soccer player, Olympian
Canada	Tabia Charles	Long jumper, Olympian
Canada	Sara Renner	Retired cross-country skier, Olympian
Canada	Perdita Felicien	Retired hurdler, Olympian
Canada	Rosanna Crawford	Biathlete
Canada	Sarah Wells	Hurdler, Olympian
Canada	Roddy Ward	Cross country ski & biathlon coach
Canada	Milaine Thériault	Retired cross-country skier, Olympian
Canada	Kelly VanderBeek	Retired alpine skier, Olympian
Canada	Kristina Groves	Retired speed skier, Olympian
Canada	Larry Cain	Sprint canoeist, Olympian
Canada	Leah Pells	Retired female track and field athlete, Olympian
Canada	Jennifer Heil	Free-style skier, Olympian
Canada	Jen Kish	Former rugby union player, Olympian
Canada	Kaillie Humphries	Bobsledder, Olympian
Canada	Jayna Hefford	Retired ice hockey player, Olympian
Canada	Drew Goldsack	Cross-country skier, Olympian
Canada	Duff Gibson	Skeleton racer, Olympian
Canada	Georgia Simmerling	Road and track cyclist, Olympian
Canada	Jane Thornton	Olympic rower
Canada	Gilmore Junio	Speedskater, Olympian
Canada	Helen Upperton	Bobsledder, Olympian
Canada	Alex Harvey (skier)	Skier, Olympian
Canada	Hayley Wickenheiser	Hockey player, Six-time Olympian
Canada	Ghislaine Landry	Rugby union player
Canada	Cameron Ahmad	Director of Communications to Office of the prime minister of Canada
Canada	Jeremy Broadhurst	Senior Advisor to the Office of the prime minister of Canada
Canada	Marjorie Michel	Deputy Chief of Staff of the Prime Minister
Canada	John Broadhead	Chief of Political Affairs of the Prime Minister Office
Canada	Olga Radchenko	Head of the Secretariat of the Minister of Immigration, Refugees and Citizenship
Canada	Jason Easton	Head of the Secretariat of the Minister of International Trade
Canada	Vandana Fatima Kattar-Miller	Executive officer of TD Bank, former high-ranking official of the Prime Minister's Office
Canada	Dan Costello	Adviser to the prime minister of Canada on Foreign and Defense Policy
Canada	Ann Fitz-Gerald	Director of the Balsillie School of International Affairs and a professor in Wilfrid Laurier University's Political Science Department
Canada	Keri-Lynn Wilson	Conductor, organizer of the Ukrainian Freedom Orchestra
Canada	Judy Sgro	Chair of the Canada-Taiwan Friendship Group
Canada	Paul Wynnyk	Former Deputy Chief of National Defense Staff of the Canadian Armed Forces, retired Lieutenant General
Canada	Christian Borys	Creator of the resource "Saint Javelin"
Canada	George Dangerfield	Former Attorney of Manitoba
Canada	Mike Greenley	CEO of MDA
Canada	Scott Hamilton	Prison center guard in Calgary
Canada	Shelly Bruce	Chief of Communications Security Canada
Canada	Ahmed Khalid Al-Rawi	Simon Fraser University Fellow
Canada	Donald MacPherson	Executive director of the NGO Canadian Drug Policy Coalition
Canada	John Ossowski	Head of the Canada Border Services Agency
Canada	Roland Paris	Professor and Head of the Graduate School of Public and International Relations at the University of Ottawa
Canada	Heather Stefanson	Premier of Manitoba
Canada	Adrien Blanchard	Press secretary of the Minister of Foreign Affairs of Canada
Canada	François Legault	Premier of Quebec
Canada	Tim Houston	Premier of Nova Scotia
Canada	Blaine Higgs	Premier of New Brunswick
Canada	Dennis King	Premier of Prince Edward Island
Canada	Andrew Furey	Premier of Newfoundland and Labrador
Canada	Caroline Cochrane	Premier of Northwest Territories
Canada	Sandy Silver	Premier of Yukon Territory
Canada	P.J. Akeeagok	Premier of Nunavut
Canada	Margaret Thom	Commissioner of the Northwest Territories
Canada	Angelique Bernard	Commissioner of the Yukon Territories
Canada	Eva Aariak	Commissioner of Nunavut
Canada	Éric Martel	President and CEO of Bombardier Inc.
Canada	Penny H. Wise	President and managing director of 3M Canada
Canada	Timothy Joseph Nohara	President and CEO, Accipiter Radar Technologies
Canada	Linda Wolstencroft	President of Aerospace Business Development Associates Inc.
Canada	Robert Gow	President of Avionics Design Services Ltd.
Canada	Nicholas Shewchenko	President of Biokinetics and Associates Ltd.
Canada	Benjamin Whitney	President of Armo Tool & Abuma Manufacturing
Canada	Debbie Stone	President of AJStone Company Ltd.
Canada	Joseph A. Fisher	Founder of Thornhill Medical
Canada	Alexander Kuyanov	CEO of Alpha Optics Systems Inc.
Canada	John Knowlton	husband of the Minister of National Defense of Canada A. Anand
Canada	Jacques Paul-Robert Prévost	Chief of the Strategic Joint Staff of the Canadian Armed Forces, Major General
Canada	Christopher F. Sutherland	Acting Chief of Staff of the Canadian Armed Forces, Rear Admiral
Canada	Patrice S. Sabourin	Chief of Cyber Operations, Canada's National Defense Headquarters, Brigadier General
Canada	Tod Strickland	Head of the Canadian Forces College in Toronto, Brigadier Generalm Former commander of HMCS Halifax
Canada	Kazimieras Deksnys	Chairman of the Lithuanian-Canadian community
Canada	Leah West	Assistant Professor of International Affairs at the Norman Paterson School of International Affairs at Carleton University
Canada	Stéphane Bergeron	Member of the House of Commons, Bloc Québécois
Canada	Denis Trudel	Member of the House of Commons, Bloc Québécois
Canada	Alexis Brunelle-Duceppe	Member of the House of Commons, Bloc Québécois
Canada	Scott Bishop	Representative of the Canadian Armed Forces to the NATO Military Committee, Vice Admiral
Canada	Bob Rae	Permanent Representative of Canada to the United Nations
Canada	Lubomyr Luciuk	Professor of political geography at the Royal Military College of Canada
Canada	Taras Kuzio	Fellow at the Institute for the Study of Ukraine at the University of Alberta
Canada	Paul Desmarais Jr.	CEO of Power Corporation of Canada
Canada	David Collenette	Chairman of the Canadian NATO Association, former Minister of National Defence
Canada	Dana Larsen	Writer, one of the founders of the Marijuana Party
Canada	Blair Longley	Party leader of the Marijuana Party
Canada	Jyoti Gondek	Mayor of Calgary
Canada	Danielle Smith	Premier of Alberta
Canada	Ed Stelmach	Former Premier of Alberta
Canada	Jean Charest	Former Premier of Quebec
Canada	Peter MacKay	Former attorney general, Cabinet Minister and Member of the House of Commons of Canada
Canada	Katheryn Winnick	Actress
Canada	Jim Carrey	Actor
Canada	Glen Lynch	CEO of Volatus Airspace
Canada	Caroline Xavier	Head of Canada's Communications Security Authority
Canada	Damon Murchison	President and CEO of the investment fund "IG Wealth Management"
Canada	Myroslava Oleksiuk	Activist, mother of Canadian House of Commons member Ivan Baker
Canada	Stephan "Steve" Bandera	Journalist, grandson of Stepan Bandera
Canada	Steven MacBeth	Commander of the Canadian-NATO battalion in Latvia from July 2018 to January 2019, retired lieutenant colonel
Canada	Wade Rutland	Commander of the Canadian-NATO battalion in Latvia from July 2017 to January 2018, colonel
Canada	Philippe Sauve	Commander of the Canadian-NATO battalion in Latvia from January to July 2019, lieutenant colonel
Canada	Sean French	Commander of the Canadian-NATO battalion in Latvia from January to July 2018, lieutenant colonel
Canada	Stephen Harper	Former prime minister of Canada
Canada	Rick Hillier	Former chief of the defence staff
Canada	Ian Scott	Head of broadcasting regulator the Canadian Radio-television and Telecommunications Commission
Canada	Michael Wright	Head of Canadian Forces Intelligence Command
Canada	John Horgan	Former Premier of British Columbia
Canada	Jody Wilson-Raybould	Former Minister of Justice and Attorney General
Canada	Fen Osler Hampson	Chancellor's Professor at Carleton University and President of the World Refugee & Migration Council
Canada	Michael Hood	Former Commander of the Canadian Air Force, retired lieutenant general
Canada	Christyn Cianfarani	President & CEO at Canadian Association of Defence and Security Industries
Canada	Janice Charette	Clerk of the Privy Council of Canada
Canada	Chris Ecklund	Entrepreneur, project manager for recruiting Canadian citizens as mercenaries for the armed forces of Ukraine (Internet resource fightforukraine.ca)
Canada	Joseph Ewatski	Former police chief of Winnipeg
Canada	Douglas Harrison	Chairman of the Board of Directors of the Canadian Commercial Corporation
Canada	Marc Emery	Canadian cannabis rights activist, entrepreneur and politician
Canada	George Furey	Speaker of Senate
Canada	Catherine Tait	CEO of CBC
Canada	Katie Telford	Chief of Staff to the prime minister of Canada
Canada	Meaghan Thumath	Director of the British Columbia Center for Infectious Diseases
Canada	Richard Wilson	Head of a pre-trial detention center in Calgary
Canada	Kevin Ford	President and CEO of Calian Group, chairman of the Board of Directors of the Canadian Association of Defense and Security Sector Industries
Canada	Mona Fortier	President of the Treasury Board
Canada	Richard Foster	CEO and Vice President of L3Harris Technologies Canada, chairman of the Board of Directors of the Aerospace Industries Association of Canada
Canada	David Walmsley	Editor-in-chief of Globe and Mail
Canada	Ron McKinnon	Member of the House of Commons, Liberal Party
Canada	Peter Fragiskatos	Member of the House of Commons, Liberal Party
Canada	Ali Ehsassi	Member of the House of Commons, Liberal Party
Canada	Ken Hardie	Member of the House of Commons, Liberal Party
Canada	Iqra Khalid	Member of the House of Commons, Liberal Party
Canada	Maninder Sidhu	Member of the House of Commons, Liberal Party
Canada	Anita Vandenbeld	Member of the House of Commons, Liberal Party
Canada	Sameer Zuberi	Member of the House of Commons, Liberal Party
Canada	Peter Fonseca	Member of the House of Commons, Liberal Party and former athlete
Canada	Raquel Dancho	Member of the House of Commons, Conservative Party
Canada	Arnold Viersen	Member of the House of Commons, Conservative Party
Canada	David Sweet	Former Member of the House of Commons, Conservative Party
Canada	David Anderson	Former Member of the House of Commons, Conservative Party
Canada	Jasraj Hallan	Member of the House of Commons, Conservative Party
Canada	Randy Hoback	Member of the House of Commons, Conservative Party
Canada	Michael Cooper	Member of the House of Commons, Conservative Party
Canada	Scott Reid	Member of the House of Commons, Conservative Party
Canada	Emmanuel Dubourg	Member of the House of Commons, Liberal Party
Canada	Pierre Poilievre	Leader of the Official Opposition of Canada
Canada	Heather McPherson	Member of the House of Commons, New Democratic Party
Canada	Rob Oliphant	Parliamentary Secretary to the Minister for Foreign Affairs, member of the House of Commons of Parliament from the Liberal Party
Canada	Serge Cormier	Parliamentary Secretary to the Minister of Immigration, Refugees and Citizenship, member of the House of Commons of Parliament from the Liberal Party
Canada	George Chahal	Member of the House of Commons, Liberal Party
Canada	Jean Yip	Member of the House of Commons, Liberal Party
Canada	Newcon International Ltd.	Laser equipment supplier
Canada	Alpha Optics Systems Ltd.	Laser equipment supplier
Canada	Jim Watson	Mayor of Ottawa
Canada	Doug Ford	Premier of Ontario
Canada	Margaret MacMillan	Historian, professor emeritus at the University of Toronto
Canada	Michael Pal	Commander of the Unifire training mission in UK
Canada	Guy Tombs	President of Ridgeway International Canada Inc.
Canada	Johnathan Lee Obst	General manager of Rockwell Collins Canada
Canada	Jim Garrington	CEO of Shark Marine Technologies Inc.
Canada	Blake Dickson	President and CEO of Wade Antenna/Taco Antenna
Canada	Daniel S. Goldberg	President and CEO of Telesat Canada
Canada	Paul Bouchard	President and CEO of Top Ace Holdings Inc.
Canada	Barbara Zvan	President and CEO of University Pension Plan Ontario
Canada	Michael Rousseau	President and CEO of Air Canada
Canada	Andrew D'Souza	Badminton player, co-founder and executive chairman of the financial services company Clearco
Canada	Jordan Banks	Co-founder of Thunder Road Capital
Canada	Maria Della Posta	President of Pratt and Whitney Canada
Canada	Ivonka Survilla	President of the Rada of the Belarusian Democratic Republic in exile
Canada	Larry Rosen	President and CEO of Harry Rosen Inc.
Canada	Michael Serbinis	President and CEO of League Incorporated
Canada	Michael McCain	President and CEO of Maple Leaf Foods
Canada	Eugene Roman	Chair of the Ukrainian Catholic University Foundation
Canada	Allan Rock	Former Canadian Minister of Justice
Canada	Yiagadeesen Samy	Director of the Norman Paterson School of International Affairs
Canada	Peter John Loewen	Director of the Munk School of Global Affairs & Public Policy
Canada	Richard D. Ackerman	President of QinetiQ Canada
Canada	Louis Brunet	Managing Director of Collins Aerospace Canada
Canada	Rick Gerbrecht	President and General Director of Thyssenkrupp Marine Systems Canada Ltd
Canada	David A. Gossen	President of IMP Aerospace and Defence
Canada	Ray Castelli	CEO of Weatherhaven
Canada	Jean-Francois Godbout	Head of Airbus Defence and Space Canada
Canada	Bryan Bayda	Bishop of the Eparchy of Toronto and Eastern Canada in the Ukrainian Greek Catholic Church
Canada	Tamara Bolotenko	Vice Principal at Toronto French School (TFS) – Canada's International School and head of the Help Us Help charity organisation
Canada	Dani Reiss	President and CEO of Canada Goose Inc.
Canada	Wes Hall (businessman)	Executive Chairman of KSS Group of Companies, founder of the BlackNorth Initiative
Canada	Ian D. Smith	CEO of Clearwater Seafoods
Canada	Oleh Lesiuk	President of Fine Arts Association of Canada
Canada	Victor Dodig	President and CEO of Canadian Imperial Bank of Commerce
Canada	Jay N. Janzen	NATO Director of Strategic Communications, former Director General of Strategic Communications for the Canadian National Defense Staff, retired general
Canada	Robert Walker	Vice-president of Volatus Aerospace
Canada	Bradley Field	CEO of PR and Labs Inc. / PRE Labs Inc.
Canada	Ena Rudovics	Representative of the Latvian National Federation of Canada in Edmonton
Canada	Steve Mckeown	President and CEO of Team Eagle Ltd.
Canada	Wesley Armstrong	President of TSL Aerospace Technologies Ltd.
Canada	Sarah Fischer	Spokeswoman for the Conservative Party of Canada
Canada	Michael Crase	Executive director of the Conservative Party of Canada
Canada	Tiff Macklem	Governor of the Bank of Canada
Canada	Tony Clement	Former member of the House of Commons of the Parliament of Canada, director of the Foundation of the Conservative Party of Canada
Canada	Robert Batherson	Chairman of the Conservative Party of Canada
Canada	Robert Staley	Chairman of the Conservative Party of Canada Foundation
Canada	Mark Carney	Former Governor of the Bank of Canada and Bank of England
Canada	Suzanne Cowan	Chairman of Liberal Party
Canada	Felix Marzell	Partner of FM Melanie Joly
Canada	Michael Melling	Head of CTV News
Canada	Scott Moe	Premier of Saskatchewan
Canada	Kevin Mooney	President of Irving Shipbuilding Inc.
Canada	Terry Manion	General manager and Vice President of Raytheon Canada
Canada	Mike Mueller	President and CEO of Aerospace Industries Association of Canada
Canada	Wayne Benson	Executive director of the Conservative Party of Canada
Canada	Stephen M. Van Dine	Senior Vice President of Arctic Governance Institute
Canada	Craig Baines	Commander of the Canadian Navy, Vice Admiral
Canada	Jocelyn Paul	Commander of the Canadian Land Force, Vice Admiral
Canada	Alain Pelletier	Deputy Commander of United States-Canadian North American Aerospace Defense Command (NORAD), Lieutenant General
Canada	Rupert Duchesne	CEO of Mattamy Ventures, President of the Board of Trustees of the Art Gallery of Ontario
Canada	Richard Michael Halenda	Director of The Ultimate Canadian Meat Store
Canada	Stephen J. Dent	Co-founder of Birch Hill Equity Partners
Canada	Kelvin Goertzen	Former Priemer of Manitoba
Canada	Jane Philpott	Former Minister of Health
Canada	Anita Neville	Lieutenant governor of Manitoba
Canada	Stéphane Perrault	Chief Electoral Officer
Canada	Navdeep Bains	Former Minister of Innovation, Science and Industry
Canada	Bernadette Jordan	Former Minister of Fisheries, Oceans and the Canadian Coast Guard
Canada	Catherine McKenna	Former Minister of Environment and Climate Change
Canada	Jean-Yves Duclos	Minister of Health
Canada	Marie-Claude Bibeau	Minister of Agriculture and Agri-Food
Canada	Filomena Tassi	Minister responsible for the Federal Economic Development Agency for Southern Ontario
Canada	Jonathan Wilkinson	Minister of Natural Resources
Canada	Marc Parent	President and CEO of CAE Inc.
Canada	Rocco Rossi	President and CEO of Ontario Chamber of Commerce
Canada	Bob Auchterlonie	Commander of Canadian Joint Operations Command, Vice Admiral
Canada	John Baird	Former Minister of Foreign Affairs of Canada
Canada	Derek Burney	Former Chief of Staff to the prime minister of Canada, former Ambassador to the United States, Honorary Chancellor of Lakehead University
Canada	David Vigneault	Director of the Canadian Security Intelligence Service
Canada	Eileen de Villa	Head of the Toronto Department of Health
Canada	Mélanie Joly	Foreign Affairs Minister of Canada
Canada	Yvan Blondin	Former commander of the Canadian Air Force
Canada	Conrad Black	Former newspaper publisher, businessperson, writer and convicted fraudster
Canada	Gwen Boniface	Senator for Ontario
Canada	Graham Bowley	Husband of Deputy PM Chrystia Freeland
Canada	Brian Brennan	Deputy Commissioner of the Royal Canadian Mounted Police
Canada	Stuart Beare	Former Commander of Canadian Forces Operations Command, retired lieutenant general
Canada	Michael Byers	Professor of University of British Columbia
Canada	Charles Grier	Prison center guard in Calgary
Canada	Mark Greenley	CEO of MDA Ltd
Canada	Ralph Goodale	Canadian High Commissioner to the United Kingdom
Canada	James Davies	President, CEO and co-owner of shipbuilding company Chantier Davie Canada Inc.
Canada	Charles Burton	Senior Fellow, MacDonald-Laurier Institute
Canada	Len Derkach	Former chairman of the Manitoba Business Council
Canada	Walter Dlugosh	CEO of Carpathia Credit Union Limited
Canada	Eleanor Dawson	Judge of Federal Court of Appeal
Canada	Jason Kenney	Former Premier of Alberta
Canada	David Eby	Premier of British Columbia
Canada	Eric Kenny	Commander of the Canadian Air Force, Lieutenant General
Canada	W. Edmund Clark	Former president and CEO of TD Bank Group
Canada	Andrew Coates	Manager at Lockheed Martin Canada
Canada	James D. Irving	CEO of Irving Shipbuilding Inc.
Canada	Martine Irman	Chairman of the Board of Directors of the Canadian Export Development Corporation
Canada	Anne Kelly	head of the Federal Prison Service of Canada
Canada	Scott Bell	Police Sergeant of Winnipeg
Canada	Lorraine Ben	CEO of Lockheed Martin Canada
Canada	Anita Anand	Defence Minister of Canada
Canada	Bill Matthews	Deputy Minister of National Defence
Canada	Wayne Eyre	Chief of the Defence Staff of the Canadian Armed Forces
Canada	Francois-Philippe Champagne	Minister of Innovation, Science and Industry of Canada
Canada	Sean Fraser	Minister of Immigration, Refugees and Citizenship of Canada
Canada	Marco Mendicino	Minister of Public Safety
Canada	Karina Gould	Minister of Families, Children and Social Development
Canada	Oz Jungic	Political Advisor to the Office of the prime minister of Canada
Canada	Ludwik Klimovski	Chairman, Memorial to the Victims of Communism Construction Board
Canada	Howard Sokolowski	Major donor to the Memorial to the Victims of Communism
Canada	Alide Forstmanis	Treasurer, Memorial to the Victims of Communism Construction Board
Canada	Robert Tmegl	Member, Memorial to the Victims of Communism Construction Board
Canada	Ivan Grbesic	Member, Memorial to the Victims of Communism Construction Board
Canada	James C. Temerty	Founder, the Temerty Foundation
Canada	Khristina Dang	Member, Memorial to the Victims of Communism Construction Board
Canada	Mary Ng	Minister of Families, Children and Social Development of Canada
Canada	Christopher Allan Robinson	Commander of the Pacific Fleet of the Canadian Navy and the Joint Operational Force in the Pacific, Rear Admiral
Canada	Marcus Kolga	Senior Fellow at the Macdonald-Laurier Institute
Canada	Sarah Paquet	Director and chief executive officer of the Financial Transactions and Reports Analysis Centre of Canada
Canada	Alexandra Chyczij	President of the Ukrainian Canadian Congress
Canada	John Risley	co-founder of Clearwater Foods, president and CEO of CFFI Ventures
Canada	Som Seif	Founder and CEO of Purpose Unlimited
Canada	Michael Katchen	Founder and CEO of Wealthsimple Investment Company
Canada	Tony Lourakis	Founder and CEO of Fleet Complete
Canada	Lawrence Zimmering	Co-founder and Chairman of CanCap Management Inc.
Canada	Brice Scheschuk	Partner and Chief Accountant of Globalive
Canada	Dave Filipchuk	President and CEO of PCL Constructors Inc.
Canada	Hartley T. Richardson	President and CEO of James Richardson & Sons, Ltd.
Canada	Robert B. Espey	President and CEO of Parkland
Canada	Daniel J. Daviau	President and CEO of Cannacord Genuity
Canada	Darren Throop	President and CEO of Cannacord Genuity
Canada	Geoff Smith	President, CEO and director of EllisDon Corporation
Canada	Bruce Poon Tip	Founder of G Adventures
Canada	Brad Bradford	Urban planner and politician. Commissioner of the Toronto Transit Commission Board
Canada	David Ossip	Chairman and CEO of Ceridian HCM Holding Inc.
Canada	Claude Germain	Managing Partner of Rouge River Capital
Canada	Brent Belzberg	Founder and Senior Managing Partner of TorQuest
Canada	Gordon Capern	Partner at Paliare Roland Barristers Law Firm
Canada	Jean-Francois Courville	Managing Partner of Purpose Advisor Solutions
Canada	David Jonathan Kassie	Chairman of Cannacord Capital
Canada	Leslie Woo	CEO of the CivicAction Leadership Foundation
Canada	John M. Beck	Founder and Chairman of Aecon Group Inc.
Canada	Peter Gilgan	Founder of Mattamy Homes
Canada	Marc Mathyk	Designer, founder of Veridian Global Design
Canada	Michael Wertelecky	Vice-president of The Huculak Family Foundation
Canada	Louis-Marie Beaulieu	Chairman of the board of directors and CEO of Groupe Desganes Inc.
Canada	Boris Wertz	Chairman and CEO of Version One Ventures
Canada	Paul J. Hill	Executive Chairman of The Hill Companies
Canada	Stephen Smith	Executive Chairman of First National Financial Corporation Mortgage Company
Canada	Peter Malajczuk	Second Deputy Chairman of the Board of Directors of the Ukrainian Credit Union, Vice President of Bell Media Enterprises
Canada	Marc Barrenechea	CEO of OpenText
Canada	Matthew Corrin	Founder, Chairman and former CEO of Freshii
Canada	Mohamad Fakih	President and CEO of Paramount Fine Foods
Canada	Adam Palmer	Chief constable of the Vancouver Police Department
Canada	Mark Neufeld	Chief constable of the Calgary Police Department
Canada	Tyler Shandro	Minister of Justice and Solicitor General of Alberta
Canada	Ken Krawetz	Former Deputy Premier of Saskatchewan and Deputy Leader of the Saskatchewan Party
Canada	Madeleine Redfern	Former mayor of Iqaluit, Nunavut, CEO of CanArctic Inuit Networks Inc.
Canada	Arlene Dickinson	General partner of District Ventures Capital and CEO of Venturepark
Canada	Art DeFehr	Chairman of Palliser Furniture;
Canada	Chandra Arya	Member of the House of Commons, Liberal Party
Canada	Vance Badawey	Member of the House of Commons, Liberal Party
Canada	Tony Baldinelli	Member of the House of Commons, Conservative Party
Canada	John Barlow	Member of the House of Commons, Conservative Party
Canada	Michael Barrett	Member of the House of Commons, Conservative Party
Canada	Xavier Barsalou-Duval	Member of the House of Commons, Bloc Québécois
Canada	Raymond J. de Souza	Catholic priest, editor-in-chief of the Convivium magazine
Canada	Brent Hawkes	Protestant pastor, LGBT community activist
Canada	Chantal Kreviazuk	Singer and songwriter
Canada	Ian Scott	Chairperson of the Canadian Radio-television and Telecommunications Commission (CRTC)
Canada	Scott Shortliffe	Executive director of the CCTV Broadcasting
Canada	Dennis Kovtun	Columnist for The Hill Times
Canada	Michael Charles Wright	Head of the intelligence command of the Canadian Armed Forces
Canada	Mark Lamarre	CEO of Seaspan Shipyards
Canada	Roman Shimonov	Member of the Board of Directors of the Canadian-Ukrainian Chamber of Commerce, founder and CEO of the defense firm Roshel
Canada	Rafal Rohozinski	Head of Cybersecurity Companies Zeropoint Security and Secdev Group, Research Fellow at the Center for International Governance Innovation (CIGI)
Canada	Paul Deegan	President and CEO, News Media Canada
Canada	Gary Keller	vice president of the consulting firm StrategyCorp, former head of the secretariat of the Canadian Minister of Foreign Affairs
Canada	Claude Doucet	Secretary General at CRTC
Canada	Bill Blair	President of the Privy Council
Canada	Jagmeet Singh	NDP Leader of Canada
Canada	Yves-François Blanchet	Bloc Québécois Leader
Canada	Elizabeth May	Green Party Parliamentary Leader
Canada	Wayne Wouters	Former Clerk of the Privy Council
Canada	Erin O’Toole	Member of the House of Commons, Conservative Party
Canada	Michael Chong	Member of the House of Commons, Conservative Party
Canada	Garnett Genuis	Member of the House of Commons, Conservative Party
Canada	Marc Garneau	Member of the House of Commons, Liberal Party
Canada	Jim Carr	Member of the House of Commons, Liberal Party
Canada	John McKay	Member of the House of Commons, Liberal Party
Canada	Jean-François Tremblay	Deputy Secretary to the Cabinet
Canada	Candice Bergen	Former Leader of the Official Opposition and former interim leader of the Conservative party
Canada	Andrew Scheer	Former Opposition House Leader
Canada	Peter Van Loan	Member of Parliament for York—Simcoe
Canada	Raynell Andreychuk	Senator from Saskatchewan
Canada	Dean Allison	Member of Parliament for Niagara West
Canada	Paul Dewar (d. 2019)	Former Member of Parliament for Ottawa Centre
Canada	Irwin Cotler	Former Member of Parliament for Mount Royal
Canada	Ted Opitz	Former Member of Parliament for Etobicoke Centre
Canada	Chrystia Freeland	Deputy Prime Minister of Canada
Canada	James Bezan	Member of Parliament for Selkirk—Interlake—Eastman
Canada	Paul Grod	President of the Ukrainian Canadian Congress
Czech Republic	Štefan Füle	Former European Commissioner for Enlargement and European Neighbourhood Policy
Czech Republic	Karel Schwarzenberg (d. 2023)	Member of Parliament
Czech Republic	Jaromír Štětina	Journalist and politician
Czech Republic	Marek Ženíšek	Member of Parliament
Czech Republic	VOP – 026 Šternberk, s.p.	Arms manufacturer in Czech republic
Czech Republic	Mil International spol. s r.o.	Arms manufacturer in Czech republic
Czech Republic	Excalibur Army spol	Arms manufacturer in Czech republic
Czech Republic	Explosia a.s.	Explosives manufacturer in Czech republic
Denmark	Thomas Ahrenkiel	
Denmark	Daniel Carlsen	Danish former nationalist politician and former neo-Nazi
Denmark	Lene Espersen	Former leader of the Conservative People's Party
Denmark	Per Stig Møller	Member or Parliament
Estonia	Tunne Kelam	Former Member of the European Parliament
Estonia	Meelis Kiili	Former Commander of the Estonian Defence League
Estonia	Kristiina Ojuland	Former Minister of Foreign Affairs and a former Member of the European Parliament
Estonia	Kaja Kallas	Prime Minister
Estonia	Kersti Kaljulaid	Former president
Estonia	Eerik-Niiles Kross	Member of the Estonian Parliament's Foreign Affairs Committee
Estonia	Marko Mihkelson	Chairman of the Estonian Parliament's Foreign Affairs Committee
Estonia	Kalle Laanet	Minister of Justice
Estonia	Mihhail Lotman	MP
Estonia	Henn Põlluaas	MP,former Speaker of the Estonian Parliament
Estonia	Jüri Ratas	MP,former Prime Minister
Estonia	Lauri Hussar	Speaker of the Estonian Parliament
Estonia	Margus Tsahkna	Minister of Foreign Affairs
Estonia	Andres Parve	Advisor of the Ministry of the Interior and former leader of the Estonian Defence Industry Association
Estonia	Urmas Reinsalu	Former Minister of Justice and former Minister of Defence
Estonia	Arnold Sinisalu	Head Director of the Estonian Internal Security Service
Estonia	Riho Terras	Former commander of the Estonian Defence Forces
Estonia	Artur Tiganik	Former Deputy Commander of the Estonian Defence Forces
Estonia	Baltic Armament OÜ	Arms manufacturer in Estonia
Finland	Heidi Hautala	Member of the European Parliament
France	Bernard-Henri Lévy	Author
France	Henri Malosse	President of the European Economic and Social Committee
France	Bruno Le Roux	Member of the French General Assembly for Seine-Saint-Denis
France	BNP Paribas	French international banking group
France	Natixis	French corporate and investment bank
France	Crédit Agricole	French international banking group and the world's largest cooperative financial institution
France	RN Bank	Moscow-based joint venture bank established in 2013 and owned by UniCredit Bank Russia (as majority holder), RCI Banque and Nissan
Germany	Uwe Corsepius	Former Secretary-General of the Council of the European Union
Germany	Karl Müllner	Former Inspector of the German Air Force
Germany	Katrin Suder	Former State Secretary in the Federal Ministry of Defense
Germany	Michael Fuchs	Former Member of the Bundestag
Germany	Karl-Georg Wellmann	Former Member of the Bundestag
Germany	Rebecca Harms	Former Member of the European Parliament
Germany	Bernd Posselt	Former Member of the European Parliament
Germany	Peter Tiede	Journalist and reporter of Bild
Germany	Deutsche Bank	German multinational investment bank and financial services company headquartered in Frankfurt
Germany	BMW Bank	Finance service and a company of the BMW Group
Germany	Commerzbank	Major German bank operating as a universal bank
Germany	Motorola Solutions Germany GmbH	Subsidiary of Motorola Solutions
Germany	Schaeffler Group	Manufacturer of rolling element bearings for automotive, aerospace and industrial uses
Germany	Atlas Elektronik	Naval/marine electronics and systems business
Germany	Jenoptik	Photonics group
Germany	Sauer & Sohn	Manufacturer of firearms and machinery and oldest firearms manufacturer still active in Germany
Germany	Rohde & Schwarz	International electronics group specializing in the fields of electronic test equipment, broadcast & media, cybersecurity, radiomonitoring and radiolocation, and radiocommunication
Germany	Mercedes-Benz Bank Rus	Subsidiary of Daimler AG
Germany	NDGS Novy Dizel Gearbox Service GmbH	Machine construction
Germany	e.sigma Systems GmbH	Specialized supplier of integrated training solutions for international armed forces, security agencies and industrial clients
Germany	Glenair GmbH	Electronic parts supplier
Germany	Intecs Security	Security system supplier
Germany	SIGNALIS	Subsidiary of Airbus since its creation in 2011
Germany	in-innovative navigation GmbH	Software company
Germany	iMAR Navigation GmbH	Specialist on inertial navigation and gyroscope technology
Germany	Fritz Werner Industrie-Ausrüstungen GmbH	Industrial equipment supplier
Germany	PKI Electronic Intelligence GmbH	Hardware training institute
Germany	Schirin Nobiev Exporthandel	
Germany	Spekon GmbH	Textile company
Germany	Secure Information Management GmbH – SIM Secure	Security system supplier
Germany	Force Ware GmbH	Manufacturer of professional mine detectors and bomb locators
Germany	SET – Stange Energietechnik	Manufacturer in Germany
Greece	Theodoros Margellos (d. 2021)	
Hungary	OTP Bank	Largest commercial bank of Hungary and one of the largest independent financial service providers in Central and Eastern Europe and with banking services for private individuals and corporate clients
Ireland	Micheál Martin	Prime minister
Ireland	Leo Varadkar	Deputy head
Ireland	Seán Ó Fearghaíl	Speaker of Lower House
Ireland	Simon Coveney	Foreign Minister and Defense Minister
Ireland	Paschal Donohoe	Finance Minister
Ireland	Thomas Byrne (Meath politician)	European Affairs Minister
Ireland	Helen McEntee	Justice Minister
Ireland	Charles Flanagan	Chair of the Committee on Foreign Affairs and Defence
Ireland	Joe McHugh	Chair of the Committee on European Union Affairs
Ireland	John McGuinness	Chair of the Committee on Finance, Public Expenditure and Reform, and Taoiseach
Ireland	James Lawless	Chair of the Committee on Justice
Ireland	Richard Bruton	Chair of Fine Gael Parliamentary Party
Ireland	Niamh Smyth	Chair of the Committee on Media, Tourism, Arts, Culture, Sport and the Gaeltacht
Ireland	Joe Carey	Chair of Shannon Airport Oireachtas Group
Ireland	Jennifer Carroll MacNeill	Vice-chair of Parliamentary Party + Justice Committee
Ireland	Brendan Griffin	Deputy Government Chief Whip
Ireland	Niall Blaney	Senator
Ireland	Robbie Gallagher	Senator
Ireland	Paul Daly	Senator
Ireland	Timmy Dooley	Senator
Ireland	Lorraine Clifford-Lee	Senator
Ireland	Lisa Chambers	Senator
Ireland	Gerry Horkan	Senator
Ireland	Niall Blaney	Senator
Ireland	Diarmuid Wilson	Senator
Ireland	Ned O'Sullivan	Senator
Ireland	Fiona O'Loughlin (politician)	Senator
Ireland	Denis O'Donovan	Senator
Ireland	Erin McGreehan	Senator
Ireland	Ollie Crowe	Senator
Ireland	Gerard Craughwell	Independent Senator
Ireland	Billy Kelleher	MEP
Ireland	Jim O'Callaghan	MP
Ireland	John Lahart	MP
Ireland	Ciarán Cannon	MP
Ireland	Barry Cowen	MP
Ireland	Cathal Crowe	MP
Ireland	Jackie Cahill	MP
Ireland	Alan Dillon	MP
Ireland	Cormac Devlin	MP
Ireland	Pádraig O’Sullivan	MP
Ireland	Jennifer Murnane O'Connor	MP
Ireland	Christopher O'Sullivan	MP
Ireland	Neale Richmond	MP, Spokesperson on European Affairs
Ireland	Alan Farrell	MP
Ireland	John Paul Phelan	MP
Ireland	Michael Ring	MP
Ireland	Paul McAuliffe	MP
Ireland	Michael Moynihan	MP
Ireland	Willie O'Dea	MP
Ireland	Seán Haughey	MP
Ireland	Ivana Bacik	Leader of the Labour Party
Italy	UniCredit	International banking group headquartered in Milan
Italy	Intesa Sanpaolo	International banking group
Japan	Fumio Kishida	Prime minister of Japan
Japan	Tarō Asō	Former prime minister of Japan
Japan	Yoshihide Suga	Former prime minister of Japan
Japan	Yoshihiko Noda	Former prime minister of Japan
Japan	Tomomi Inada	Former Minister of Defense
Japan	Yasukazu Hamada	Former Minister of Defense
Japan	Shinjirō Koizumi	Former Minister of the Environment
Japan	Yukio Edano	Former Leader of the Constitutional Democratic Party
Japan	Keiji Furuya	Head of the Japan-ROC Diet Members' Consultative Council
Japan	Shigeru Ishiba	Leader of the Suigetsukai party faction
Japan	Gen Nakatani	Former Minister of Defense
Japan	Nobuo Kishi	Defense Minister of Japan
Japan	Yoshimasa Hayashi	Foreign Minister of Japan
Japan	Yoshihisa Furukawa	Justice Minister of Japan
Japan	Shunichi Suzuki	Finance Minister of Japan
Japan	Hirokazu Matsuno	Chief Cabinet Secretary
Japan	Takeo Akiba	Secretary General of the National Security Council
Japan	Akiko Santo	President of the House of Councilors
Japan	Hiroyuki Hosoda	President of the House of Representatives
Japan	Sanae Takaichi	Member of the House of Representatives, Chairwoman of the Political Council of the LDP
Japan	Masahisa Sato	Member of the House of Councilors, Chairman of the LDP Foreign Policy Council
Japan	Kōji Yamazaki	Chief of the Joint Staff of the Self-Defense Forces
Japan	Tomoko Abe	Chairwoman of the House Select Committee on Okinawa and Northern Affairs
Japan	Kazuo Shii	Member of the House of Representatives, Chairman of the Communist Party of Japan
Japan	Keiji Kokuta	Member of the House of Representatives from the Communist Party of Japan
Japan	Ken Saito	Member of the House of Representatives
Japan	Yatagawa Hajime	Member of the House of Representatives
Japan	Mito Kakizawa	Member of the House of Representatives
Japan	Yoshiaki Wada	Member of the House of Representatives
Japan	Hirofumi Ryu	Member of the House of Representatives
Japan	Yoshitaka Sakurada	Member of the House of Representatives, former Minister for the Tokyo Olympic and Paralympic Games
Japan	Kenta Izumi	Leader of the Constitutional Democratic Party
Japan	Nobuyuki Baba	Leader of the Japan Innovation Party
Japan	Norikazu Suzuki	Member of the House of Representatives
Japan	Atsushi Suzuki	Member of the House of Representatives
Japan	Susumu Yamaguchi	Member of the House of Representatives
Japan	Daisuke Nishino	Member of the House of Representatives
Japan	Hidehiro Mitani	Member of the House of Representatives
Japan	Masanobu Ogura	Member of the House of Representatives
Japan	Gemma Kentaro	Member of the House of Representatives
Japan	Kensuke Onishi	Member of the House of Representatives
Japan	Minoru Kihara	Member of the House of Representatives, Member of the Nippon Kaigi Diet discussion group
Japan	Akihisa Nagashima	Member of the House of Representatives, Member of the Nippon Kaigi Diet discussion group
Japan	Shinji Inoue	Former Minister of State, Member of the Nippon Kaigi Diet discussion group
Japan	Sakurada Kengo	President and CEO of Sompo Holdings, Chairman of the Japanese Association of Corporate Leaders Keizai Doyukai
Japan	Hirohiko Iizuka	President of Sankei Shimbun
Japan	Toshikazu Yamaguchi	President of Yomiuri Shimbun
Japan	Naotoshi Okada	Chairman of Nikkei Shimbun
Japan	Tsuyoshi Hasebe	President of Nikkei Shimbun
Japan	Seishi Kumano	Member of the House of Councilors from the Komeito Party
Japan	Makoto Oniki	Senior Parliamentary Deputy Minister of Defense
Japan	Tsuyohito Iwamoto	Senior Parliamentary Deputy Minister of Defense
Japan	Yasutaka Nakasone	Parliamentary Deputy Minister of Defense
Japan	Hirohiko Ono	Director-general for Press and Public Diplomacy
Japan	Mitsuko Ishii	Member of the House of Councilors from Japan Innovation Party
Japan	Yuko Mori	Member of the House of Councilors for the Constitutional Democratic Party
Japan	Kosaburo Nishime	Minister of State for Okinawa and Northern Affairs, Head of the Northern Territories Action Headquarters under the Office of the Cabinet of Ministers
Japan	Rui Matsukawa	Member of the House of Councilors, Deputy Chairwoman of the LDP Council for National Defense, Deputy Chairman of the LDP Council for Foreign Policy
Japan	Suzuki Kazuto	Professor of science and technology policy at the Graduate School of Public Policy at the University of Tokyo and senior fellow of the Asia Pacific Initiative
Japan	MS Bank Rus MC Bank Rus before Bank Capital Moscow	Subsidiary of Mitsubishi Corporation
Japan	Toyota Financial Services Russia	Subsidiary of Toyota Motor Corporation
Japan	MUFG Bank	Largest bank in Japan
Japan	SBI Bank LLC	Largest bank in Japan
Japan	JSC Solid Bank	Russian-Japanese Bank
South Korea	Woori Bank	South Korean multinational bank headquartered in Seoul
South Korea	Hana Bank	Commercial Bank
Latvia	Solvita Āboltiņa	
Latvia	Sandra Kalniete	Member of the European Parliament
Latvia	Vaira Vīķe-Freiberga	Former president
Latvia	Egils Levits	Former president
Latvia	Krišjānis Kariņš	Former Prime Minister
Latvia	Evika Siliņa	Prime Minister
Latvia	Edvards Ratnieks	Deputy Mayor of Riga
Latvia	Aleksandrs Kiršteins	MP
Latvia	Rihards Kozlovskis	Minister of Interior
Latvia	Andris Sprūds	Minister of Defense
Latvia	Artis Pabriks	Member of the European Parliament 2014–2018, Ministers of Defence of Latvia 2019-present
Latvia	Inese Vaidere	Member of the European Parliament
Latvia	Roberts Zīle	Member of the European Parliament
Lithuania	Petras Auštrevičius	
Lithuania	Gediminas Grina	
Lithuania	Andrius Kubilius	
Lithuania	Gabrielius Landsbergis	
Lithuania	Jovita Neliupšienė	
Lithuania	Artūras Paulauskas	
Lithuania	Edmundas Vaitekūnas	
Lithuania	Mantas Adomėnas	former Deputy Minister of Foreign Affairs of Lithuania
Lithuania	Ewelina Dobrowolska	Minister of Justice
Lithuania	Gintarė Skaistė	Minister of Finance
Lithuania	Valdemaras Rupšys	Chief of Defense
Lithuania	Defensa UAB	Arms manufacturer in Lithuania
Lithuania	JSC Defensus	Arms manufacturer in Lithuania
Lithuania	ASU Baltija JCS	Arms manufacturer in Lithuania
Lithuania	Helisota UAB	Arms manufacturer in Lithuania
Lithuania	Aviabaltika Aviation Ltd.	Arms manufacturer in Lithuania
Moldova	Ana Revenco	Minister of Internal Affairs
Moldova	Oazu Nantoi	MP
Moldova	Olesea Stamate	MP
Moldova	Lilian Carp	MP
Moldova	Oleg Bucataru	Deputy director of the border police
Moldova	Petru Macovei	Director of the Independent Press Association
Montenegro	Ranko Krivokapić	Minister of Foreign Affairs of Montenegro
Montenegro	Raško Konjević	Minister of Defense
Montenegro	Savo Kentera	Former director of National Security
Montenegro	Tara Aerospace and Defense Products AD	
Montenegro	Montenegro Defence Industry d.o.o. Podgorica	
Montenegro	Armada Group	
Netherlands	Hans van Baalen (d. 2021)	Former member of the European Parliament
Netherlands	Louis Bontes	Member of the Dutch Parliament
Netherlands	Michiel Servaes	Member of the Dutch Parliament
Netherlands	ING Group	Dutch multinational banking and financial services corporation
New Zealand	Jacinda Ardern	Prime minister
New Zealand	Grant Robertson	Deputy Prime Minister
New Zealand	Cindy Kiro	Governor General
New Zealand	Nanaia Mahuta	Minister of Foreign Affairs
New Zealand	Peeni Henare	Minister of Defense
New Zealand	Michael Wood	Minister of Transport
New Zealand	Meka Whaitiri	Minister of Customs
New Zealand	Megan Woods	Minister of Housing
New Zealand	Stuart Nash	Minister for Economic and Regional Development
New Zealand	John Anthony	Journalist of The New Zealand Herald
New Zealand	Willie Jackson	Minister for Māori Development
New Zealand	Kris Faafoi	Minister of Justice
New Zealand	Poto Williams	Minister for Building and Construction
New Zealand	Priyanca Radhakrishnan	Minister for the Community and Voluntary Sector
New Zealand	David Parker	Attorney-General
New Zealand	Damien O'Connor	Minister of Agriculture
New Zealand	Chris Hipkins	Minister for COVID-19 Response
New Zealand	Kiri Allan	Minister of Conservation
New Zealand	Kelvin Davis	Minister for Māori Crown Relations: Te Arawhiti
New Zealand	Jan Tinetti	Minister of Internal Affairs
New Zealand	David Clark	Minister of Commerce and Consumer Affairs
New Zealand	Carmel Sepuloni	Minister for Social Development and Employment
New Zealand	Ayesha Verrall	Minister for Food Safety
New Zealand	William Sio	Minister for Courts
New Zealand	Andrew Little	Minister of Health
New Zealand	Shane Arndell	Deputy chief of the naval forces
New Zealand	Stephen Hoadley	Associate Professor at the University of Auckland
New Zealand	Andy Foster	Mayor of Wellington
New Zealand	Lianne Dalziel	Mayor of Christchurh
New Zealand	Rachel Reese	Mayor of Nelson
New Zealand	Aaron Hawkins	Mayor of Dunedin
New Zealand	Phil Goff	Mayor of Auckland
New Zealand	Phil Twyford	Minister for Disarmament and Arms Control
New Zealand	Andrew Bridgman	Secretary of Defence and chief executive of the Ministry of Defence
New Zealand	Ron Mark	40th Minister of Defence
New Zealand	Michael Boggs	CEO of New Zealand Media and Entertainment (NZME)
New Zealand	Sinead Boucher	CEO of Stuff Ltd
New Zealand	Paul Thompson (media executive)	Chief executive and editor-in-chief of Radio New Zealand
New Zealand	Clarke Gayford	Television presenter, radio host, fiancé of the Prime Minister Ardern
New Zealand	David Proctor	Chief of Navy
New Zealand	Jim Gilmour	Commander Joint Forces New Zealand
New Zealand	Garin Golding	Maritime Component Commander
New Zealand	Rose King	Deputy Chief of Army
New Zealand	Matthew Weston	Chief People Officer, New Zealand Defence Force
New Zealand	Bridget Musker	Chief financial officer, New Zealand Defence Force
New Zealand	Pasanka Wickremasinghe	Chief financial officer at the Ministry of Defence
New Zealand	John Boswell	Chief of Army
New Zealand	Kevin Short	Secretary of Defence and chief executive of the Ministry of Defenc
New Zealand	Andrew Hampton	Head of GCSB
New Zealand	Tony Davies	Vice chief of Ministry of Defence
New Zealand	Rebecca Kitteridge	Director of the New Zealand Security Intelligence Service
New Zealand	Trevor Mallard	Speaker of the House of Representatives
New Zealand	Louisa Wall	MP
New Zealand	Simon O'Connor	MP
New Zealand	Ingrid Leary	MP
Poland	Bogdan Borusewicz	Speaker of the Polish Senate
Poland	Jerzy Buzek	
Poland	Ryszard Czarnecki	
Poland	Andrzej Fałkowski	
Poland	Anna Fotyga	
Poland	Maciej Hunia	
Poland	Paweł Kowal	Chairman of the EU-Ukraine Parliamentary Cooperation Committee
Poland	Stanisław Koziej	Head of the National Security Bureau
Poland	Radosław Kujawa	
Poland	Robert Kupiecki	Deputy Minister of National Defence
Poland	Ryszard Legutko	Former Minister of Education of Poland
Poland	Adam Lipiński	Member of the Sejm
Poland	Marek Migalski	Member of the European Parliament
Poland	Agnieszka Pomaska	Member of the Sejm
Poland	Jacek Saryusz-Wolski	Member of the European Parliament
Poland	Marek Siwiec	Member of the European Parliament
Poland	Marek Tomaszycki	Army Officer
Poland	Zbigniew Włosowicz	
Poland	Bumar-Labedy	Arms manufacturer based in Poland, Division of the Polish Armaments Group
Poland	FIN Sp. z oo	Arms manufacturer based in Poland
Poland	CENZIN Sp. z oo	Arms manufacturer based in Poland, Division of the Polish Armaments Group
Poland	SELW-2 Sp. z oo	Arms manufacturer based in Poland
Poland	Level 11 Sp. z oo	Arms manufacturer based in Poland
Poland	Mesko	Arms manufacturer based in Poland
Poland	Wtorplast S.A.	Arms manufacturer based in Poland
Poland	BRJ Sp. z oo	Arms manufacturer based in Poland
Poland	Nattan S.C.	Arms manufacturer based in Poland
Poland	Militus-PL	Arms manufacturer based in Poland
Poland	BRJ Sp. z oo	Arms manufacturer based in Poland
Romania	Iulian Chifu	
Romania	Tiberiu-Liviu Chodan	
Romania	Adrian Cioroianu	Former Romanian Minister of Foreign Affairs
Romania	Gheorghe Hațegan	
Romania	Eugen Tomac	Member of the European Parliament
Slovakia	ZŤS-OTS, a.s.Dubnica n.V.	Arms manufactor in Slovakia
Slovakia	J&T	Investment group
Slovakia	ZTS – ŠPECIÁL, a.s.	Arms manufactor in Slovakia
Slovakia	ZTS – ŠPECIÁL, a.s.	Arms manufactor in Slovakia
Slovakia	VERSOR s.r.o	Arms manufactor in Slovakia
Slovakia	Robus s.r.o	Arms manufactor in Slovakia
Slovakia	S. M. S. spol. s.r.o.	Arms manufactor in Slovakia
Spain	José Ignacio Salafranca Sánchez-Neyra	Member of the European Parliament
Spain	Ramón Luis Valcárcel	President of the Region of Murcia
Sweden	Gunnar Hökmark	Member of the European Parliament
Sweden	Anna Maria Corazza Bildt	Member of the European Parliament
Sweden	Lena Adelsohn Liljeroth	Former Member of the Riksdag
Sweden	Odd Werin	Rear Admiral, Sweden's military representative to NATO and EU
Sweden	Marietta de Pourbaix-Lundin	Former Member of the Riksdag
Sweden	Gunnar Karlsson	Head of the Swedish Military Intelligence and Security Service
Sweden	Magnus Söderman	Former leader of the Swedish Resistance Movement
Sweden	Ikano Bank	Consumer finance bank established in 1995 by Ingvar Kamprad
Sweden	SEB Group	Northern European financial services group
Switzerland	Credit Suisse	Global investment bank and financial services firm founded and based in Switzerland
Switzerland	UBS	Global investment bank and financial services firm founded and based in Switzerland
Ukraine	Dmytro Kuleba	Minister of Foreign Affairs
Ukraine	Oleksandr Turchynov	Former acting president
Ukraine	Stepan Poltorak	Former Minister of Defence of Ukraine
Ukraine	Viktor Muzhenko	Former Chief of the General Staff and the commanding officer of the Armed Forces of Ukraine
Ukraine	Tina Karol	Singer, actress, and television presenter
Ukraine	Dorofeeva	Singer, actress, fashion designer, blogger and television presenter
Ukraine	Mila Sivatskaya	Actress
Ukraine	Svetlana Loboda	Singer and composer
Ukraine	NK (singer)	Singer and composer
Ukraine	Potap	Singer, rapper, songwriter and producer
Ukraine	Nikolai Serga	Singer, rapper, songwriter and producer
Ukraine	Dmytro Komarov	Journalist and TV producer
Ukraine	Yevgeny Komarovsky	Pediatrician, doctor of the highest category, writer, TV presenter
Ukraine	Vitali Klitschko	Politician and former professional boxer who serves as mayor of Kyiv and head of the Kyiv City State Administration,
Ukraine	Alan Badoev	Movie director, music video director, screenwriter, TV producer, TV presenter and music producer of Ossetian origin
Ukraine	Anton Ptushkin	TV Presenter of Oryol i Reshka
Ukraine	Marina Grankina	TV Presenter of Oryol i Reshka
Ukraine	Andriy Bednyakov	TV Presenter of Oryol i Reshka
Ukraine	Jamala	Singer and composer
Ukraine	Alekseev (singer)	Singer
Ukraine	Max Barskih	Singer
Ukraine	Oleksii Zavgorodnii	Singer
Ukraine	Ustym Pokhmurskyi	Singer
Ukraine	Iryna Shvaidak	Singer
Ukraine	Yuri Gennadievich Kaplan	Singer
Ukraine	Olena Synelnykova	TV Producer
Ukraine	Alina Pash	Singer and rapper
Ukraine	Verka Serduchka	Singer, actor and composer
Ukraine	Monatik	Singer, dancer and composer
Ukraine	Ivan Dorn	Singer, actor and composer
Ukraine	Andrey Makarevich	Rock musician
Ukraine	Oleksiy Danilov	National Security and Defense Council Secretary
Ukraine	Dmytro Yarosh	Former leader of "Right sector"
Ukraine	Oleksii Poroshenko	Petro Poroshenko's Son
Ukraine	Emine Dzhaparova	First Deputy Minister for Foreign Affairs of Ukraine
Ukraine	Valentyn Nalyvaichenko	Member of the Verkhovna Rada, former Head of the Security Service of Ukraine
Ukraine	Denys Monastyrsky (d. 2023)	Former Minister of Internal Affairs, Died in a helicopter crash on 18 January 2023.
Ukraine	Ivanna Klympush-Tsintsadze	Former vice Prime Minister of Ukraine on matters of European integration
Ukraine	Olha Stefanishyna	Deputy Prime Minister for European and Euro-Atlantic Integration
Ukraine	Olena Zerkal	Former Deputy Minister of Foreign Affairs for the European Integration
Ukraine	Solomiia Bobrovska	People's Deputy of Ukraine
Ukraine	Stepan Ivakhiv	People's Deputy of Ukraine, co-owner of the Continuum FIG and the WOG gas station network
Ukraine	Volodymyr Borodiansky	Former StarLightMedia CEO
Ukraine	Anatoliy Petrenko	Deputy Minister of Defence of Ukraine for European Integration
Ukraine	Yuriy Ryzhenkov	Metinvest CEO
Ukraine	Yevgeniy Yermakov	Co-owner of ATB
Ukraine	Roman Chihir	Owner of the Fozzy Group, one of the largest commercial and industrial groups in Ukraine
Ukraine	Volodymyr Kostelman	President of the Fozzy Group
Ukraine	Filya Zhebrovska	Chairwoman of the supervisory board of the Farmak
Ukraine	Farmak	Ukrainian pharmaceutical market leader based on the sales of medicinal products in monetary terms (according to Proxima Research in 2022)
Ukraine	Darnitsa (company)	Ukrainian pharmaceutical company
Ukraine	PrJSC MHP	Leading international food & agrotech company with headquarters in Ukraine
Ukraine	Ferrexpo	Third largest exporter of iron ore pellets in the world
Ukraine	Ukroboronprom	Association of multi-product enterprises (conglomerate or concern) in various sectors of the defence industry of Ukraine
Ukraine	Ukrspecexport	State-owned arms trading company and part of the state conglomerate Ukrainian Defense Industry
Ukraine	State Export-Import Bank of Ukraine	One of three 100% state-owned systemically important banks in Ukraine (together with Savings Bank and PrivatBank)
Ukraine	Centrenergo	Major electric and thermal energy producing company in central Ukraine and eastern Ukraine
Ukraine	TAS Insurance Group PJSC	Universal insurer
Ukraine	TEP-Vertical LLC	Freight forwarding company
Ukraine	First Logistic Company	Freight forwarding company
Ukraine	KrAZ	Automobile company
Ukraine	Kharkiv Tractor Plant	Agricultural machinery company
Ukraine	Galnaftogaz	Ukrainian chain of gas stations
Ukraine	Starlight Media	Largest Ukrainian broadcasting group
Ukraine	Pavel Fuks	Oligarch
Ukraine	Glib Zagoriy	Former People's Deputy of Ukraine, co-owner of the PrJSC Pharmaceutical company "Darnitsa"
Ukraine	Volodymyr Zagoriy	Founder of the PrJSC Pharmaceutical company "Darnitsa", Father of Glib Zagoriy
Ukraine	Iryna Podoliak	People's Deputy of Ukraine
Ukraine	Lesia Vasylenko	People's Deputy of Ukraine
Ukraine	Maksym Buzhanskyi	People's Deputy of Ukraine
Ukraine	Roman Matsola	People's Deputy of Ukraine, Owner of First Private Brewery
Ukraine	Vadym Novynskyi	Businessman, priest and former politician
Ukraine	Oleksandr Vilkul	Businessman, Head of the Ukrainian Military Administration of Kryvyi Rih.Former Vice Prime Minister of Ukraine and Governor of Dnipropetrovsk Oblast.
Ukraine	Mykhailo Dobkin	Former governor of Kharkiv Oblast, former mayor of Kharkiv
Ukraine	Yevhen Murayev	Leader of the political party Nashi
Ukraine	Ukrspecexport	State-owned arms trading company and part of the state conglomerate Ukrainian Defense Industry
Ukraine	Ukrspirt	State producer and operator of the Ukrainian ethyl alcohol
Ukraine	Centrenergo	Major electric and thermal energy producing company in central and eastern Ukraine
Ukraine	Oleksii Bilyi	Ukrainian industrialist and politician, general director of the Mariupol metallurgical plant " Azovstal " until 2006
Ukraine	Yaroslav Yurchyshyn	People's Deputy of Ukraine
Ukraine	Serhiy Rakhmanin	People's Deputy of Ukraine
Ukraine	Oleksandr Kachura	People's Deputy of Ukraine
Ukraine	Olha Vasylevska-Smahlyuk	People's Deputy of Ukraine
Ukraine	Andriy Herus	People's Deputy of Ukraine
Ukraine	Mykhaylo Makarenko	People's Deputy of Ukraine
Ukraine	Oleksandr Merezhko	People's Deputy of Ukraine, Chairman of the Foreign Affairs Committee
Ukraine	Ihor Shurma	People's Deputy of Ukraine
Ukraine	Inna Sovsun	People's Deputy of Ukraine
Ukraine	Nina Yuzhanina	People's Deputy of Ukraine
Ukraine	Yurii Shukhevych	Far-right politician, member of the Ukrainian Helsinki Group, political prisoner, son of Roman Shukhevych
Ukraine	Serhiy Vlasenko	Politician and Lawyer
Ukraine	Iryna Friz	1st Minister for Veterans Affairs
Ukraine	Andriy Parubiy	Former chairman of the Verkhovna Rada
Ukraine	Yuriy Lutsenko	Former Prosecutor General
Ukraine	DniproAzot	One of the oldest companies in the Ukrainian chemical industry
Ukraine	Azot	One of the biggest manufacturers of nitrogen fertilizers in Ukraine
Ukraine	Andriy Verevskyi	Founder and chairman of the board of Kernel
Ukraine	Kernel	World's No. 1 sunflower oil producer
Ukraine	Oleksiy Pertin	CEO of Smart Holding
Ukraine	MHP	Largest producer and exporter of chicken in Ukraine
Ukraine	Mykhailo Havryliuk	Former People's Deputy of Ukraine and Cossack of the Fourth Maidan Self-Defense Hundred
Ukraine	Iryna Farion	Former People's Deputy of Ukraine and member of Svoboda
Ukraine	Izet Hdanov	Former Ukraine Presidential representative in Crimea
Ukraine	Borys Babin	Former acting Ukraine Presidential representative in Crimea
Ukraine	Iryna Herashchenko	People's Deputy of Ukraine and former president's Humanitarian Envoy at the Minsk peace talks
Ukraine	Sofiia Fedyna	People's Deputy of Ukraine
Ukraine	Mykhailo Volynets	People's Deputy of Ukraine
Ukraine	Oleksandr Yurchenko	People's Deputy of Ukraine
Ukraine	Viktoriya Hryb	People's Deputy of Ukraine
Ukraine	Anna Skorokhod	People's Deputy of Ukraine
Ukraine	Daria Volodina	People's Deputy of Ukraine
Ukraine	Anastasiya Radina	People's Deputy of Ukraine
Ukraine	Maria Mezentseva	People's Deputy of Ukraine
Ukraine	Tetiana Ostrikova	People's Deputy of Ukraine
Ukraine	Olha Koval	People's Deputy of Ukraine
Ukraine	Oksana Dmytriyeva	People's Deputy of Ukraine
Ukraine	Oksana Anatoliivna Hrynchuk	People's Deputy of Ukraine
Ukraine	Olena Kopanchuk	People's Deputy of Ukraine
Ukraine	Olha Saladukha	People's Deputy of Ukraine, former triple jumper
Ukraine	Maryna Bardina	People's Deputy of Ukraine
Ukraine	Anna Purtova	People's Deputy of Ukraine
Ukraine	Iryna Allakhverdieva	People's Deputy of Ukraine
Ukraine	Larysa Bilozir	People's Deputy of Ukraine
Ukraine	Oleh Barna	Former People's Deputy of Ukraine
Ukraine	Petro Yurchyshyn	People's Deputy of Ukraine
Ukraine	Anton Herashchenko	Former People's Deputy of Ukraine, current official advisor and a former deputy minister at the Ukrainian Ministry of Internal Affairs
Ukraine	Taras Yuryk	People's Deputy of Ukraine
Ukraine	Vitaly Portnikov	Journalist
Ukraine	Serhiy Leshchenko	Journalist, former People's Deputy of Ukraine
Ukraine	Mustafa Nayyem	Former People's Deputy of Ukraine, Journalist
Ukraine	Yehor Benkendorf	CEO of 112 Ukraine
Ukraine	Kostyantyn Hrygoryshyn	Owner of Zaporozhtransformator
Ukraine	Synkiv-Agro	Agricultural enterprise in the Ternopil region specializes in growing tomatoes
Ukraine	Oleksandr Tkachenko	Minister of Culture and Information Policy, media manager, journalist, producer and the long-term CEO of the 1+1 Media Group
Ukraine	Volodymyr Viatrovych	People's Deputy of Ukraine, Director of the Ukrainian Institute of National Remembrance
Ukraine	Oksana Bilozir	Former People's Deputy of Ukraine
Ukraine	Maksym Burbak	Former Minister of Infrastructure of Ukraine
Ukraine	Oleksiy Vadaturskyi (d. 2022)	Agricultural and grain logistics businessman and the founder of Nibulon, Killed with his wife in the early hours of 31 July 2022 by Russian missile strikes on the city of Mykolaiv.
Ukraine	Yuriy Bereza	Former People's Deputy of Ukraine and commander of the Dnipro Battalion
Ukraine	Gennadiy Bogolyubov	Businessman that controls Privat Group, along with Ihor Kolomoyskyi and Oleksiy Martynov
Ukraine	Oleksandr Abdullin	Journalist and People's Deputy of Ukraine
Ukraine	Vitaliy Antonov	Entrepreneur from Western Ukraine the founder of OKKO Group
Ukraine	Arsen Avakov	Former Minister of Internal Affairs of Ukraine
Ukraine	Vasyl Hrytsak	Former Head of the Security Service of Ukraine
Ukraine	Mustafa Dzhemilev	Former chairman of the Mejlis of the Crimean Tatar People
Ukraine	Mykhailo Zabrodskyi	Former commander of the Ukrainian Airmobile Forces
Ukraine	Stepan Kubiv	Former First Deputy Prime Minister
Ukraine	Iryna Lutsenko	Wife of former General Prosecutor Ihor Lutsenko
Ukraine	Serhiy Taruta	Member of the Verkhonva Rada, former governor of Donetsk Oblast
Ukraine	Serhiy Rybalka	Former People's Deputy of Ukraine
Ukraine	Oleksandra Kuzhel	People's Deputy of Ukraine
Ukraine	Alyona Shkrum	People's Deputy of Ukraine
Ukraine	Volodymyr Ariev	Chairman of Ukrainian delegation to PACE
Ukraine	Serhiy Knyazev	2nd Chief of National Police of Ukraine
Ukraine	Volodymyr Omelyan	Ex-Minister of Infrastructure
Ukraine	Volodymyr Parasyuk	Former People's Deputy of Ukraine
Ukraine	Yuriy Stets	Ex-Minister of Information Policy
Ukraine	Ostap Semerak	Ex-Minister of Ecology
Ukraine	Anatolii Matios	Ex-Chief Military Prosecutor
Ukraine	Boris Lozhkin	Media-tycoon, former chief of staff of president
Ukraine	Mykola Rudkovsky	Ex-Minister of Transport and Communications
Ukraine	Liliya Hrynevych	Ex-Minister of Education and Science
Ukraine	Oleksandr Hranovskyi	Shareholder at Vertex United, Oligarch
Ukraine	Hennadiy Korban	Former Deputy Governor of Dnipropetrovsk Oblast, Oligarch, patron of the Jewish community in Dnipro
Ukraine	Oles Dovgiy	People's Deputy of Ukraine, Oligarch
Ukraine	Andriy Biletsky	Far-right politician, leader of political party National Corps. He was the first commander of the volunteer militia Azov Battalion
Ukraine	Semen Semenchenko	People's Deputy of Ukraine, commander-founder of the volunteer territorial defence battalion "Donbas"
Ukraine	Igor Kononenko	First deputy chairman of the Bloc "Solidarity" and a close friend of Petro Poroshenko.
Ukraine	Artur Herasymov	Head of Petro Poroshenko Bloc
Ukraine	Ihor Hrynyov	Member of Petro Poroshenko Bloc
Ukraine	Ivan Fursin	Dmytro Firtash's partner
Ukraine	Volodymyr Lokotko	CEO of Starlight Production
Ukraine	Vyacheslav Abroskin	Former First Deputy Director-General of the National Police
Ukraine	Volodymyr Borodyansky	Head of Starlight STB
Ukraine	Oleksandr Bogutsky	Head of ICTV
Ukraine	Yana Zinkevych	People's Deputy of Ukraine
Ukraine	Ahtem Chiygoz	People's Deputy of Ukraine
Ukraine	Dmytro Razumkov	Speaker of the Verkhovna
Ukraine	Ruslan Stefanchuk	Chairman of the Verkhovna Rada of Ukraine
Ukraine	Yelyzaveta Yasko	Head of the Ukrainian delegation to the PACE
Ukraine	Kira Rudik	People's Deputy
Ukraine	Svyatoslav Vakarchuk	Former Voice party leader
Ukraine	Vyacheslav Kyrylenko	Former Minister of Labor and Social Policy and Vice Prime Minister
Ukraine	Petro Poroshenko	Former president of Ukraine
Ukraine	George Tuka	Former governor of Luhansk Oblast
Ukraine	Stepan Poltorak	Former Minister of Defense of Ukraine
Ukraine	Andriy Kobolyev	Oligarch, CEO of Naftogaz
Ukraine	Mykola Zlochevsky	Oligarch, owner of Burisma
Ukraine	Vasyl Hrytsak	Former head of SBU
Ukraine	Ulana Suprun	Ukrainian-American physician, activist, and philanthropist who served as the acting Minister of Healthcare from 2016 to 2019
Ukraine	Victor Pinchuk	Oligarch, owner of Interpipe
Ukraine	Oleksandr Hereha	Member of the Verkhovna Rada, Oligarch, owner of Epicentr K
Ukraine	Halyna Hereha	Oligarch, owner of Epicentr K
Ukraine	Leonid Chernovetskyi	Oligarch, owner of Pravex Group, former mayor of Kyiv
Ukraine	Borys Kolesnikov	Oligarch, owner of Konti/APK-Invest
Ukraine	Konstantin Grigorishin	Russian-Ukrainian oligarch, owner of Energy Standard Group
Ukraine	Yuriy Kosiuk	Oligarch, CEO of MHP
Ukraine	Kostyantyn Zhevago	Oligarch in banking, vehicle manufacturing, iron ore mining
Ukraine	Oleksandr Yaroslavskyi	Oligarch in real estate and metallurgy, former co-owner of UkrSibbank and president of FC Metalist Kharkiv (2005–2012)
Ukraine	Rinat Akhmetov	Founder and president of System Capital Management (SCM), and ranked as the wealthiest man in Ukraine
Ukraine	Igor Kolomoisky	Second or third richest person in Ukraine (after Rinat Akhmetov and/or Viktor Pinchuk) and is seen as one of the most influential oligarchs
Ukraine	Volodymyr Fesenko	Political analyst
Ukraine	Yevhen Vasylyovych Karas	Leader of the far-right organization C14
Ukraine	Yuriy Onishchenko	Former First assistant to the president
Ukraine	Konstantin Yeliseyev	Former Deputy Head of the Presidential Administration
Ukraine	Vladimir Galanternik	Businessman
Ukraine	Yuriy Schumacher	Businessman
Ukraine	Leonyd Yurushev	Millionaire, owner of the Dneprowagonremstroy passenger railway wagons construction plant
Ukraine	Arseniy Yatsenyuk	Former prime minister of Ukraine
Ukraine	Oksana Syroyid	Party leader of Self Reliance, Director of the Ukrainian Legal Foundation sponsored by George Soros
Ukraine	Oleh Tyahnybok	Far-right activist who is leader of the Ukrainian nationalist Svoboda political party
Ukraine	Yulia Tymoshenko	Former prime minister of Ukraine
Ukraine	Svitlana Zalishchuk	Advisor to the CEO of Naftogaz and ex-advisor to the prime minister of Ukraine
Ukraine	Sumykhimprom	Chemical industry plant based in Sumy
Ukraine	Gennadiy Trukhanov	Mayor of Odesa
Ukraine	Serhiy Hrynevetsky	Former governor of Odesa Oblast
Ukraine	Yuriy Koryavchenkov	Actor
Ukraine	Valerii Patskan	Audit Chamber chief
Ukraine	Valentyn Reznichenko	Former governor of Dnipropetrovsk Oblast
Ukraine	Borys Filatov	Mayor of Dnipro
Ukraine	Oleksandr Dubinsky	People's Deputy
Ukraine	Nadiya Savchenko	Ex-People's Deputy
Ukraine	Oleksiy Honcharenko	People's Deputy
Ukraine	Anton Kisse	People's Deputy
Ukraine	Yuriy Miroshnichenko	People's Deputy
Ukraine	Yuriy Levchenko	People's Deputy
Ukraine	Oleksiy Martynov	Co-owner of Privat Group
Ukraine	Mykola Kuleba	Children's Ombudsman
Ukraine	Vitaliy Kupriy	People's Deputy
Ukraine	Heo Leros	People's Deputy
Ukraine	Oleksiy Martynov	Millionaire, former Privat Group partner
Ukraine	Lyudmila Denisova	Verkhovna Rada's Human Rights Ombudsperson
United Kingdom	Boris Johnson	Former prime minister of the United Kingdom
United Kingdom	Liz Truss	Former prime minister of the United Kingdom and former Foreign Secretary
United Kingdom	Ben Wallace	Secretary of State of Defence
United Kingdom	Dominic Raab	Deputy Prime Minister, Lord Chancellor, and Secretary of State for Justice
United Kingdom	Grant Shapps	Secretary of State for Transport
United Kingdom	James Cleverly	Foreign Secretary
United Kingdom	Michael Gove	Secretary of State for Levelling Up, Housing and Communities
United Kingdom	Nadhim Zahawi	Minister Without Portfolio
United Kingdom	Oliver Dowden	Chancellor of the Duchy of Lancaster
United Kingdom	Patrick Sanders	Chief of General Staff
United Kingdom	George Eustice	Secretary of State for Environment, Food and Rural Affairs
United Kingdom	Alister Jack	Secretary of State for Scotland
United Kingdom	Chris Heaton-Harris	Chief Whip of the House of Commons, Parliamentary Secretary to the Treasury
United Kingdom	Alan Campbell	Chief Whip of Labour Party
United Kingdom	Keir Starmer	Leader of Labour Party
United Kingdom	David Lammy	Shadow Minister for Foreign Affairs of Great Britain
United Kingdom	Lisa Nandy	Shadow Minister for Social and Economic Development of Regions and Housing
United Kingdom	Nick Thomas-Symonds	Shadow Secretary of State for International Trade of the United Kingdom
United Kingdom	Neil Gray	Minister for Culture, Europe and International Development
United Kingdom	Wendy Morton	Deputy Minister for Transport
United Kingdom	Donald Wilson	Councillor and Past Lord Provost of the City of Edinburgh
United Kingdom	Diane Abbott	Labour MP
United Kingdom	Kevin Brennan	Labour MP
United Kingdom	Karen Buck	Labour MP
United Kingdom	Richard Burgon	Labour MP
United Kingdom	Dawn Butler	Labour MP
United Kingdom	Theresa May	Former prime minister of the United Kingdom
United Kingdom	David Cameron	Former prime minister of the United Kingdom
United Kingdom	Jeremy Hunt	Former Secretary of State for Foreign and Commonwealth Affairs
United Kingdom	David Davis	Former Secretary of State for Exiting the European Union
United Kingdom	Justine Greening	Former Secretary of Education
United Kingdom	Oliver Letwin	Former Shadow Chancellor of the Exchequer
United Kingdom	Jo Johnson	Former Minister of State for Universities, Science, Research and Innovation
United Kingdom	Jacob Rees-Mogg	Minister of State for Brexit Opportunities and Government Efficiency
United Kingdom	Mark Spencer	Leader of the House of Commons, Lord President of the Council
United Kingdom	Lindsay Hoyle	Speaker of the House of Commons
United Kingdom	Richard Sharp	Chairman of the BBC Board of Governors
United Kingdom	Alexander Thomson	Chief correspondent and presenter of Channel 4 News
United Kingdom	Dan Rivers	Correspondent of ITV News
United Kingdom	Sophy Ridge	Journalist and presenter of Sky News
United Kingdom	John Ryley	Head of Sky News
United Kingdom	Jonathan Charles Munro	Head of BBC News
United Kingdom	Alef Bank	Small Moscow credit institution focused primarily on lending to legal entities, attracting household funds in deposits, and also operations on the securities market, including in the framework of attracting liquidity from repurchase transactions.In 2002, the British Eastlink Lanker Plc became the sole shareholder of the bank.
United Kingdom	Mark Galeotti	Columnist of The Moscow Times
United Kingdom	Lawrence Freedman	Columnist of The Sunday Times
United Kingdom	Gideon Rachman	Columnist of The Financial Times
United Kingdom	Jerome Donald Starkey	Military Columnist of The Sun
United Kingdom	Edward William Robert Carr	Associate editor of The Economist
United Kingdom	Katharine Viner	Editor-in-Chief of The Guardian
United Kingdom	John Witherow	Editor-in-Chief of The Times
United Kingdom	Con Coughlin	Editor-in-Chief of The Daily Telegraph
United Kingdom	Edward Verity	Editor-in-Chief of The Daily Mail
United Kingdom	Christian Broughton	Editor-in-Chief of The Independent
United Kingdom	Caroline Wheeler	Political Editor of The Sunday Times
United Kingdom	Huw Walters	Head of Economic Security at the UK Department of Defense
United Kingdom	Amanda Milling	Minister of State for Asia and the Middle East
United Kingdom	Roger Carr	Chairman of BAE Systems
United Kingdom	Alexander Cresswell	Chairman of Board of Directors and CEO of Thales UK
United Kingdom	Charles Stickland	Chief of Joint Operations, UK Armed Force
United Kingdom	Michael Wigston	Chief of the Air Staff
United Kingdom	Leo Docherty	Parliamentary Under-Secretary of State for Defence, People and Veterans
United Kingdom	Ben Key	Fleet Commander, Chief of Staff of the Royal Navy
United Kingdom	Jeremy Quin	Minister of State for Defence Procurement
United Kingdom	Patrick McLoughlin	Former chairman of the Conservative Party
United Kingdom	Damian Green	Former First Secretary of State
United Kingdom	Sarah Wollaston	Former Liberal Democratic MP
United Kingdom	David Tredinnick	Former Conservative MP
United Kingdom	Stephen Mecalfe	Conservative MP
United Kingdom	Liam Fox	Conservative MP
United Kingdom	Peter Dowd	Labour MP
United Kingdom	Rosie Duffield	Labour MP
United Kingdom	Janet Daby	Labour MP
United Kingdom	John Grogan	Conservative MP
United Kingdom	Louise Haigh	Labour MP
United Kingdom	John Attlee, 3rd Earl Attlee	Former Lord-in-waiting, Government Whip, grandson of Clement Attlee
United Kingdom	David Freud, Baron Freud	Former Minister for Welfare Reform, great-grandson of Sigmund Freud
United Kingdom	Sheila Noakes, Baroness Noakes	Member of House of Lords
United Kingdom	Lucy Neville-Rolfe	Member of House of Lords
United Kingdom	Mark Schreiber, Baron Marlesford	Member of House of Lords
United Kingdom	James Lupton, Baron Lupton	Member of House of Lords
United Kingdom	Alexander Scrymgeour, 12th Earl of Dundee	Member of House of Lords
United Kingdom	John Eccles, 2nd Viscount Eccles	Member of House of Lords
United Kingdom	Michael Bates, Baron Bates	Member of House of Lords
United Kingdom	Jonathan Caine, Baron Caine	Parliamentary Under-Secretary of State for Northern Ireland, Member of House of Lords
United Kingdom	Arthur Gore, 9th Earl of Arran	Former Parliamentary Under-Secretary of State for Northern Ireland, Member of House of Lords
United Kingdom	Kenneth Baker, Baron Baker of Dorking	Former Chancellor of the Duchy of Lancaster and Chairman of Conservative Party, Member of House of Lords
United Kingdom	Diana Eccles, Viscountess Eccles	Member of House of Lords
United Kingdom	Deborah Stedman-Scott, Baroness Stedman-Scott	Member of House of Lords, Parliamentary Under-Secretary of State for Women
United Kingdom	Ros Altmann	Member of House of Lords
United Kingdom	James Arbuthnot	Member of House of Lords
United Kingdom	Elizabeth Berridge, Baroness Berridge	Member of House of Lords
United Kingdom	David Maclean	Member of House of Lords
United Kingdom	Charles Cathcart, 7th Earl Cathcart	Member of House of Lords
United Kingdom	Carlyn Chisholm, Baroness Chisholm of Owlpen	Member of House of Lords
United Kingdom	Philippa Roe, Baroness Couttie	Member of House of Lords
United Kingdom	Robert Dixon-Smith, Baron Dixon-Smith	Member of House of Lords
United Kingdom	Michael Farmer, Baron Farmer	Member of House of Lords
United Kingdom	Howard Flight	Member of House of Lords
United Kingdom	Simone Finn, Baroness Finn	Former Downing Street Chief of Staff
United Kingdom	Edward Faulks, Baron Faulks	Member of House of Lords
United Kingdom	Stanley Fink, Baron Fink	Member of House of Lords
United Kingdom	Alistair Cooke, Baron Lexden	Deputy Speaker of the House of Lords, official historian and archivist of the Conservative Party and Carlton Club
United Kingdom	Peter Lilley	Member of House of Lords
United Kingdom	Nick Paton Walsh	CNN's International Security Editor
United Kingdom	Giles Goschen, 4th Viscount Goschen	Member of House of Lords
United Kingdom	Robert Hayward, Baron Hayward	Member of House of Lords
United Kingdom	Ian Lang, Baron Lang of Monkton	Former Member of House of Lords
United Kingdom	James Mackay, Baron Mackay of Clashfern	Former Member of House of Lords
United Kingdom	Benjamin Mancroft, 3rd Baron Mancroft	Member of House of Lords
United Kingdom	Zahida Manzoor	Member of House of Lords
United Kingdom	Gary Porter, Baron Porter of Spalding	Member of House of Lords
United Kingdom	John Randall, Baron Randall of Uxbridge	Member of House of Lords
United Kingdom	Gillian Shephard	Member of House of Lords, Chairman of the Association of Conservative Peers
United Kingdom	Stephen Sherbourne	Member of House of Lords, non-executive director of Smithfields Consultants
United Kingdom	Kevin Shinkwin, Baron Shinkwin	Member of House of Lords
United Kingdom	Laura Wyld, Baroness Wyld	Member of House of Lords
United Kingdom	Gordon Wasserman, Baron Wasserman	Member of House of Lords
United Kingdom	John Wakeham	Member of House of Lords, Director of Enron
United Kingdom	Nicholas True, Baron True	Leader of the House of Lords, Lord Keeper of the Privy Seal, former Minister of State at the Cabinet Office
United Kingdom	Mike Whitby	Member of House of Lords, former leader of Birmingham City Council
United Kingdom	James Younger, 5th Viscount Younger of Leckie	Member of House of Lords, Lord-in-waiting, Government Whip
United Kingdom	Susan Williams, Baroness Williams of Trafford	Member of House of Lords, Chief Whip of the House of Lords, Captain of the Honourable Corps of Gentlemen-at-Arms, former Minister of State for Home Affairs
United Kingdom	John Taylor, Baron Taylor of Holbeach	Member of House of Lords
United Kingdom	David Trimble	Member of House of Lords, 1st First Minister of Northern Ireland
United Kingdom	Liz Sugg, Baroness Sugg	Member of House of Lords
United Kingdom	Ranbir Singh Suri, Baron Suri	Member of House of Lords
United Kingdom	Liz Redfern, Baroness Redfern	Member of House of Lords
United Kingdom	Joan Seccombe, Baroness Seccombe	Member of House of Lords
United Kingdom	Ray Collins, Baron Collins of Highbury	Member of House of Lords
United Kingdom	Norman Davies	Historian, Honorary fellow at St Antony's College, Oxford
United Kingdom	Timothy Garton Ash	Historian, Professor of European Studies at Oxford University
United Kingdom	Orlando Figes	Historian, Professor of University of Cambridge
United Kingdom	David Abulafia	Historian, Professor of History at Birkbeck College, University of London
United Kingdom	Graeme Robertson	Professor of Political Science and Director of the Center for Slavic, Eurasian and East European Studies at the University of North Carolina
United Kingdom	James Gregory Sherr	International Centre for Defence and Security (Estonia)
United Kingdom	James Calder Walton	Assistant Director of the Harvard Belfer Center's Applied History Project and Intelligence Project.
United Kingdom	Michael Ashcroft	Member of House of Lords
United Kingdom	Mohamed Sheikh, Baron Sheikh	Member of House of Lords, founder of Conservative Muslim Forum
United Kingdom	Daniel Hannan	Adviser to the UK Board of Trade
United Kingdom	James Cartlidge	Minister of State for Defence Procurement
United Kingdom	Simon Asquith	Director of Submarines
United Kingdom	Stuart Peach	Prime Minister's Special Envoy to the Western Balkans
United Kingdom	Roland Walker	Deputy Chief of the Defence Staff (Military Strategy and Operations)
United Kingdom	Timothy David Neal-Hopes	Commander of the National Cyber Force
United Kingdom	Fiona Shackleton	Member of House of Lords, solicitor for members of the British royal family and celebrities, including Sir Paul McCartney, Prince Andrew, Duke of York, Charles, Prince of Wales, and Princess Haya bint Hussein
United Kingdom	Andrew Robathan	Member of House of Lords
United Kingdom	Amanda Sater, Baroness Sater	Member of House of Lords
United Kingdom	Kate Rock, Baroness Rock	Member of House of Lords, Formerly Vice-chairman of the Conservative Party with special responsibility for business engagement
United Kingdom	Richard Spring, Baron Risby	Member of House of Lords, Prime Ministerial Trade Envoy to Algeria
United Kingdom	Bernard Ribeiro, Baron Ribeiro	Member of House of Lords, Chancellor of Anglia Ruskin University
United Kingdom	Dolar Popat	Member of House of Lords
United Kingdom	Stuart Polak, Baron Polak	Member of House of Lords
United Kingdom	Emma Pidding, Baroness Pidding	Member of House of Lords, President of the Northern Ireland Conservatives
United Kingdom	Michelle Mone, Baroness Mone	Member of House of Lords, Founder of MJM International Ltd and the lingerie company Ultimo
United Kingdom	Eric Pickles	Member of House of Lords, Chairman of Conservative Friends of Israel in the House of Lords, Special Envoy for Post-Holocaust Issues
United Kingdom	Mark McInnes, Baron McInnes of Kilwinning	Member of House of Lords
United Kingdom	Jonathan Marland, Baron Marland	Member of House of Lords, Chairman of the Commonwealth Enterprise and Investment Council
United Kingdom	Norman Lamont	Member of House of Lords
United Kingdom	Timothy Kirkhope	Member of House of Lords
United Kingdom	Graham Kirkham, Baron Kirkham	Member of House of Lords, founder and chairman of sofa retailer DFS, Owner of Whitby Chain
United Kingdom	Tom King, Baron King of Bridgwater	Member of House of Lords
United Kingdom	Richard Keen, Baron Keen of Elie	Member of House of Lords, former Leader of Scottish Conservative Party
United Kingdom	David Hunt, Baron Hunt of Wirral	Member of House of Lords
United Kingdom	Michael Jopling	Member of House of Lords
United Kingdom	David Howell, Baron Howell of Guildford	Member of House of Lords
United Kingdom	Michael Howard	Member of House of Lords, former leader of the Conservative Party
United Kingdom	John Horam	Member of House of Lords
United Kingdom	Gloria Hooper, Baroness Hooper	Member of House of Lords
United Kingdom	Chris Holmes, Baron Holmes of Richmond	Member of House of Lords, Director of Paralympic Integration for the London Olympics
United Kingdom	Karim Ahmad Khan	"Prosecutor of the International Criminal Court"
United Kingdom	Jonathan Hill, Baron Hill of Oareford	Member of House of Lords, former European Commissioner for Financial Stability, Financial Services and Capital Markets Union, Leader of the House of Lords and Chancellor of the Duchy of Lancaster
United Kingdom	Brian Griffiths, Baron Griffiths of Fforestfach	Member of House of Lords, Margaret Thatcher's chief policy adviser
United Kingdom	Michael Grade	Chairman of Ofcom
United Kingdom	Stephen Gilbert, Baron Gilbert of Panteg	Member of House of Lords, former chair of the Communications and Digital Committee
United Kingdom	Patrick Stopford, 9th Earl of Courtown	Deputy Chief Whip of the House of Lords, Captain of the Queen's Bodyguard of the Yeomen of the Guard
United Kingdom	Malcolm Sinclair, 20th Earl of Caithness	Member of House of Lords,20th Lord Berriedale, 15th Baronet, of Canisbay, Co. Caithness, and chief of Clan Sinclair
United Kingdom	Nick Bourne	Member of House of Lords
United Kingdom	Michael Brougham, 5th Baron Brougham and Vaux	Member of House of Lords
United Kingdom	Angela Browning	Member of House of Lords
United Kingdom	Peta Buscombe, Baroness Buscombe	Member of House of Lords
United Kingdom	George Bridges, Baron Bridges of Headley	Chair of the Economic Affairs Committee
United Kingdom	Karren Brady	Member of House of Lords
United Kingdom	Ian Livingston, Baron Livingston of Parkhead	Member of House of Lords
United Kingdom	Edward Foljambe, 5th Earl of Liverpool	Member of House of Lords
United Kingdom	Paul Strasburger, Baron Strasburger	Member of House of Lords
United Kingdom	Margaret Eaton, Baroness Eaton	Member of House of Lords
United Kingdom	Alan Haselhurst, Baron Haselhurst	Member of House of Lords
United Kingdom	Alastair Goodlad	Member of House of Lords
United Kingdom	Nicholas Fairfax, 14th Lord Fairfax of Cameron	Member of House of Lords
United Kingdom	Michael Forsyth, Baron Forsyth of Drumlean	Chairman of the Association of Conservative Peers, chairman of the Board of Directors of Secure Trust Bank, Member of House of Lords
United Kingdom	Rupert Ponsonby, 7th Baron de Mauley	Master of the Horse
United Kingdom	Jamie Borwick, 5th Baron Borwick	Member of House of Lords
United Kingdom	Ivon Moore-Brabazon, 3rd Baron Brabazon of Tara	Member of House of Lords
United Kingdom	James Lindesay-Bethune, 16th Earl of Lindsay	Member of House of Lords, Patroness of the Royal Caledonian Ball and a master of the Fife Foxhounds
United Kingdom	Catherine Fall, Baroness Fall	Former Deputy Chief of Staff
United Kingdom	Stephen Green, Baron Green of Hurstpierpoint	Member of House of Lords, former chairman of HSBC
United Kingdom	Howard Leigh, Baron Leigh of Hurley	Member of House of Lords
United Kingdom	Robert Balchin, Baron Lingfield	Member of House of Lords, Freeman of the City of London, Liveryman of the Goldsmiths', Broderers', and Apothecaries' companies
United Kingdom	Carolyn Harris	Conservative MP
United Kingdom	Barry Gardiner	Conservative MP
United Kingdom	Chris Elmore	Conservative MP
United Kingdom	Ruth George	Conservative MP
United Kingdom	Harriett Baldwin	Conservative MP
United Kingdom	James Berry	Conservative MP
United Kingdom	Sue Hayman	Conservative MP
United Kingdom	Peter Aldous	Conservative MP
United Kingdom	Stuart Andrew	Conservative MP
United Kingdom	Kemi Badenoch	Conservative MP
United Kingdom	Richard Bacon	Conservative MP
United Kingdom	Victoria Atkins	Conservative MP
United Kingdom	James Gray	Conservative MP
United Kingdom	John Baron	Conservative MP
United Kingdom	Steve Baker	Conservative MP
United Kingdom	Sharon Hodgson	Conservative MP
United Kingdom	Ben Everitt	Conservative MP
United Kingdom	Daniel Kawczynski	Conservative MP
United Kingdom	Andrea Leadsom	Conservative MP
United Kingdom	Theresa Villiers	Conservative MP
United Kingdom	Nus Ghani	Conservative MP
United Kingdom	Tim Loughton	Conservative MP
United Kingdom	John Astor, 3rd Baron Astor of Hever	Conservative MP
United Kingdom	John McFall, Baron McFall of Alcluith	Lord Speaker
United Kingdom	John Gardiner, Baron Gardiner of Kimble	Senior Deputy Lord Speaker
United Kingdom	Frederick Curzon, 7th Earl Howe	Deputy Leader
United Kingdom	Euan Geddes, 3rd Baron Geddes	Senior Deputy Lord Speaker
United Kingdom	Helen Newlove, Baroness Newlove	Senior Deputy Lord Speaker
United Kingdom	Catherine Meyer, Baroness Meyer	Member of House of Lords of the United Kingdom
United Kingdom	Charles Wellesley, 9th Duke of Wellington	9th Duke of Wellington
United Kingdom	George Young, Baron Young of Cookham	Senior Deputy Lord Speaker
United Kingdom	Oliver Eden, 8th Baron Henley	Former Lord-in-waiting, Government Whip
United Kingdom	Nicholas Lowther, 2nd Viscount Ullswater	Former Lord-in-waiting, Government Whip, Private Secretary to Princess Margaret, Countess of Snowdon
United Kingdom	Charlotte Vere, Baroness Vere of Norbiton	Parliamentary Under-Secretary of State for Transport
United Kingdom	Diana Barran, Baroness Barran	Parliamentary Under-Secretary of State for School System
United Kingdom	Olivia Bloomfield, Baroness Bloomfield of Hinton Waldrist	Baroness-in-Waiting, Government Whip
United Kingdom	Jane Scott, Baroness Scott of Bybrook	Baroness-in-Waiting, Government Whip
United Kingdom	Patricia Morris, Baroness Morris of Bolton	Senior Deputy Lord Speaker
United Kingdom	Ian Duncan, Baron Duncan of Springbank	Senior Deputy Lord Speaker
United Kingdom	Janet Evelyn Fookes, Baroness Fookes	Senior Deputy Lord Speaker
United Kingdom	Thomas Galbraith, 2nd Baron Strathclyde	Former Leader of the House of Lords, Chancellor of the Duchy of Lancaster
United Kingdom	Joyce Anelay, Baroness Anelay of St Johns	Former Government Chief Whip in the House of Lords
United Kingdom	Henry Ashton, 4th Baron Ashton of Hyde	Government Chief Whip in the House of Lords
United Kingdom	Natalie Evans, Baroness Evans of Bowes Park	Leader of the House of Lords
United Kingdom	Pauline Neville-Jones, Baroness Neville-Jones	Former Minister of State for Security and Counter Terrorism
United Kingdom	George Robertson, Baron Robertson of Port Ellen	10th Secretary General of NATO
United Kingdom	Peter Ricketts	First national security adviser
United Kingdom	Alex Cole-Hamilton	Leader of Scottish Liberal Democrats
United Kingdom	Kate Forbes	Scottish Cabinet Secretary for Finance and the Economy
United Kingdom	Angus Robertson	Scottish Cabinet Secretary for the Constitution, External Affairs and Culture
United Kingdom	Ross Greer	Member of the Scottish Parliament for the Greens
United Kingdom	Lorna Slater	Member of the Scottish Parliament for the Greens
United Kingdom	Helen Bower-Easton	Official Spokesperson of the Foreign Office
United Kingdom	Laurence Lee	Second Permanent Secretary of the British Ministry of Defence
United Kingdom	Ian Blackford	Leader of Scottish National Party
United Kingdom	William Hague	Former Secretary of State for Foreign, Commonwealth and Development Affairs of the United Kingdom
United Kingdom	Francis Baring, 6th Baron Northbrook	Conservative MP
United Kingdom	Christopher Tugendhat, Baron Tugendhat	Conservative MP
United Kingdom	James Douglas-Hamilton, Baron Selkirk of Douglas	Conservative MP
United Kingdom	Michael Morris, Baron Naseby	Conservative MP
United Kingdom	Nigel Adams	Minister of State without Portfolio
United Kingdom	Phillip Lee	Liberal Democrat Spokesperson for Justice
United Kingdom	Julian Lewis	Chair of the Intelligence and Security Committee
United Kingdom	Neil O'Brien	Parliamentary Under-Secretary of State for Levelling Up, The Union and Constitution
United Kingdom	Jo Churchill	Parliamentary Under-Secretary of State for Agri-Innovation and Climate Adaptation
United Kingdom	Nicola Sturgeon	First Minister of Scotland
United Kingdom	Angus Robertson	Scottish Cabinet Secretary for the Constitution, External Affairs and Culture
United Kingdom	Francis Ingham	General Director of the Public Relations and Communications Association
United Kingdom	Nicky Regazzoni	Co-founder of the PR Network
United Kingdom	Hamish de Bretton-Gordon	Chemical weapons expert, former director of SecureBio Limited, Commanding officer of the UK's Joint Chemical, Biological, Radiological and Nuclear Regiment and NATO's Rapid Reaction CBRN Battalion
United Kingdom	Fiona Hyslop	Former Scottish Cabinet Secretary for Economy, Fair Work and Culture
United Kingdom	James Heappey	Minister for the Armed Forces
United Kingdom	Annabel Goldie	Minister of State for Defence
United Kingdom	Deborah Turness	CEO of BBC News
United Kingdom	Charles Gurassa	Chair of the Guardian Media Group
United Kingdom	Justin Hedges	Former 1* Deputy Commander of UK Special Mission Group, co-founder of Prevail Partners Limited
United Kingdom	Lucy Frazer	Secretary of State for Culture, Media and Sport
United Kingdom	Nadine Dorries	Former Secretary of State for Digital, Culture, Media and Sport
United Kingdom	Piers Morgan	Presenter of TV channel "IT-Vi"
United Kingdom	Suella Braverman	Attorney General for England and Wales and advocate general for Northern Ireland
United Kingdom	Kwasi Kwarteng	Minister of Entrepreneurship, Energy and Industrial Strategy
United Kingdom	Rishi Sunak	Prime Minister of the United Kingdom and former Chancellor
United Kingdom	Priti Patel	Home Secretary
United Kingdom	Dominic Grieve	Former attorney general for England and Wales
United Kingdom	Steve Barclay	Downing Street Chief of Staff and Chancellor of the Duchy of Lancaster
United Kingdom	Nick Clegg	Former Deputy Prime Minister of the United Kingdom
United Kingdom	Philip Dunne	Minister for Defence Procurement
United Kingdom	Nick Houghton	Chief of the Defence Staff of the British Armed Forces
United Kingdom	Edward McMillan-Scott	Member of European Parliament
United Kingdom	Andrew Parker	Director-general of the British Security Service
United Kingdom	Malcolm Rifkind	Chairman of the Intelligence and Security Committee
United Kingdom	Andrew Robathan	Member of Parliament
United Kingdom	John Sawers	Former Chief of the Secret Intelligence Service
United Kingdom	Robert Walter	Member of Parliament
United Kingdom	HSBC	British multinational universal bank and financial services holding company
United Kingdom	Strilets UK Ltd.	
United Kingdom	Espace Soft Trading Ltd.	Metal Products fabricater in Upper Norwood
United Kingdom	Robert Elliott	CEO of Zinc Network
United Kingdom	Scott Brown	Executive Director of Zinc Network
United Kingdom	Louis Brooke	Executive Director of Research and Strategy of Zinc Network
United Kingdom	Hazel UK Ltd.	company specialised in supply and repair/overhaul of aviation equipment manufactured in former USSR/CIS countries
United States	Antony Blinken	United States Secretary of State
United States	Barack Obama	Former president
United States	JD Vance	Republican senator for Ohio
United States	Eric Schmitt	Republican senator for Missouri
United States	Richard Armitage (government official)	13th United States Deputy Secretary of State
United States	Jason Blazakis	Director of the Center for the Study of Terrorism, Extremism and Counter-Terrorism at the Middlebury Institute of International Studies
United States	Hector Balderas	Former New Mexico attorney general
United States	Charles Q. Brown Jr.	Chief of staff of the Air Force.
United States	Stephen C. Bowsher	President of In-Q-Tel Corporation
United States	Chris Brady	President of General Dynamics
United States	Andrea G. Botta	Chairman of the Board of Directors of the company "Shernier"
United States	Rob Bonta	California attorney general
United States	Michael Barr (U.S. official)	Vice Chairman of the Federal Reserve
United States	Neal Blue	Co-owner, chairman, and CEO of General Atomics
United States	Michael Leroy Byrd	The police officer who killed Ashley Babbit during the so-called. "storming the Capitol"
United States	Lester Arnold	Vice President of RAND Corporation Research Center
United States	Michael J. Abramowitz	President of NGO Freedom House
United States	Bruce Adams	Executive Vice President of In-Q-Tel Corporation
United States	Jill M. Albertelli	President of Military Engine Division, Pratt & Whitney Corporation
United States	Katie Britt	Republican senator for Alabama
United States	Ben Rhodes	Former Deputy National Security Advisor for Strategic Communications and Speechwriting
United States	Jack Smith (lawyer)	Special Counsel for the United States Department of Justice
United States	Joe Lieberman	Politician, lobbyist, and attorney who served as a United States senator from Connecticut from 1989 to 2013
United States	Wesley Clark	Supreme Allied Commander Europe of NATO from 1997 to 2000, commanding Operation Allied Force during the Kosovo War
United States	Bob Menendez	Chairman of the Senate Committee on Foreign Relations
United States	Michael M. Crow	Educator, science and technology scholar, and university design architect, 16th and current president of Arizona State University
United States	Caroline Atkinson	Former Deputy National Security Advisor for International Economic Affairs
United States	Dan Coats (Note: Coats had introduced a resolution in the Senate before the sanctions were imposed that outlined specific steps he believed the Obama administration should take to sanction and isolate Russia.)	Former Member of the Senate Select Committee on Intelligence
United States	Daniel Pfeiffer	Former Senior Advisor to the President of the United States
United States	Harry Reid (d. 2021)	Former Senate Majority Leader
United States	Hillary Clinton	Former United States Secretary of State and 2016 presidential candidate
United States	John Boehner	Former Speaker of the House
United States	Nancy Pelosi	Former Speaker of the House
United States	Elise Stefanik	Chair of the House Republican Conference
United States	Liz Cheney	Former chair of the House Republican Conference
United States	Mark Takano	Chair of the House Veterans' Affairs Committee
United States	Doris Matsui	Member of the U.S. House of Representatives
United States	Greg Steube	Member of the U.S. House of Representatives
United States	Marjorie Taylor Greene	Member of the U.S. House of Representatives
United States	Andy Biggs	Member of the U.S. House of Representatives
United States	Don Bacon	Member of the U.S. House of Representatives
United States	Jim Banks	Member of the U.S. House of Representatives
United States	Ami Bera	Member of the U.S. House of Representatives
United States	John Bolton	Former National Security Adviser to the president, former Permanent Representative to the UN
United States	Thomas Arnold Arseneault	President and Senior Executive Director of the American division of BAE Systems
United States	Anthony Brown	Member of the U.S. House of Representatives
United States	Francis William Biden	Brother of Joe Biden
United States	James Brian Biden	Brother of Joe Biden
United States	Valerie Biden Owens	Sister of Joe Biden
United States	Paul Pelosi	Husband of Nancy Pelosi
United States	George Akerlof	Husband of Janet Yellen
United States	Ivo Daalder	Former US Permanent Representative to NATO
United States	Alyssa Demus	Expert of the RAND Corporation research center
United States	Nadine Arslanian	Wife of R. Menendez
United States	Lynn Rosenman Garland	Wife of M. Garland
United States	Amy Gowder	President and CEO of General Electric Aviation Military Systems
United States	Frank A. St. John	COO of Lockheed Martin Corporation
United States	John Hoover	Senior Vice President and CEO of US National Defense University
United States	Chris Johnson	Senior Vice President of Maxar Technologies
United States	Mahmoud Bah	Deputy CEO of Millennium Challenge Corporation
United States	Richard D. Anderson Jr.	Professor Emeritus of University of California
United States	Robert Bierman	Member of the Board of Balkan Investigative Reporting Network
United States	Iris Weinshall	Wife of C. Schumer
United States	Mo Brooks	Member of the U.S. House of Representative
United States	Pete Buttigieg	US Secretary of Transportation
United States	Lael Brainard	Vice Chair of the Federal Reserve, Wife of K. Campbell
United States	John Abizaid	Retired army general, adviser to the Minister of Defense of Ukraine
United States	Ian Bremmer	Political scientist and author with a focus on global political risk, president and founder of Eurasia Group
United States	Fred W. Wagenhals	CEO and chairman of the Board of Ammo Inc.
United States	George C. Barnes	Deputy Director of the National Security Agency
United States	Dick Weller	Doctor of the Pacific Northwest Laboratory
United States	Roy Azevedo	President of Raytheon Intelligence & Space
United States	Tom Vilsack	US Secretary of Agriculture
United States	Glen D. VanHerck	Commander of the Joint Command of the Aerospace Defense of the North American Continent and the Northern Command of the US Armed Forces
United States	Jim Jordan	Member of the U.S. House of Representatives
United States	Virginia Foxx	Member of the U.S. House of Representatives
United States	Ann Wagner	Member of the U.S. House of Representatives
United States	Daniel Alan Webster	Member of the U.S. House of Representatives
United States	Mike Gallagher	Member of the U.S. House of Representatives
United States	Anthony Gonzalez	Member of the U.S. House of Representatives
United States	John Garamendi	Member of the U.S. House of Representatives
United States	Scott DesJarlais	Member of the U.S. House of Representatives
United States	Debbie Lesko	Member of the U.S. House of Representatives
United States	Tom Suozzi	Member of the U.S. House of Representatives
United States	Judy Chu	Member of the U.S. House of Representatives
United States	Rashida Tlaib	Member of the U.S. House of Representatives
United States	Suzan DelBene	Member of the U.S. House of Representatives
United States	Jay Obernolte	Member of the U.S. House of Representatives
United States	Thomas Massie	Member of the U.S. House of Representatives
United States	Greg Pence	Member of the U.S. House of Representatives
United States	Mike Levin	Member of the U.S. House of Representatives
United States	Joaquin Castro	Member of the U.S. House of Representatives
United States	John Katko	Member of the U.S. House of Representatives
United States	Lori Trahan	Member of the U.S. House of Representatives
United States	Donna Brazile	Veteran political strategist and former interim Democratic National Committee chair
United States	Michael R. Carpenter	US Ambassador to OSCE
United States	Scott Perry	Member of the U.S. House of Representatives
United States	Cori Bush	Member of the U.S. House of Representatives
United States	Alexandria Ocasio-Cortez	Member of the U.S. House of Representatives
United States	Tom Tiffany	Member of the U.S. House of Representatives
United States	Steve Chabot	Member of the U.S. House of Representatives
United States	Mike Waltz	Member of the U.S. House of Representatives
United States	Paul Gosar	Member of the U.S. House of Representatives
United States	Lauren Boebert	Member of the U.S. House of Representatives
United States	Madison Cawthorn	Member of the U.S. House of Representatives
United States	Louie Gohmert	Member of the U.S. House of Representatives
United States	Daniel Crenshaw	Member of the U.S. House of Representatives
United States	Ronny Jackson	Member of the U.S. House of Representatives
United States	Matt Gaetz	Member of the U.S. House of Representatives
United States	Dean Phillips	Member of the U.S. House of Representatives
United States	Steve Womack	Member of the U.S. House of Representatives
United States	Alma Adams	Member of the U.S. House of Representatives
United States	Young Kim	Member of the U.S. House of Representatives
United States	Grace Meng	Member of the U.S. House of Representatives
United States	Nancy Mace	Member of the U.S. House of Representatives
United States	Tim Ryan	Member of the U.S. House of Representatives
United States	Chip Roy	Member of the U.S. House of Representatives
United States	Michael Guest	Member of the U.S. House of Representatives
United States	Mike McCaul	Member of the U.S. House of Representatives
United States	Eric Swalwell	Member of the U.S. House of Representatives
United States	Brian Babin	Member of the U.S. House of Representatives
United States	Michael Cloud	Member of the U.S. House of Representatives
United States	H. R. McMaster	Former Assistant to the president of the United States for National Security
United States	Mike McFaul	7th United States Ambassador to Russia, Director of the F. Spogli Institute for International Studies, Stanford University
United States	Federico Peña	8th United States Secretary of Energy, Member of the Board of Directors of Wells Fargo Bank
United States	Stephen Sestanovich	Professor at Columbia University, member of the Council on Foreign Relations
United States	Bret Stephens	Opinion columnist for The New York Times and senior contributor to NBC News
United States	Robert Scales	Retired US Army major general and former commandant of US Army War College
United States	Brad Smith	Vice chairman and president of Microsoft
United States	Citibank	Primary U.S. banking subsidiary of financial services multinational Citigroup
United States	JPMorgan Chase	Multinational investment bank and financial services holding company
United States	Goldman Sachs	Multinational investment bank and financial services holding company
United States	American Express	Multinational corporation specialized in payment card services
United States	Western Union DP Vostok	Subsidiary of the Western Union international money transfer payment system in Russia
United States	PayPal	Multinational financial technology company operating an online payments system
United States	Lee Zeldin	Member of the U.S. House of Representatives
United States	Greg Meeks	Member of the U.S. House of Representatives
United States	Maria Salazar	Member of the U.S. House of Representatives
United States	Conor Lamb	Member of the U.S. House of Representatives
United States	John Brennan	Former CIA Director
United States	Gina Haspel	Former CIA Director
United States	Ash Carter	Former Secretary of Defense
United States	Selena Gomez	Singer
United States	Patrick F. Kennedy	Former United States Ambassador to the United Nations
United States	Michael Kempner	Founder and CEO of MikeWorldWide, Fundraiser for the Democratic Party
United States	Brian Deese	13th Director of the National Economic Council
United States	Robert P. Ashley Jr.	Former director of the United States Defense Intelligence Agency
United States	Melissa Drisko	First Deputy Director of the United States Department of Defense Intelligence Agency
United States	Robert Greenblatt	Former chairman of NBC Entertainment and WarnerMedia Entertainment
United States	George A. Salof	Director of Airtronic Systems
United States	John Keane	Retired general, chairman of the analytical center "Institute for the Study of War"
United States	Matthew S. Borman	Deputy Assistant Secretary of Commerce for Export Administration
United States	Jennifer Bachus	Chief, Bureau of Cyber Security and Digital Policy, Department of State
United States	Calvin Shivers	Deputy director of the FBI
United States	Thomas S. Schievelbein	Former CEO of United Airlines, Lead Director of New York Life's Board of Directors
United States	Monica Medina	Deputy Secretary of State for Ocean Conservation, International Cooperation in the Field of Science and the Environment, wife of R. Klein
United States	Meghan O'Sullivan	Former Assistant to the president and Deputy National Security Advisor for Iraq and Afghanistan
United States	Dana Boente	Former acting United States Attorney General
United States	Joseph L. Lengyel	28th chief of the National Guard Bureau
United States	Daniel R. Hokanson	29th chief of the National Guard Bureau
United States	Andrew Rohling	Deputy Chair of the NATO Military Committee
United States	Kathryn Huff	Assistant Secretary of Energy for Nuclear Energy
United States	John J. Sullivan (diplomat)	Former US Ambassador to Russia
United States	Wendy Sherman	Former Deputy Secretary of State
United States	Jimmy Kirby	Deputy Director of Financial Intelligence
United States	Walter E. Carter Jr.	Retired vice admiral and the 17th and current president of The Ohio State University
United States	William Marshall (entrepreneur)	founder and CEO of Planet Labs
United States	Paul Roderick Gregory	professor of economics at the University of Houston
United States	Edward P. Joseph	Adjunct Lecturer, Johns Hopkins University, Member of the International Advisory Committee, Belgrade Centre for Security Policy
United States	Peter Daszak	Zoologist, consultant and public expert on disease ecology, President of EcoHealth Alliance
United States	Cindy Dyer	Ambassador-at-Large to Monitor and Combat Trafficking in Persons
United States	Tressa Steffen Guenov	Principal Deputy Assistant Secretary of Defence for International Security Affairs
United States	Kelly Matzen	Chief Technology Officer of Oxitec
United States	Stephen J. Blank	Senior Fellow, Foreign Policy Research Institute
United States	Trevor Brown	Dean of the John Glenn College of Public Affairs at the Ohio State University
United States	Al Clark (Blackwater)	founder of Blackwater PMC
United States	Melissa L. Gilliam	Pediatric and adolescent gynecologist. Provost of Ohio State University
United States	Nathan Wolfe	founder of Metabiota
United States	Kevin Weil	President of Product and Business, Planet Labs
United States	Lorraine Voles	Chief of Staff to the Vice President
United States	Alex Vindman	former Director for European Affairs for the United States National Security Council
United States	Daniel Bessner	Associate Professor, University of Washington
United States	Charles Maxwell Becker	Deputy Head, Department of Economics, Duke University
United States	Jeffrey Veidlinger	Professor of History and Judaic Studies, University of Michigan
United States	Lawrence Summers	71st United States Secretary of the Treasury
United States	Matthew Miller (spokesperson)	Spokesperson for the United States Department of State
United States	Payam Banazadeh	Executive director of Capella Space
United States	Drew Sullivan	Co-founder and publisher of the Organized Crime and Corruption Reporting Project
United States	Jeffrey Wood	General manager of the American representative office of Kongsberg Protech Systems
United States	Kathi Vidal	Under Secretary of Commerce for Intellectual Property
United States	Kirkland H. Donald	Former director of the U.S. Navy's nuclear propulsion program
United States	James C. O'Brien	Head of the Office of Sanctions Coordination
United States	Marshall Billingslea	Former Assistant Secretary for Terrorist Financing
United States	Ian Brzezinski	Son of Zbigniew Brzezinski, Expert of Atlantic Council
United States	Geoffrey D. Miller	Major General, Commander of the Guantanamo Bay Naval Base (2002–2003)
United States	Tim Naftali	New York University professor, CNN commentator
United States	Lady Gaga	Singer, songwriter, and actress
United States	Derek S. Odney	DEA Special Agent
United States	Sarah Hirshland	CEO of the US Olympic and Paralympic Committees
United States	Bradley A. Mims	Deputy Chief of the US Civil Aviation Service
United States	Lisa Monaco	Assistant to the president of the United States for Homeland Security and Counterterrorism (until 2017)
United States	Eric Crawford	Member of the U.S. House of Representatives
United States	Andy Harris	Member of the U.S. House of Representatives
United States	Andy Kim	Member of the U.S. House of Representatives
United States	Brian Babin	Member of the U.S. House of Representatives
United States	Suzanne Bonamici	Member of the U.S. House of Representatives
United States	Michelle Steel	Member of the U.S. House of Representatives
United States	Claudia Tenney	Member of the U.S. House of Representatives
United States	Pete Aguilar	Member of the U.S. House of Representatives
United States	Robert Aderholt	Member of the U.S. House of Representatives
United States	Richard S. Adler	Forensic & Clinical Psychiatrist
United States	Michael Burgess	Member of the U.S. House of Representatives
United States	Elissa Slotkin	Member of the U.S. House of Representatives
United States	Steve Scalise	Member of the U.S. House of Representatives
United States	Pete Sessions	Member of the U.S. House of Representatives
United States	Colin Allred	Member of the U.S. House of Representatives
United States	Raja Krishnamoorthi	Member of the U.S. House of Representatives
United States	Steve Cohen	Member of the U.S. House of Representatives
United States	Jerrold Nadler	Member of the U.S. House of Representatives
United States	Alan Lowenthal	Member of the U.S. House of Representatives
United States	Andy Levin	Member of the U.S. House of Representatives
United States	David Kustoff	Member of the U.S. House of Representatives
United States	Debbie Wasserman Schultz	Member of the U.S. House of Representatives
United States	Kat Cammack	Member of the U.S. House of Representatives
United States	Darrell Issa	Member of the U.S. House of Representatives
United States	Jake Ellzey	Member of the U.S. House of Representatives
United States	Brad Wenstrup	Member of the U.S. House of Representatives
United States	Scott Franklin	Member of the U.S. House of Representatives
United States	Joe Wilson	Member of the U.S. House of Representatives, member of the House Republican Policy Committee and an assistant Republican whip
United States	Seth Moulton	Member of the U.S. House of Representatives
United States	Rob Reiner	Actor and filmmaker
United States	Ellen Weintraub	Commissioner of the Federal Election Commission
United States	Elaine Chao	18th United States secretary of transportation
United States	James D. Taiclet	President and CEO of Lockheed Martin Corporation
United States	Rich Templeton	President and CEO of Texas Instruments
United States	Jason Gaverick Matheny	President and CEO of RAND
United States	Frederick Kempe	President and CEO of Atlantic Council
United States	Chris Kubasik	President and CEO of L3Harris Technologies
United States	B. Chance Saltzman	Chief of space operations
United States	Frederick Kagan	Senior Fellow and Project Manager, Critical Threat Analysis, Institute for the Study of War
United States	Kimberly Kagan	Founder and president of the Institute for the Study of War
United States	J. B. Pritzker	Governor of Illinois
United States	Henry McMaster	Governor of South Carolina
United States	Jay Inslee	Governor of Washington
United States	Laura Kelly	Governor of Kansas
United States	Brian Kemp	Governor of Georgia
United States	Roy Cooper	Governor of North Carolina
United States	Ned Lamont	Governor of Connecticut
United States	Brad Little	Governor of Idaho
United States	Bill Lee (Tennessee politician)	Governor of Tennessee
United States	Jim Justice	Governor of West Virginia
United States	Brad Little	Governor of Idaho
United States	Mike Dunleavy (politician)	Governor of Alaska
United States	Mark Gordon	Governor of Wyoming
United States	John Carney (Delaware politician)	Governor of Delaware
United States	Josh Green (politician)	Governor of Hawaii
United States	Michelle Lujan Grisham	Governor of New Mexico
United States	Dan McKee	Governor of Rhode Island
United States	Phil Murphy	Governor of New Jersey
United States	Mary Kathryn Muenster	Wife of J. B. Pritzker
United States	Jennifer Siebel Newsom	Wife of G. Newsom
United States	Larry Hogan	Governor of Maryland
United States	Kay Ivey	Governor of Alabama
United States	Charlie Baker	Former Governor of Massachusetts
United States	Andy Beshear	Governor of Kentucky
United States	Doug Burgum	Governor of North Dakota
United States	Phil Scott	Governor of Vermont
United States	Tim Walz	Governor of Minnesota
United States	Eric Holcomb	Governor of Indiana
United States	John Bel Edwards	Governor of Louisiana
United States	Pete Ricketts	Governor of Nebraska
United States	Mike Parson	Governor of Missouri
United States	John Edwards	Governor of North Carolina
United States	Tate Reeves	Governor of Mississippi
United States	Tony Evers	Governor of Wisconsin
United States	Jared Polis	Governor of Colorado
United States	Eric Holcomb	Governor of Indiana
United States	Steve Sisolak	Former Governor of Nevada
United States	Kate Brown	Former Governor of Oregon
United States	Tom Wolf	Former Governor of Pennsylvania
United States	Jocelyn Benson	Secretary of State of Michigan
United States	Robert J. Rodriguez	Secretary of State of New York
United States	Kay Coles James	Secretary of State of Virginia
United States	Shenna Bellows	Secretary of State of Maine
United States	Brian Bingman	Secretary of State of Oklahoma
United States	Shirley Weber	Secretary of State of California
United States	Scott Schwab	Secretary of State of Kansas
United States	Shemia Fagan	Secretary of State of Oregon
United States	Gus L. Hargett Jr.	Former Adjutant General of Tennessee
United States	William F. Galvin	Secretary of State of Massachusetts
United States	Mac Warner	Secretary of State of West Virginia
United States	Steve Hobbs (Washington politician)	Secretary of State of Washington
United States	Kristen Clarke	Assistant Attorney General for the Civil Rights Division at the United States Department of Justice
United States	Mark Hertling	Former Commanding General of United States Army Europe and the Seventh Army
United States	William Bender	Head of Business Development at Leidos, retired US Air Force Lieutenant General
United States	Karen M. Bonaby	Advisor to the Ministry of Defense of Moldova
United States	Adam M. Scheinman	Special Representative of U.S. President for Nuclear Nonproliferation
United States	Ellen Weintraub	Former chair of the Federal Election Commission
United States	Shana M. Broussard	Former chair of the Federal Election Commission
United States	Allen Dickerson	Former chair of the Federal Election Commission
United States	Sean J. Cooksey	Commissioner of the Federal Election Commission
United States	James E. Trainor III	Former chair of the Federal Election Commission
United States	Tae Johnson	Acting Director of the U.S. Immigration and Customs Enforcement
United States	Troy A. Miller	Acting Commissioner of the United States Customs and Border Protection
United States	Benjamine Huffman	Acting Deputy Head of the Customs and Border Control Service
United States	Peter B. Zwack	Former Military Attaché at the US Embassy in Russia, Retired Brigadier General
United States	Crystal E. Ashby	Director of BAE Systems
United States	Deb Haaland	US Secretary of the Interior
United States	John P. Pearson	Assistant Attorney for Texas
United States	Reginald Hill	Stepson of L. Austin
United States	Christopher Hill	Stepson of L. Austin
United States	Christine Pelosi	Daughter of N. Pelosi
United States	Eleanor McConnell	Daughter of M. McConnell
United States	Allison Guimard	Daughter of R. Scott
United States	Alison Emma Schumer	Daughter of C. Schumer
United States	Hanna Gardi	Head of the Moldovan branch of the "Peace Corps"
United States	Raymond S. Kalouche	CEO of TMS Steel Company
United States	Rebecca Hersman	Director of the Defense Threat Reduction Agency
United States	Thomas Laliberty	President of Land Warfare & Air Defense at Raytheon Missiles & Defense
United States	Nicholas Young	President and CEO of Desert Tech
United States	Steve Parker	Vice-president and General Manager of Bombers & Fighters division within Boeing Defense
United States	Jonathan Geithner	Vice President and Director of Marine Corps Program
United States	Olivia Alair Dalton	Deputy Assistant to the president and White House Principal Deputy Press Secretary
United States	Caitlin Durkovich	Special Assistant to the president and Deputy Homeland Security Advisor for Resilience and Response, National Security Council
United States	Himamauli Das	Acting Director of Dept of the Treasury/Financial Crimes Enforcement Network
United States	Carl Glaeser	Member of the board of directors of the NGO Center for a New American Security
United States	William H. Osborne	Former Senior Vice President of Operations and Total Quality, The Boeing Company
United States	Anita Dunn	Senior Advisor to the president for Communications
United States	John F. Tefft	8th United States Ambassador to Russia
United States	Joe Scarborough	Television host, attorney, political commentator, and former politician who is the co-host of Morning Joe on MSNBC
United States	Brad Raffensperger	29th Secretary of State of Georgia
United States	Sarah Huckabee Sanders	47th governor of Arkansas
United States	Jon Huntsman Jr.	16th Governor of Utah, former ambassador of the United States to Russia and China
United States	David F. Stewart	Commanding General of the 32nd Army Air and Missile Defense Command
United States	Gurbir Grewal	Director of the Division of Enforcement, Securities and Exchange Commission
United States	Jack A. Fusco	Director, President and chief executive officer of Cheniere Energy, Inc.
United States	Steve Heilman	Managing partner of Mobility Impact Partners
United States	Michael Driscoll	Head of FBI's New York Office
United States	Ellen Rosenblum	Attorney General of Oregon
United States	Phil Weiser	Attorney General of Colorado
United States	Lisa Wang	Assistant Secretary of Commerce for Enforcement and Compliance
United States	Christine Wormuth	25th United States Secretary of the Army
United States	John Formella	Attorney General of New Hampshire
United States	Aaron D. Ford	Attorney General of Nevada
United States	Bob Ferguson (politician)	Attorney General of Washington
United States	Channing D. Phillips	Ex-Attorney General for the District of Columbia
United States	Brian Williams	Former NBC television host
United States	Shannon Simrell	Helsinki Commission Representative to the U.S. Mission to the OSCE
United States	Laura Taylor Swain	Chief district judge of the United States District Court for the Southern District of New York
United States	Peter Roskam	Former Member of the U.S. House of Representatives from Illinois's 6th district
United States	Heather Cox Richardson	Professor of history at Boston College
United States	Matthew M. Graves	Attorney for the District of Columbia
United States	William Tong	Attorney for the District of Connecticut
United States	Karl Racine	Ex-Attorney for the District of Columbia
United States	Carlos Del Toro	78th United States Secretary of the Navy
United States	John P. Walters	President and chief executive officer of Hudson Institute, "Drug Czar"
United States	Letitia James	Attorney General of New York
United States	Kathy Jennings	Attorney General of Delaware
United States	T. J. Donovan	Ex-Attorney General of Vermont
United States	Jim Pillen	Attorney General of Nebraska
United States	John M. O'Connor	Ex-Attorney General of Oklahoma
United States	Chuck Hagel	Ex-Secretary of Defense
United States	Brian Frosh	Ex-Attorney General of Maryland
United States	Matthew G. Olsen	Assistant Attorney General for the National Security Division
United States	Geoffrey R. Pyatt	8th United States Ambassador to Ukraine
United States	Kwame Raoul	Attorney General of Illinois
United States	Josh Kaul	Attorney General of Wisconsin
United States	Jason Miyares	Attorney General of Virginia
United States	Peter Neronha	Attorney General of Rhode Island
United States	Audrey Strauss	Attorney for the Southern District of New York
United States	Mark C. Roualet	Executive Vice President of General Dynamics Corporation
United States	Dilpreet Sidhu	Deputy Chief of Staff of the Deputy Minister of Defense
United States	Audrey Strauss	Attorney for the Southern District of New York
United States	Marie Yovanovitch	Former Ambassador to Ukraine
United States	Julie Su	Deputy Secretary of Labor
United States	Joseph Dunford	19th chairman of the Joint Chiefs of Staff
United States	Aisha Kirmani Zafar	Chief Financial Officer of Carnegie Endowment
United States	Mary Menell Zients	Wife of D. Zients
United States	Natalie Jaresko	Former Minister of Finance of Ukraine
United States	Jonathan Lenzner	FBI chief of staff
United States	Jonathan Lenzner	Former Deputy Special Assistant to the president of the United States for Migration
United States	John F. W. Rogers	Executive Vice President, Chief of Staff and Secretary to the Board of Goldman Sachs, Chairman of Atlantic Council
United States	Nina Jankowicz	Former executive director of Department of Homeland Security Counter Disinformation Board
United States	Keith Ellison	Attorney General of Minnesota
United States	Andy Ogles	Member of the U.S. House of Representatives from Tennessee's 5th district
United States	Cecilia Rouse	Chair of the White House Council of Economic Advisers
United States	Robert Zoellick	11th President of the World Bank Group
United States	Frank Kendall III	Secretary of the Air Force
United States	Jimmy Kimmel	Television host, comedian, writer, and producer
United States	Rachel Maddow	Television news program host and liberal political commentator.
United States	Stephen Colbert	Comedian, writer, producer, political commentator, actor, and television host
United States	Jeff Zients	White House Chief of Staff
United States	Ernest Moniz	13th United States Secretary of Energy
United States	Alan Е. Kohler Jr.	Assistant director of the FBI's Counterintelligence Division
United States	Melanie Nakagawa	Vice President of Microsoft Corporation
United States	David Marlowe	Deputy Director for Operations, CIA
United States	Mark Kontos	Chief Financial Officer at Radio Free Europe/Radio Liberty
United States	Frank A. Rose	Principal Deputy Administrator of the National Nuclear Security Administration at the Department of Energy
United States	Alexander Soros	Son of G. Soros, Deputy Chair of Open Society Foundations and one of the World Economic Forum's Young Global Leaders
United States	Maura Healey	73rd Governor of Massachusetts
United States	Katie Hobbs	24th governor of Arizona
United States	Josh Shapiro	48th Governor of Pennsylvania
United States	Eric Schmitt	Republican senator from Missouri
United States	Shane G. Eddy	President of Pratt & Whitney Corporation
United States	Mark Esper	27th United States secretary of defense
United States	Paul Abbate	18th Deputy Director of the Federal Bureau of Investigation
United States	Michael R. Sherwin	Former Attorney for the District of Columbia
United States	Fiona Hill (presidential advisor)	Former Senior Director for Russia and Central Asia, National Security Council
United States	Rajiv Shah	President of the Rockefeller Foundation
United States	Desert Tech	Rifle manufacturer
United States	TCL International Inc	Defense and Aerospace Manufacturing Company wholly owned subsidiary of SPX Technologies
United States	Hans Binnendijk	Former NSC Senior Director for Defense Policy and Arms Control, Fellow at the Atlantic Council Research Center and RAND Corporation External Expert
United States	Nathan Lewin	Attorney
United States	Tina Kotek	39th governor of Oregon
United States	Jared Polis	Governor of Colorado
United States	Vivek Lall	Chief Executive of General Atomics
United States	Rebecca Friedman Lissner	Deputy National Security Adviser to Vice President Kamala Harris
United States	Seth Meyers	Stand-up comedian, television host, actor, writer, and producer
United States	Mitch Landrieu	White House Coordinator for the Infrastructure Investment and Jobs Act
United States	Arati Prabhakar	12th Director of the Office of Science and Technology Policy
United States	Amanda Mansour	Special Assistant to the president and Senior Director for Partnerships & Global Engagement at National Security Council, The White House
United States	Nicholas Alan Lashinsky	Fortune magazine employee
United States	Yolanda Lopez	Acting Director of Voice of America
United States	William W. Lothrop	Deputy Director of the Federal Bureau of Prisons
United States	Colette S. Peters	Director of the Federal Bureau of Prisons
United States	Alyza D. Lewin	President of the Louis D. Brandeis Center for Human Rights Under Law
United States	Ofman Yosef Chaim	Member of Los Angeles Non Profit Group “Ohr Avrohom and Eliyahu"
United States	Hiroaki Kuromiya	Honorary Professor of History at Indiana University
United States	James Cannon	AM General's president and chief executive officer
United States	Moshe Cohen	US Citizen
United States	Avrohom Yitzhak Weisfish	US Citizen
United States	Sara Jacobs	Member of the U.S. House of Representatives
United States	Brett Guthrie	Member of the U.S. House of Representatives
United States	Ann Wagner	Member of the U.S. House of Representatives
United States	Carlos A. Giménez	Member of the U.S. House of Representatives
United States	Andrew Clyde	Member of the U.S. House of Representatives
United States	Vern Buchanan	Member of the U.S. House of Representatives
United States	Frank Lucas	Member of the U.S. House of Representatives
United States	Bill Johnson (Ohio politician)	Member of the U.S. House of Representatives
United States	Rodney Davis (politician)	Member of the U.S. House of Representatives
United States	Doug Lamborn	Member of the U.S. House of Representatives
United States	Jessie Liu	Former Attorney for the District of Columbia
United States	Ro Khanna	Member of the U.S. House of Representatives
United States	Yvette Herrell	Member of the U.S. House of Representatives
United States	Steven Palazzo	Member of the U.S. House of Representatives
United States	Mariannette Miller-Meeks	Member of the U.S. House of Representatives
United States	Mary Miller (politician)	Member of the U.S. House of Representatives
United States	Tracy Mann	Member of the U.S. House of Representatives
United States	Brad Sherman	Member of the U.S. House of Representatives
United States	Lisa McClain	Member of the U.S. House of Representatives
United States	David McKinley	Member of the U.S. House of Representatives
United States	Blaine Luetkemeyer	Member of the U.S. House of Representatives
United States	French Hill	Member of the U.S. House of Representatives
United States	Clay Higgins	Member of the U.S. House of Representatives
United States	Maxine Waters	Member of the U.S. House of Representatives
United States	Ken Calvert	Member of the U.S. House of Representatives
United States	Joe Wilson	Member of the U.S. House of Representatives
United States	Patrick McHenry	Member of the U.S. House of Representatives
United States	Anthony Gonzalez	Member of the U.S. House of Representatives
United States	Andy Barr	Member of the U.S. House of Representatives
United States	John Barrasso	Republican senator for Wyoming
United States	Patrick J. Lechleitner	Acting Deputy Director of Immigration and Customs Enforcement
United States	James Marks	Former head of the intelligence center of the US Army, retired brigadier general
United States	Stephanie Roland	Deputy Director of Program Management in Moldova and Belarus of the International Republican Institute
United States	Charles Sweeder	Financial Director of the NGO "International Humanitarian Aid Moldova-Keystone"
United States	Scott Hocklander	Head of the USAID in Moldova
United States	Charles J. Hooker III	Head of the NGO "International Humanitarian Aid Moldova-Keystone"
United States	Adam Kinzinger	Member of the U.S. House of Representatives
United States	Ted Lieu	Member of the U.S. House of Representatives
United States	Annie Kuster	Member of the U.S. House of Representatives
United States	Kai Kahele	Member of the U.S. House of Representatives
United States	John Carter	Member of the U.S. House of Representatives
United States	Timothy D. Snyder	Richard C. Levin Professor of History at Yale University
United States	Jim McGovern	Member of the U.S. House of Representatives
United States	Kevin McCarthy	Speaker of the House
United States	Norman Barbosa	General manager and Associate General Counsel, Law Enforcement, National Security and Telecom at Microsoft
United States	Tom Malinowski	Member of the U.S. House of Representatives
United States	Stephanie Murphy	Member of the U.S. House of Representatives
United States	Peter Meijer	Member of the U.S. House of Representatives
United States	Chris Smith	Member of the U.S. House of Representatives
United States	Abigail Spanberger	Member of the U.S. House of Representatives
United States	Dick Durbin	Member of the U.S. House of Representatives
United States	George Soros	Hungarian-born American businessman
United States	Joseph M. Evangelisti	Head of Communications and Media Relations at JP Morgan Chase Bank
United States	Nury Turkel	Member of the USCIRF
United States	Gayle Manchin	Co-chair of USCIRF
United States	Ziff brothers	Investment entrepreneurs
United States	Oprah Winfrey	Talk show host, television producer, actress, author, and philanthropist
United States	Robert Mueller	Former director of the FBI
United States	Julia Pierson	Former director of the United States Secret Service
United States	Michael Posner	Professor at New York University, former US Under Secretary of State for Democracy, Human Rights and Labor,
United States	Dinesh Paliwal	Indian American business executive
United States	Steven Pifer	Senior fellow at the Brookings Institution's Center on the United States and Europe, director of Brookings' Arms Control Initiative, former senior adviser with the Center for Strategic & International Studies
United States	Stacey R. Moy	Special agent of the counterintelligence department of the Washington office of the FBI (2010–2022)
United States	Trent R. Maul	Deputy Head of the Directorate of Intelligence Support of the Joint Staff of the Joint Staff of the CNS of the US Armed Forces (until 2021)
United States	Michael J. Morell	Former deputy director of the CIA, Senior Consultant at Beacon Global Strategies
United States	Tim Morrison	Former top U.S. adviser to President Trump on Russia and Europe on the White House National Security Council
United States	Leon Panetta	Former Secretary of Defense and Director of the CIA
United States	Thomas P. Pasquarello	Former US DEA Attaché at the US Embassy in Thailand
United States	Paul Miki Nakasone	Director of the US National Security Agency
United States	Augustus Leon Collins	Senior Executive Director of McEnergy Advisors
United States	Dina Powell	Employee of Goldman Sachs, former Deputy Assistant to the president of the United States for National Security
United States	Tony Perkins	Former member of USCIRF
United States	Mike Pompeo	Former US Secretary of State
United States	Karine Jean-Pierre	White House Press Secretary
United States	Erik Prince	Co-founder of private military companies Blackwater, Zee Service, Akedemi
United States	Susan Rice	Adviser to the president for Domestic Policy, former Permanent Representative to the UN and Assistant to the president for National Security
United States	Matthew Prince	CEO of Cloudflare
United States	Christopher G. Cavoli	Commander of United States European Command and Supreme Allied Commander Europe
United States	Jen Easterly	2nd Director of the Cybersecurity and Infrastructure Security Agency
United States	Kenneth Roth	Executive director of Human Rights Watch
United States	Mitt Romney	Republican senator for Utah
United States	Steve Daines	Republican senator for Oklahoma
United States	Jim Inhofe	Republican senator for Oklahoma
United States	Richard Burr	Republican senator for North Carolina
United States	John Hoeven	Republican senator for North Dakota
United States	Todd Young	Republican senator for Indiana
United States	Anne Applebaum	Journalist and writer
United States	John Bryant	President of Oshkosh Defense
United States	Richard Shelby	Republican senator for Alabama
United States	Mazie Hirono	Democratic senator for Hawaii
United States	John Hickenlooper	Democratic senator for Colorado
United States	Maggie Hassan	Democratic senator for New Hampshire
United States	Marsha Blackburn	Republican senator for Tennessee
United States	Josh Hawley	Republican senator for Missouri
United States	Ileana Ros-Lehtinen	Republican Congresswoman for Florida (1989–2019), Chairman of the Foreign Affairs Committee (2011–2013)
United States	Bob Corker	Republican senator for Tennessee in 2007–2019, Chairman of the Senate Foreign Affairs Committee (2015–2019)
United States	John Cornyn	Republican senator for Texas
United States	Marco Rubio	Republican senator for Florida
United States	John Boozman	Republican senator for Arkansas
United States	James Lankford	Republican senator for Oklahoma
United States	Rob Portman	Republican senator for Ohio
United States	Pat Roberts	Republican senator for Kansas (1997–2021)
United States	Susan Collins	Republican senator for Maine
United States	Chuck Grassley	Republican senator for Iowa
United States	Mitch McConnell	Republican senator for Kentucky
United States	Tom Cotton	Republican senator for Arkansas
United States	Cory Gardner	Former Republican senator for Colorado
United States	Susan Glasser	Journalist, news editor of The New Yorker
United States	Mark Heath Gleason	Head of the Bering Sea Crab Fishing Association, non-staff adviser to the US delegation to the Intergovernmental Fisheries Advisory Committee
United States	Richard Charles Vandiver	Former president Airtronic Systems
United States	Alberto Gonzales	Former US Attorney General (2005–2007)
United States	Charles Graner	Former member of the United States Army Reserve convicted of war crimes in connection with the 2003–2004 Abu Ghraib prisoner abuse scandal
United States	Steven L. Jordan	Former head of the Joint Interrogation Center for Prisoners at Abu Ghraib Special Prison
United States	Lynndie England	Former United States Army Reserve soldier prosecuted for mistreating detainees during the Abu Ghraib torture and prisoner abuse
United States	Stephen Dickson	Former Administrator of the Federal Aviation Administration
United States	Larry Diamond	American political sociologist and leading contemporary scholar in the field of democracy studies
United States	Jill Biden	First Lady of the United States
United States	Ashley Biden	Joe Biden's daughter
United States	Gina Raimondo	Secretary for Commerce
United States	Matthew S. Axelrod	Assistant Secretary for Commerce
United States	Thea D. Rozman Kendler	Assistant Secretary for Commerce
United States	Jeremy Pelter	Assistant Secretary for Commerce
United States	John Serafini	CEO of HawkEye 360
United States	Mark Kelly	Democratic senator for Arizona
United States	Kyrsten Sinema	Democratic senator for Arizona
United States	Tammy Baldwin	Democratic senator for Wisconsin
United States	Kevin Cramer	Republican senator for North Dakota
United States	Mike Rounds	Republican senator for South Dakota
United States	Rick Scott	Republican senator for Florida
United States	Pat Toomey	Former Republican senator for Pennsylvania
United States	Xavier Becerra	US Secretary of Health and Human Services
United States	Meta Platforms	American multinational technology conglomerate based in Menlo Park, California. Russia has added Facebook owner Meta to its list of extremist and terrorist organizations
United States	Sean Penn	Actor
United States	Ben Stiller	Actor
United States	W. Anthony Will	President and CEO of CF Industries
United States	Lester Crown	Businessman
United States	Jeffrey Sonnenfeld	Founder and CEO of Yale CELI
United States	Christopher Miller	Adjunct Professor at Fletcher School, Tufts University
United States	Jacob Nell	Former Chief Russia Economist and Head of European Economics at Morgan Stanley
United States	Jeanne Shaheen	Democratic senator for New Hampshire
United States	Joe Donnelly	Former Democratic senator for Indiana and United States Ambassador to the Holy See
United States	Jay Carney	Former White House Press Secretary
United States	Jeffrey Katzenberg	Co-founder of DreamWorks Pictures and DreamWorks Animation and former CEO
United States	Eric Cantor	Former House Majority Leader
United States	Michael D. Carvajal	Director of the Federal Bureau of Prisons
United States	Laura Jewett	Regional director for Eurasia at NDI
United States	Lindsey Graham	Republican senator for South Carolina
United States	Thom Tillis	Republican senator for North Carolina
United States	Ben Sasse	Republican senator for Nebraska
United States	Deb Fischer	Republican senator for Nebraska
United States	Kelly Ayotte	Republican senator for New Hampshire
United States	Annie Froehlich	special counsel at Cooley LLP, where she practices in the firm's export controls and economic sanctions group
United States	Benjamin L. Schmitt	Research Associate and Project Development Scientist at the Harvard-Smithsonian Center for Astrophysics
United States	Josh Earnest	Former White House Press Secretary and Vice President of United Airlines
United States	Tom Udall	US Ambassador to New Zealand, Democratic senator from New Mexico (2009–2021)
United States	Ryan Young	FBI Deputy Director for Intelligence
United States	Jeff Flake	US Ambassador to Turkey, Republican senator from Arizona (2013–2019)
United States	Bernard A. Harris Jr.	CEO of the National Math and Science Initiative and president and CEO of Vesalius Ventures, Inc.
United States	Victoria D. Harker	Executive Vice President and CFO of Tegna, Member of the Board of Directors of Exilem
United States	David Burritt	CEO of U.S. Steel
United States	Bruce M. Bodine	Senior Vice President of Mosaic
United States	Daniel P. Vajdich	Head of a lobbying firm "Yorktown Solutions"
United States	Lourenco C. Goncalves	CEO of Cliffs Natural Resources
United States	Mike Crapo	Republican senator for Idaho
United States	Roy Blunt	Republican senator for Missouri
United States	Ted Yoho	Former Republican Representative for Florida
United States	Ayanna Pressley	Member of House of Representative
United States	Ted Cruz	Republican senator for Texas
United States	Tim Murphy	Republican senator for Pennsylvania (2003–2017)
United States	Jim Risch	Republican senator for Idaho
United States	Shelley Moore Capito	Republican senator for West Virginia
United States	Bill Cassidy	Republican senator for Louisiana
United States	Mike Lee	Republican senator for Utah
United States	Cynthia Lummis	Republican senator for Wyoming
United States	Miguel Cardona	US Secretary of Education
United States	Anthony J. Cotton	Commander of US Air Force Global Strike Command
United States	Theodore Colbert III	CEO of Boeing Defense, Space & Security at The Boeing Company
United States	John Kennedy	Republican senator for Louisiana
United States	Roger Wicker	Republican senator for Mississippi
United States	Orrin Hatch (d. 2022)	Republican senator for Utah
United States	Brian Schatz	Democratic senator for Hawaii
United States	Derek J. Mitchell	President of NDI
United States	Alexander J. Motyl	Professor of Rutgers University
United States	Roger Wicker	Republican senator for Mississippi
United States	Jerry Moran	Republican senator for Kansas
United States	Lisa Murkowski	Republican senator for Mississippi
United States	Tanya F. Mayorkas	Wife of A. Mayorkas
United States	Christopher T. Metz	CEO of Defense Company Vista Outdoors
United States	Judy McCarthy	Wife of K. McCarthy
United States	Lisa Murray	Wife of J.McGovern
United States	Linda Mays McCaul	Wife of M. McCaul
United States	Cynthia Malkin	Wife of R. Blumenthal
United States	Catherine A. Holahan Murphy	Wife of C. Murphy
United States	Simone-Marie Meeks	Wife of G. Meeks
United States	Verne Martell	Husband of L. Murkowski
United States	Charlene D. Austin	Wife of L. Austin
United States	Helen Garrison Howell Wray	Wife of C. Wray
United States	Vicki Risch	Wife of J. Risch
United States	Bruce H. Mann	Husband of E. Warren
United States	Jeanette Dousdebes Rubio	Wife of M. Rubio
United States	Chris Krebs	1st Director of the Cybersecurity and Infrastructure Security Agency
United States	Jerome Powell	Chair of Federal reserve
United States	John W. Raymond	Former Commander of US Space Command
United States	Charles A. Richard	Commander of US Strategic Command
United States	David Petraeus	Former director of CIA
United States	Michael T. Plehn	President of US National Defense University
United States	Jeff Merkley	Democratic senator for Oregon
United States	Bernie Sanders	Independent Senator for Vermont
United States	Patty Murray	President pro tempore of the senate
United States	Alejandro Padilla	Democratic senator for California
United States	Jon Ossoff	Democratic senator for Georgia
United States	Gavin Newsom	Governor of California
United States	Tammy Duckworth	Democratic senator for Illinois
United States	Tammy Baldwin	Democratic senator for Wisconsin
United States	Tina Smith	Democratic senator for Minnesota
United States	Debbie Stabenow	Democratic senator for Michigan
United States	Jon Tester	Democratic senator for Montana
United States	Roger Marshall	Republican senator for Kansas
United States	Ben Ray Luján	Democratic senator for New Mexico
United States	Christopher Scolese	Director of the National Reconnaissance Office
United States	Tim Scott	Republican senator for South Carolina
United States	Ann Scott	Wife of R.Scott
United States	Alicia Day	Animal activist
United States	Tom Carper	Democratic senator for Delaware
United States	Cory Booker	Democratic senator for New Jersey
United States	Martin Heinrich	Democratic senator for New Mexico
United States	Kirsten Gillibrand	Democratic senator for New York
United States	Michael Bennet	Democratic senator for Colorado
United States	Raphael Warnock	Democratic senator for Georgia
United States	Elizabeth Warren	Democratic senator for Massachusetts
United States	Craig Kennedy	Lawyer at Davis Center for Russian and Eurasian Studies of Harvard University
United States	Brian Raduenz	CEO for AEVEX Aerospace
United States	Dan Sullivan	Republican senator for Alaska
United States	John Thune	Republican senator for South Dakota
United States	Tommy Tuberville	Republican senator for Alabama
United States	Cindy Hyde-Smith	Republican senator for Alabama
United States	Bill Hagerty	Republican senator for Tennessee
United States	Gretchen Whitmer	Governor of Michigan
United States	Marty Walsh	US Secretary of Labour
United States	Nancy Bass Wyden	Wife of Ron Wyden
United States	Kimberley Thune	Wife of John Thune
United States	Damon Wilson	Former Vice President of Atlantic Council and Current president and CEO of NED
United States	Michael Rubin	Senior fellow at the American Enterprise Institute (AEI)
United States	Martin J. Gruenberg	Chairman of the U.S. Federal Deposit Insurance Corporation (FDIC)
United States	Kenneth Wollack	Former president of NDI
United States	Daniel L. Jablonsky	President and CEO of Maxar Technologies
United States	Jed Willard	Director of Global Engagement at the Franklin Delano Roosevelt Foundation at Adams House, Harvard University
United States	Laura Rosenberger	Chair of the American Institute in Taiwan; former Senior Director for China and Taiwan at the White House National Security Council, former co-director of the Alliance for Securing Democracy at the German Marshall Fund, former foreign policy adviser at H. Clinton's campaign headquarters
United States	Yehuda Krinsky	Rabbi, secretary of "Agudas Chasidei Chabad"
United States	Shlomo Cunin	Rabbi, member of "Agudas Chasidei Chabad"
United States	Abraham Shemtov	Rabbi, Chairman of "Agudas Chasidei Chabad"
United States	Karen Kornbluh	Executive director of External Relations at Nielsen (2013–2017), former US Ambassador to the OECD (2009–2012)
United States	Christopher Wray	FBI Director
United States	Mike Rogers	US Representative
United States	Mark Warner	Democratic senator for Virginia
United States	Frank Waddell	Head of Northern Trust Fund
United States	Marillyn Hewson	CEO of Lockheed Martin
United States	Marcia Fudge	U.S. Secretary of Housing and Urban Development
United States	Chris Coons	Democratic senator for Delaware
United States	Jacklyn Sheryl Rosen	Democratic senator for Nevada
United States	Dianne Feinstein	Democratic senator for California
United States	Ron Wyden	Democratic senator for California
United States	Richard Blumenthal	Democratic senator for Connecticut
United States	Patrick Leahy	Former Democratic senator for Vermont
United States	Jack Lew	Former United States Secretary of the Treasury and co-chair of the Expert Working Group on Tightening US Sanctions Policy
United States	Maurice A. Myers	FBI Senior Deputy Director for Intelligence
United States	Nancy Cavallero McNamara	Head of the FBI Territorial Office for the District of Columbia (Washington) (until 2021)
United States	Michèle Flournoy	Former Under Secretary of Defense for Policy
United States	John Reed	Democratic senator for Rhode Island
United States	Chris Murphy	Democratic senator for Connecticut
United States	Tim Kaine	Democratic senator for Virginia, Vice President Candidate in H.Clinton Campaign
United States	Joni Ernst	Republican senator for Iowa
United States	Bill Nelson	Former Democratic senator for Florida, 14th Administrator of NASA
United States	Jeff Shell	Chairman of the Board of Broadcasting Governors, President of the Universal Film Entertainment Group
United States	Amy Klobuchar	Democratic senator for Minnesota
United States	Jacky Rosen	Democratic senator for Nevada
United States	Gerry Connolly	Democratic congressman for Virginia
United States	Charles Patrick Spencer	FBI Deputy Director of Foreign Operations
United States	Ricardo Sanchez	Former Commander-in-Chief of the US contingent in Iraq (2003–2004)
United States	Wesley D. Kremer	Vice-president of Raytheon and President of Raytheon Integrated Defense Systems (2015–2020)
United States	Michele G. Markoff	State Department Cyber Security Coordinator
United States	Robert S. Tully	U.S. Department of Justice Criminal Division officer
United States	Leon Fuerth	National Security Assistant to US Vice President A. Gore (until 2001)
United States	Maria Cantwell	Democratic senator for Washington
United States	Ed Markey	Democratic senator for Massachusetts
United States	Doug Klein	Expert of Atlantic Council
United States	Morgan Freeman	Actor, director, and narrator
United States	Avril Haines	Director of National Intelligence
United States	Steny Hoyer	Majority Leader of the United States House of Representatives
United States	Chuck Schumer	Majority Leader of the United States Senate
United States	Eliot Lance Engel	Former chair of the House Foreign Affairs Committee
United States	Michael Chertoff	Former United States Secretary of Homeland Security
United States	Gary Peters	Democratic senator for Michigan
United States	Catherine Marie Cortez Masto	Democratic senator for Nevada
United States	Chris Van Hollen	Democratic senator for Maryland
United States	Ben Cardin	Democratic senator for Maryland
United States	Sheldon Whitehouse	Democratic senator for Rhode Island
United States	Joe Manchin	Democratic senator for West Virginia
United States	Angus King	Independent Senator for Maine
United States	John Kasich	Former Republican governor of Ohio
United States	Marc Benioff	Co-founder, chairman and co-CEO of Salesforce
United States	Merrick Garland	US Attorney General
United States	Andrea Gacki	Director of the Office of Foreign Assets Control
United States	Chad Wolf	Former US Secretary of Homeland Security
United States	Alejandro Mayorkas	US Secretary of Homeland Security
United States	Carl Gershman	Former president of NED
United States	Mark Lagon	Former president of Freedom House
United States	Gary Bauer	Member of USCIRF
United States	Philip M. Breedlove	17th Supreme Allied Commander Europe of NATO Allied Command Operations
United States	Kenneth R. Weinstein	President of Hudson Institute
United States	Thomas A. Kennedy	Chairman of the board of directors and CEO of Raytheon Technologies (until April 2020)
United States	Taylor Lawrence	Vice-president of Raytheon, President of Raytheon Missile Systems (2012–2019)
United States	Joe Biden	46th President of the United States
United States	Kamala Harris	49th Vice President of the United States
United States	Doug Emhoff	Second Gentlemen of the United States
United States	John McCain (d. 2018)	Former ranking member of the Senate Committee on Armed Services
United States	Lloyd Austin	United States Secretary of Defence
United States	Mark Milley	Chairman of the Joint Chiefs of Staff
United States	Jake Sullivan	National Security Adviser
United States	Jen Psaki	White House Press Secretary
United States	Reta Jo Lewis	US Export-Import Bank President
United States	Wally Adeyemo	US Deputy Secretary of the Treasury
United States	Samantha Power	USAID Director
United States	Daleep Singh	Deputy national security adviser
United States	Lady Gaga	singer, songwriter, and actress
United States	Oprah Winfrey	talk show host
United States	Sylvia Garcia	Member of House of Representatives
United States	William Burns	CIA Director
United States	Kathleen Hicks	First Deputy Secretary of Defense
United States	Christopher Grady	Vice Chairman of the Joint Chiefs of Staff
United States	John Kirby	Deputy Secretary of Defense, official representative of the Department of Defense
United States	Ron Klain	White House Chief of Staff
United States	Ned Price	State Department Spokesman
United States	Rachel Levine	Deputy Minister of Health
United States	Mark Zuckerberg	Co-founder and head of the board of directors of Meta
United States	Brian Moynihan	Chairman and CEO of Bank of America
United States	Kathy Warden	President and CEO, Northrop Grumman Corporation
United States	Janet Yellen	US Treasury Secretary
United States	Jennifer Granholm	Energy Secretary
United States	Kate Bedingfield	White House Communications Director
United States	Shalanda Young	White House Budget Director
United States	Reed Hastings	CEO of Netflix
United States	Ed Bastian	CEO of Delta Air Lines
United States	Larry Fink	CEO of Black Rock
United States	Douglas Peterson	CEO of Standard & Poor's
United States	Adena Friedman	President and CEO of Nasdaq
United States	Rod Rosenstein	Deputy Attorney General of the United States (2017–2019)
United States	Neil Masterson	CEO of OneWeb
United States	Daniel L. Roderick	CEO of CrossRoads Energy Advisors, Chairman of the Board of Directors of Westinghouse Electric Corporation (2012–2016)
United States	Brian C. Rogers	Former CEO of T Rove Price
United States	Rob Fauber	President and CEO of Moody
United States	Peter Cramer	President, Universal Pictures
United States	Kelly Ortberg	Former chairman and CEO of Rockwell Collins
United States	Fredric G. Reynolds	Retired Executive Vice President and Chief Financial Officer, CBS Corporation
United States	Brett Hart	President, United Airlines
United States	Frank Ruben Jimenez	Senior Vice-president, General Electric Healthcare
United States	Gregory J. Hayes	Former chairman and CEO, United Technologies
United States	Lisa Su	President and CEO of AMD
United States	Stephen R. Wilson	Former Vice-president, Nabisco
United States	Chris Dodd	Former Senator
United States	Thomas Sullivan	Brother of Jake Sullivan
United States	Philip Bilden	Managing partner, Shield Capital
United States	John B. Bellinger III	Lobbyist; lawyer, Arnold & Porter
United States	Rahul Gupta	Director, Office of National Drug Control Policy
United States	Katherine Tai	Trade Representative
United States	Jeffrey Sprecher	New York Stock Exchange Chairman
United States	Paul Taylor	Fitch Group President and Chief Executive
United States	Phebe Novakovic	President of General Dynamics
United States	Michael Petters	President of Huntington Ingalls Industries
United States	William Brown	President of L-3 Harris Technologies
United States	Wahid Nawabi	President of Aerovironment
United States	Cayle Lan Oberwarth	Second Deputy Commander of the 1st US Army Corps, Fort Lews McChord, Brigadier General
United States	Louis M. Lapointe	Second Deputy Commander of the US Army in Alaska, Brigadier General
United States	Joseph Pierre Huet	Second Deputy Commander of the 18th Airborne Corps, US Army, Fort Bragg, Brigadier General
United States	Roger Krone	President of Leidos
United States	Horacio D. Rozanski	President of Booz Allen Hamilton
United States	David Deptula	Dean of the Mitchell Institute of Aerospace Power Studies
United States	Eileen Drake	President of Aerojet Rocketdyne
United States	Ryan Roslansky	CEO of LinkedIn
United States	George Stephanopoulos	ABC television host and former White House Communications Director
United States	Bianna Golodryga	Senior International Analyst at CNN
United States	Edward Acevedo	Former Illinois state representative, expert at the Wilson Center
United States	David Ignatius	Associate editor and columnist for The Washington Post
United States	Matthew Kroenig	Political scientist, author, national security strategist, and former CIA officer
United States	Hunter Biden	Son of Joe Biden
United States	Evan Ryan	Secretary of the president's Cabinet, wife of Secretary of State Antony Blinken
United States	Margaret Goodlander	Adviser to the Secretary of Justice, wife of Assistant to the president of the United States for National Security Jake Sullivan
United States	Robert Kagan	Political scientist, husband of Senior Deputy Secretary of State Victoria Nuland
United States	Mary Landrieu	Former Chairwoman of the Senate Committee on Energy and Natural Resources
United States	David Axelrod	Former senior advisor to the president of the United States, director of the "Politics Institute" at the University of Chicago
United States	Fred Eychaner	Chairman of Newsweb Corporation and LGBT activist

=== By Chechnya, against US and EU institutions' leaders ===
On 26 June 2014, the Head of the Russian republic of Chechnya, Ramzan Kadyrov, released a statement saying that he has created a sanction list which totaled four individuals. The people on the list have since been banned from entering the Chechen Republic and had all bank accounts frozen on 27 July 2014. This was in response to the EU sanctions.

State	Name	Position
United States	Barack Obama	Former president of the United States
European Union	Dame Catherine Ashton	Former High Representative of the Union for Foreign Affairs and Security Policy
European Union	José Manuel Barroso	Former president of the European Commission
European Union	Herman Van Rompuy	Former president of the European Council

== League overall timeline table ==
Country	Belarusian people and organisations sanctioned	Russian and Ukrainian people and organisations sanctioned	Other measures	Notes	Date
European Union, Albania, Iceland, Liechtenstein, Moldova, Norway, Ukraine, Montenegro and Kosovo		175			Before invasion
United States, Ukraine and Kosovo		258			Before invasion
Ukraine		1,400			Before invasion; overall (2018)
United States		44		First Package	21 February 2022—23 February 2022
Germany		1		First Package	22 February 2022
United Kingdom and British Overseas Territories		8	£20m of Russian holdings sold	First Package	22 February 2022—25 February 2022
Canada		353		First Package	22 February 2022—25 February 2022
European Union and Iceland		377		First Package	22 February 2022—25 February 2022
United Kingdom		100		Second Package	24 February 2022
United States	24	27		Second Package	24 February 2022
European Union and Greenland		98		Second Package	24 February 2022
Switzerland and North Macedonia		377		Second Package	24 February 2022
Canada		62		Second Package	27 February 2022
Singapore		8		Third Package	28 February 2022
United States		4		Third Package	28 February 2022
European Union		27		Third Package	28 February 2022
Norway, Monaco, Albania, North Macedonia			(same as European Union)	Third Package	28 February 2022
United Kingdom		2		Third Package	1 March 2022
Poland		2		Third Package	1 March 2022
United Kingdom	(unknown; all people and organisations related to Belarus' ministry of defence)			Third Package	2 March 2022
European Union		7		Third Package	2 March 2022
United States		22		Third Package	2 March 2022
Montenegro			(same as European Union)	Third Package	2 March 2022
Bermuda			(740 airplanes)	Third Package	2 March 2022
United States		101+		Third Package	3 March 2022
Andorra, Lichtenstein, Aruba			(same as European Union)	Third Package	3 March 2022
Canada		10		Third Package	3 March 2022
Guernsey, Jersey, Isle of Man			(same as Great Britain)	Third Package	4 March 2022
Antigua and Barbuda			(same as Great Britain and the USA)	Third Package	4 March 2022
European Union	(suspended 257 million euro programme)	(suspended 178 million euro programme)		Third Package	4 March 2022
Switzerland			Fullfies European Union's Third Package; sectoral limitations	Third Package	4 March 2022
Singapore		4		Third Package	5 March 2022
South Korea	(same as against Russia)			Third Package	6 March 2022
New Zealand		100		Third Package	7 March 2022
South Korea		1		Third Package	7 March 2022
Canada		10		Third Package	7 March 2022
Japan	44			Third Package	8 March 2022
European Union	4	160		Third+ Package	9 March 2022
United Kingdom		7		Third+ Package	10 March 2022
Japan	3			Third+ Package	10 March 2022
United Kingdom		386		Third+ Package	11 March 2022
Canada		37		Third+ Package	11 March 2022
United States		35		Third+ Package	11 March 2022
Australia		33		Third+ Package	14 March 2022
European Union		27		Fourth Package	15 March 2022
United States		11		Fourth Package	15 March 2022
United Kingdom		350		Fourth Package	15 March 2022
San Marino			(Same as European Union)	Fourth Package	15 March 2022
Canada		15		Fourth Package	15 March 2022
Switzerland		206		Fourth Package	16 March 2022
New Zealand		395		Fourth Package	17 March 2022
Canada		22		Fourth Package	17 March 2022
Australia		13		Fourth Package	18 March 2022
Japan		24		Fourth Package	18 March 2022
United Kingdom	59			Fourth Package	24 March 2022
United States		427		Fourth Package	24 March 2022
Canada		160		Fourth Package	24 March 2022
Latvia		25		Fourth Package	24 March 2022
Australia	2	22		Fourth Package	25 March 2022
Japan		106		Fourth Package	25 March 2022
United Kingdom		17		Fourth Package	31 March 2022
United States		13	21 companies in European countries	Fourth Package	31 March 2022
United States	24	96		Fourth Package	1 April 2022
Canada		9		Fifth Package	6 April 2022
United States		72		Fifth Package	6 April 2022
United Kingdom		10		Fifth Package	6 April 2022
Australia		67		Fifth Package	7 April 2022
United States		40		Fifth Package	7 April 2022
European Union		235		Fifth Package	8 April 2022
Japan		428		Fifth Package	8 April 2022
United Kingdom		4		Fifth Package	8 April 2022
Ukraine	Full Embargo for sales			Fifth Package	9 April 2022
European Union		20		Fifth Package	11 April 2022
Canada		33		Fifth Package	11 April 2022
United Kingdom		206 (including 1 Ukrainian citizen)		Fifth Package	13 April 2022
Australia		16		Fifth Package	14 April 2022
United Kingdom		2		Fifth Package	14 April 2022
Armenia			(Fullfies banking sanctions)	Fifth Package	16 April 2022
New Zealand		18		Fifth Package	19 April 2022
Canada		14		Fifth Package	19 April 2022
United Kingdom		26		Fifth Package	21 April 2022
Australia		147		Fifth Package	22 April 2022
Estonia		2		Fifth Package	25 April 2022
Poland		50		Fifth Package	26 April 2022
Canada		203		Fifth Package	27 April 2022
Kazakhstan		1			28 April 2022
New Zealand		176			1 May 2022
United Kingdom		63			4 May 2022
Australia		110			4 May 2022
Japan		140			5 May 2022
European Union		3		Sixth Package	6 May 2022
United States	2,620			Sixth Package	8 May 2022
Canada		65		Sixth Package	8 May 2022
Japan		200		Sixth Package	10 May 2022
New Zealand		8		Sixth Package	10 May 2022
Latvia		4		Sixth Package	12 May 2022
Japan		2		Sixth Package	12 May 2022
United Kingdom		3		Sixth Package	13 May 2022
Australia		1		Sixth Package	18 May 2022
United Kingdom		20		Sixth Package	19 May 2022
Canada		14		Sixth Package	20 May 2022

== See also ==
- Guantanamo List, the list of American officials barred from Russia
- Persona non grata (Russo-Ukrainian War)
