= Comparative navy officer ranks of Francophone countries =

Rank comparison chart of officers for navies of Francophone states.

== Officers ==
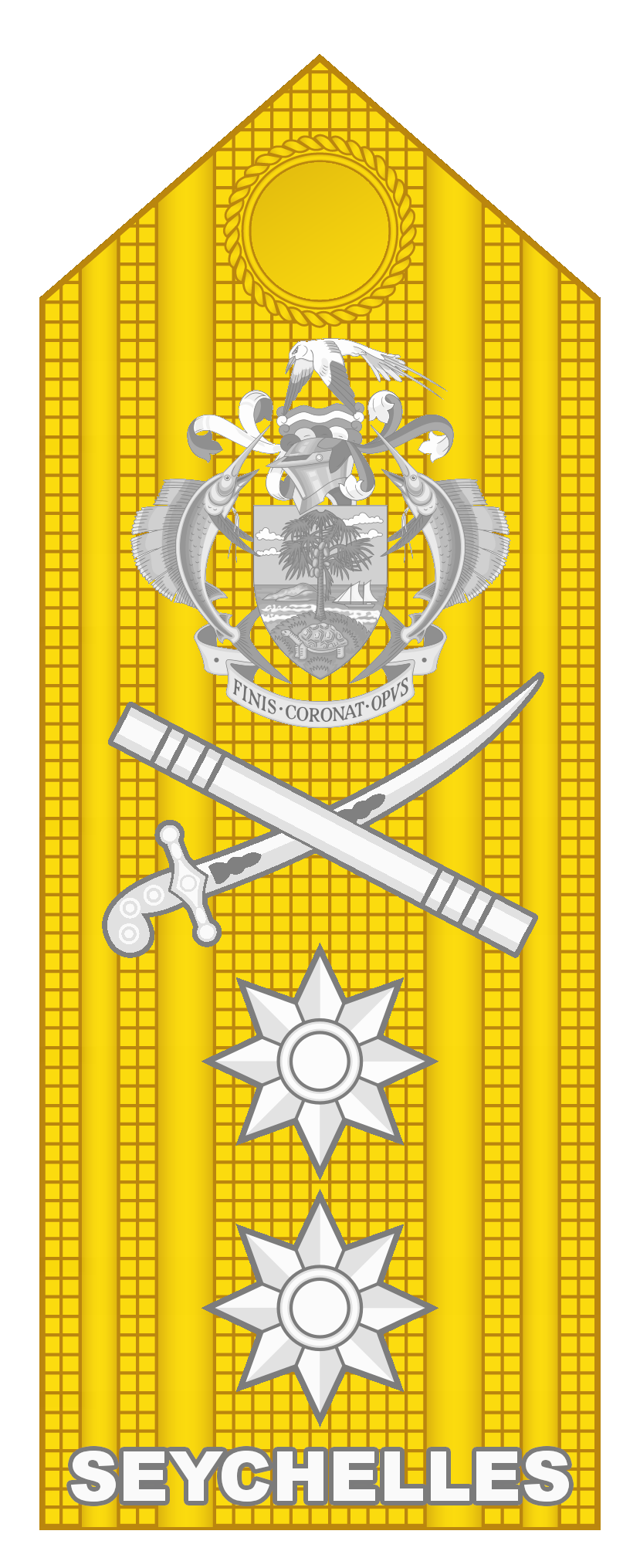
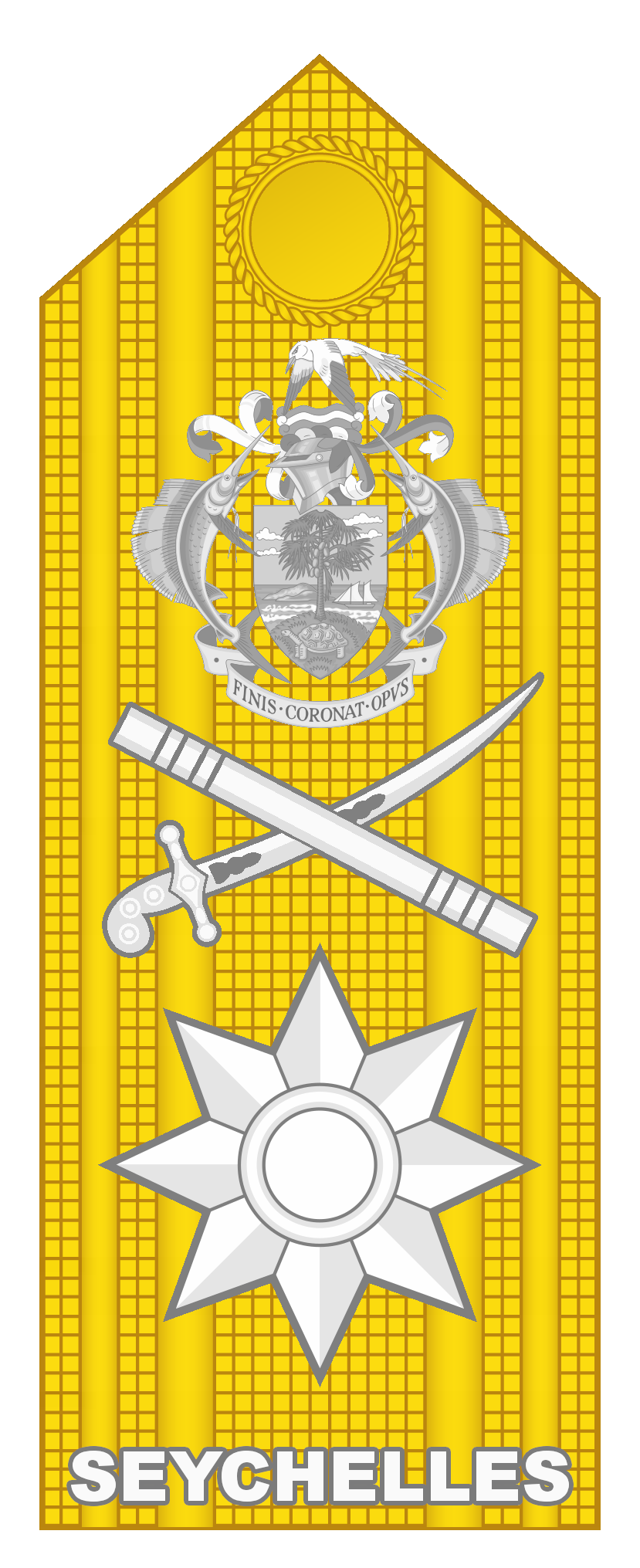
Rank group	General/flag officers					Senior officers					Junior officers
Belgian Navy
Belgian Navy		Admiraal	Vice-admiraal	Divisieadmiraal	Flottieljeadmiraal	Kapitein-ter-zee		Fregatkapitein	Korvetkapitein	Luitenant-ter-zee 1ste klasse	Luitenant-ter-zee	Vaandrig-ter-zee	Vaandrig-ter-zee 2de klasse
Belgian Navy		Amiral	Vice-amiral	Amiral de division	Amiral de flottille	Capitaine de vaisseau		Capitaine de frégate	Capitaine de corvette	Lieutenant de vaisseau de 1^{re} classe	Lieutenant de vaisseau	Enseigne de vaisseau	Enseigne de vaisseau de 2^{e} classe
Belgian Navy		Admiral	Vizeadmiral	Divisionsadmiral	Flotillenadmiral	Kapitän zur See		Fregattenkapitän	Korvettenkapitän	Linienschiffsleutnant 1. klasse	Linienschiffsleutnant	Seefahnrich	Seefahnrich 2. klasse
Benin Navy
Benin Navy		Amiral	Vice-amiral d'escadre	Vice-amiral	Contre-amiral	Capitaine de vaisseau		Capitaine de frégate	Capitaine de corvette		Lieutenant de vaisseau	Enseigne de vaisseau de 1^{ère} classe	Enseigne de vaisseau de 2^{ème} classe
Cameroon Navy
Cameroon Navy		Amiral d'escadre	Vice-amiral d'escadre	Vice-amiral	Contre-amiral	Capitaine de vaisseau		Capitaine de frégate	Capitaine de corvette		Lieutenant de vaisseau	Enseigne de vaisseau de 1^{re} classe	Enseigne de vaisseau de 2^{e} classe
Royal Canadian Navy
Royal Canadian Navy		Admiral	Vice-admiral	Rear-admiral	Commodore	Captain (N)		Commander	Lieutenant-commander		Lieutenant (N)	Sub-lieutenant	Acting sub-lieutenant
Royal Canadian Navy		Amiral(e)	Vice-amiral(e)	Contre-amiral(e)	Commodore	Capitaine de vaisseau		Capitaine de frégate	Capitaine de corvette		Lieutenant(e) de vaisseau	Enseigne de vaisseau de 1^{re} classe	Enseigne de vaisseau de 2^{e} classe
Comoros	No navy
Navy of the DR Congo
Navy of the DR Congo		Grand amiral	Amiral	Vice-amiral	Contre-amiral	Capitaine de vaisseau		Capitaine de frégate	Capitaine de corvette		Lieutenant de vaisseau	Enseigne de vaisseau	Enseigne de vaisseau de 2^{e} classe
Congolese Navy
Congolese Navy		Amiral	Vice-amiral d'escadre	Vice-amiral	Contre-amiral	Capitaine de vaisseau		Capitaine de frégate	Capitaine de corvette		Lieutenant de vaisseau	Enseigne de vaisseau de 1^{re} classe	Enseigne de vaisseau de 2^{e} classe
Djiboutian Navy
Djiboutian Navy					Général de brigade	Colonel-major	Colonel	Lieutenant-colonel	Commandant		Capitaine	Lieutenant	Sous-lieutenant
Navy of Equatorial Guinea
Navy of Equatorial Guinea				Vice almirante	Contra almirante	Capitán de navío		Capitán de fragata	Capitán de corbeta		Teniente de navío	Alférez de navío	Alférez de fragata
French Navy
French Navy	Amiral de France	Amiral	Vice-amiral d'escadre	Vice-amiral	Contre-amiral	Capitaine de vaisseau		Capitaine de frégate	Capitaine de corvette		Lieutenant de vaisseau	Enseigne de vaisseau de 1^{re} classe	Enseigne de vaisseau de 2^{e} classe
Gabonese Navy
Gabonese Navy		Amiral	Vice-amiral d'escadre	Vice-amiral	Contre-amiral	Capitaine de vaisseau		Capitaine de frégate	Capitaine de corvette		Lieutenant de vaisseau	Enseigne de vaisseau de 1^{re} classe	Enseigne de vaisseau de 2^{e} classe
Guinean Navy
Guinean Navy		Amiral de la Flotte	Vice-amiral d'escadre	Vice-amiral	Contre-amiral	Capitaine de vaisseau		Capitaine de frégate	Capitaine de corvette		Lieutenant de vaisseau	Enseigne de vaisseau de 1^{re} classe	Enseigne de vaisseau de 2^{e} classe
Haitian Navy
Navy of Ivory Coast
Navy of Ivory Coast		Amiral	Vice-amiral d'escadre	Vice-amiral	Contre-amiral	Capitaine de vaisseau major	Capitaine de vaisseau	Capitaine de frégate	Capitaine de corvette		Lieutenant de vaisseau	Enseigne de vaisseau de 1^{re} classe	Enseigne de vaisseau de 2^{e} classe
Madagascar Navy
Madagascar Navy		Amiral	Vice-amiral d'escadre	Vice-amiral	Contre-amiral	Capitaine de vaisseau		Capitaine de frégate	Capitaine de corvette		Lieutenant de vaisseau	Enseigne de vaisseau de 1^{re} classe	Enseigne de vaisseau de 2^{e} classe
Monaco	No navy
Royal Moroccan Navy
Royal Moroccan Navy		Amiral	Vice-amiral d'escadre	Vice-amiral	Contre-amiral	Capitaine de vaisseau-major	Capitaine de vaisseau	Capitaine de frégate	Capitaine de corvette		Lieutenant de vaisseau	Enseigne de vaisseau de 1^{re} classe	Enseigne de vaisseau de 2^{e} classe
Senegalese Navy
Senegalese Navy					Contre-amiral	Capitaine de vaisseau		Capitaine de frégate	Capitaine de corvette		Lieutenant de vaisseau	Enseigne de vaisseau de 1^{re} classe	Enseigne de vaisseau de 2^{e} classe
Seychelles Coast Guard
Seychelles Coast Guard				Major general (Note: Introduced December 2024)	Brigadier general	Colonel		Lieutenant colonel	Major		Captain	Lieutenant	Second lieutenant
Togolese Navy
Togolese Navy				Vice-amiral	Contre-amiral	Capitaine de vaisseau		Capitaine de frégate	Capitaine de corvette		Lieutenant de vaisseau	Enseigne de vaisseau de 1^{re} classe	Enseigne de vaisseau de 2^{e} classe
Vanuatu Maritime Wing
Vanuatu Maritime Wing								Commander; Komanda	Lieutenant commander Lietnen Komanda		Lieutenant; Lietnen	Sub lieutenant Sab-Lietnen
Rank group	General/flag officers					Senior officers					Junior officers
