= John Newton (Canadian admiral) =

Retired naval officer

Rear-Admiral John Frederick Newton CMM MSM CD
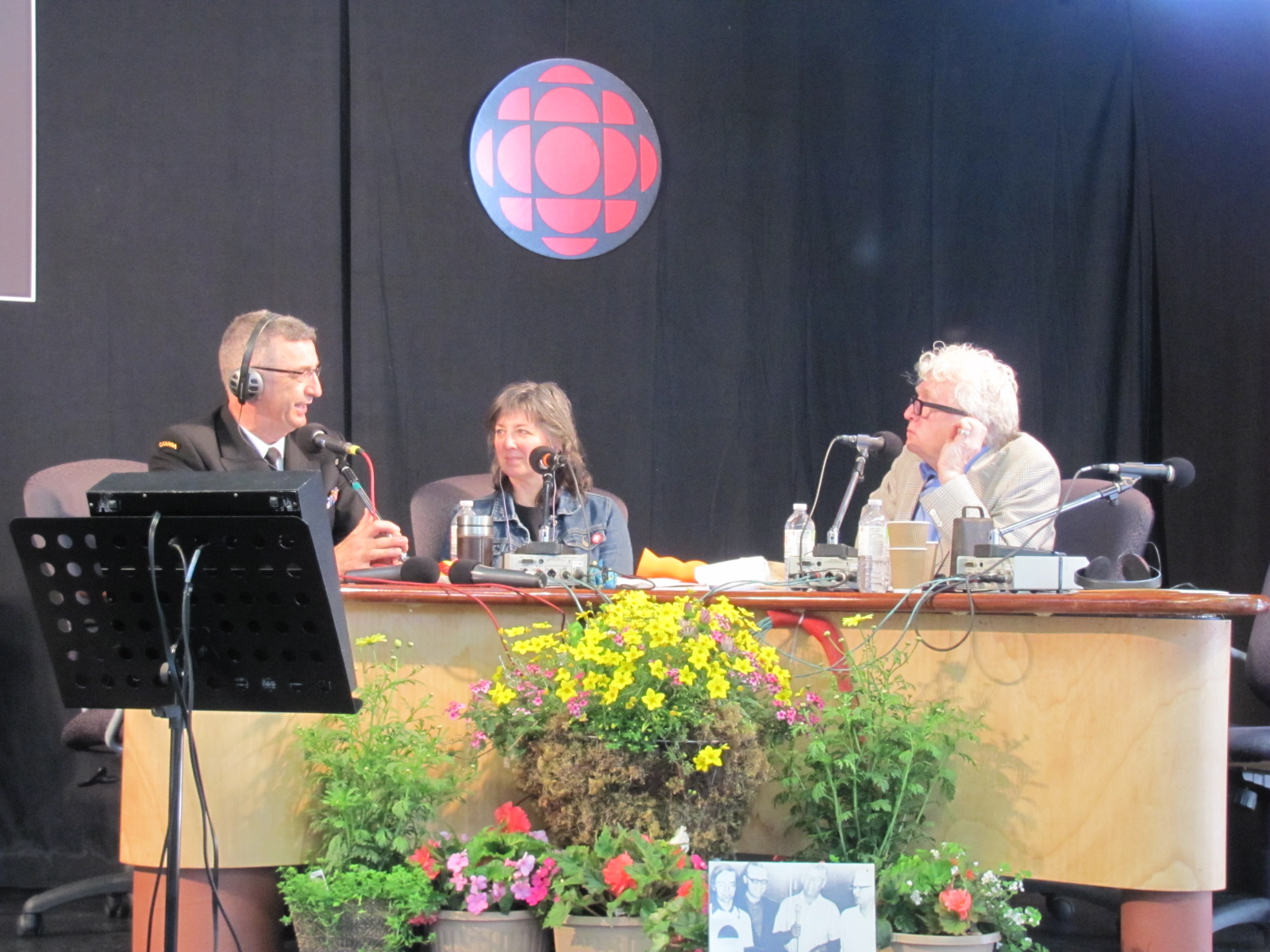
- Newton (left) being interviewed
- Born: c. 1959
- Military career
- Allegiance: Canada
- Branch: Royal Canadian Navy
- Service years: 1983–2018
- Rank: Rear-admiral
- Commands: Maritime Forces Atlantic; Canadian Forces Base Halifax; HMCS Fredericton
- Awards: Commander of the Order of Merit; Meritorious Service Medal; Canadian Forces' Decoration

Rear-Admiral John Frederick Newton CMM MSM CD is a retired Royal Canadian Navy officer and now liaison officer with Veterans Affairs Canada.

He joined the Navy in 1983 after graduating as a geologist from Dalhousie University. He commanded HMCS Fredericton from 2003 until 2006.

In 2008 he took command of Canadian Forces Base Halifax. In 2010 he was appointed director general of naval personnel and promoted to commodore.

He was appointed Commander Maritime Forces Atlantic in July 2013. In 2017 he took up a post as liaison officer with Veterans Affairs Canada.

On June 4, 2018, he retired from the Canadian Armed Forces.

== Awards and decorations ==
Newton's personal awards and decorations include the following:

Ribbon	Description	Notes
	Order of Military Merit (CMM)	Appointed Commander (CMM) on 23 October 2015; Appointed Officer (OMM) on 21 September 2006
	Meritorious Service Medal (MSM)	Decoration awarded on 14 July 2011; Military division
	Gulf and Kuwait Medal	with Clasp 1991
	Special Service Medal	with NATO-OTAN Clasp
	Canadian Peacekeeping Service Medal	
	NATO Medal for the former Yugoslavia	with FORMER YUGOSLAVIA Clasp
	Canadian Forces' Decoration (CD)	with two Clasp for 32 years of services

CDS Commendation
Command Commendation

Military offices
Preceded by Dave Gardam	Commander Maritime Forces Atlantic; 2013-2017	Succeeded by Craig Baines
