= Hawco =

Hawco may refer to:

- Allan Hawco (born 1977), Canadian actor and producer
- Darren Hawco, officer in the Royal Canadian Navy
- Matthew E. Hawco (1882–1962), Canadian engineer, magistrate and politician
- Sherry Hawco (1964–1991), Canadian artistic gymnast
