= Comparative navy officer ranks of Anglophone countries =

Rank comparison chart of officers for navies of Anglophone states.

== Officers ==
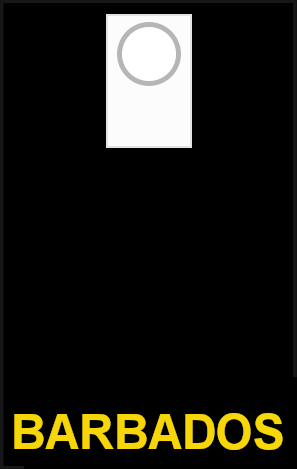
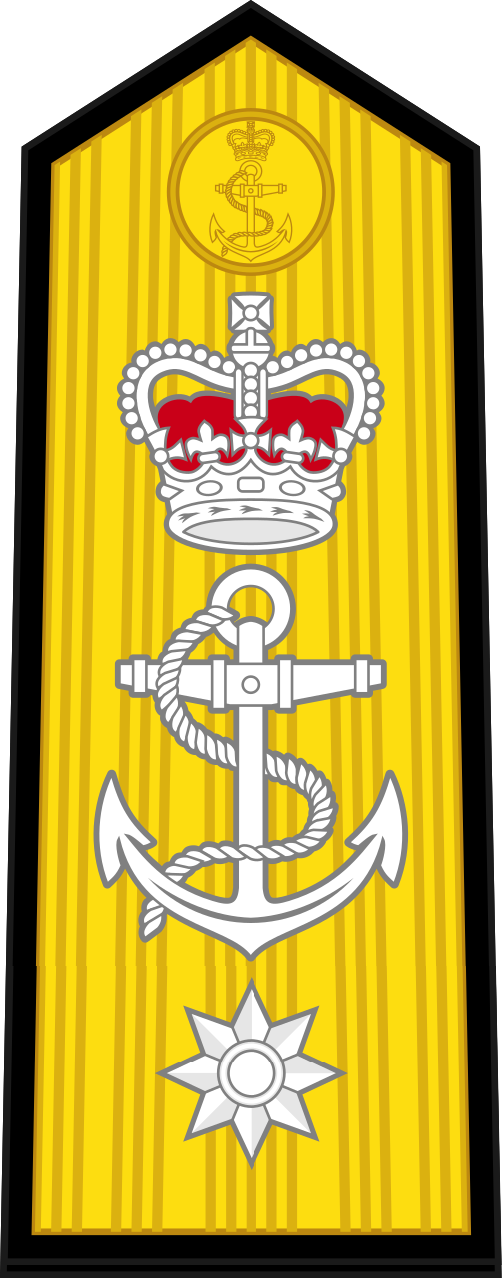
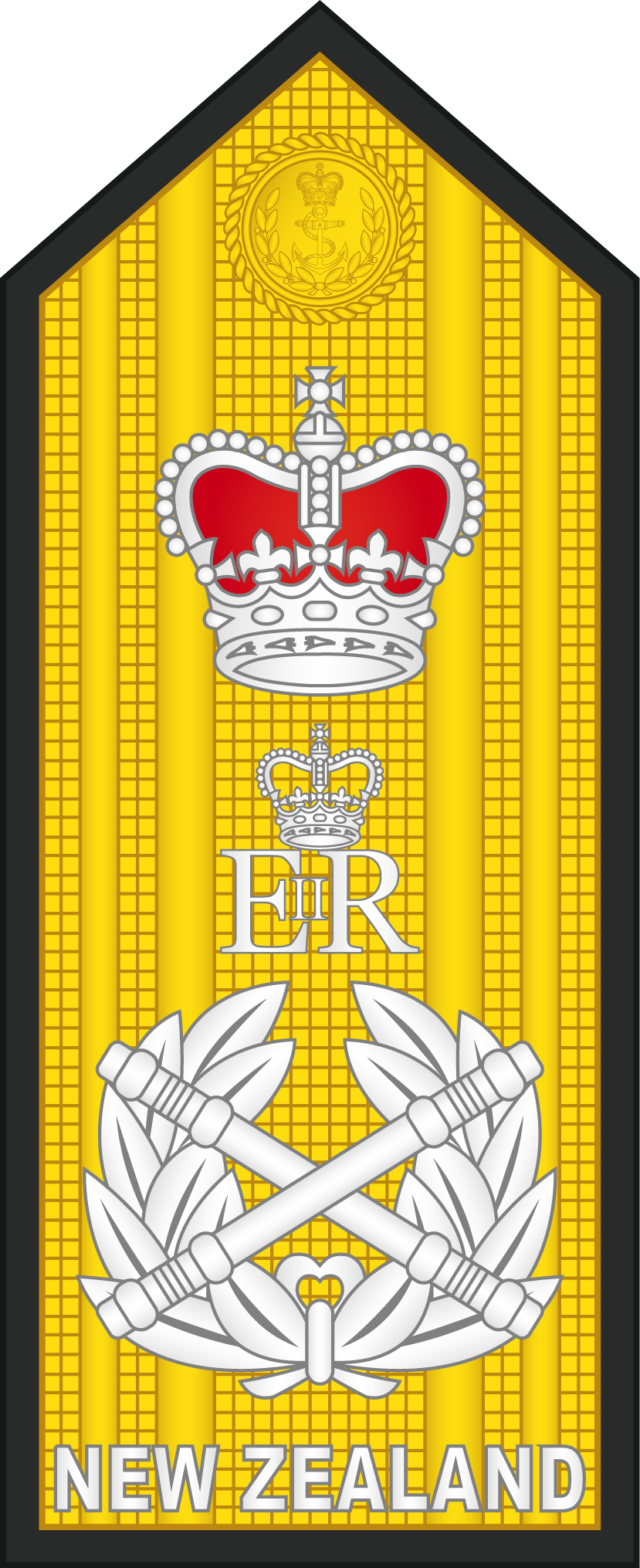
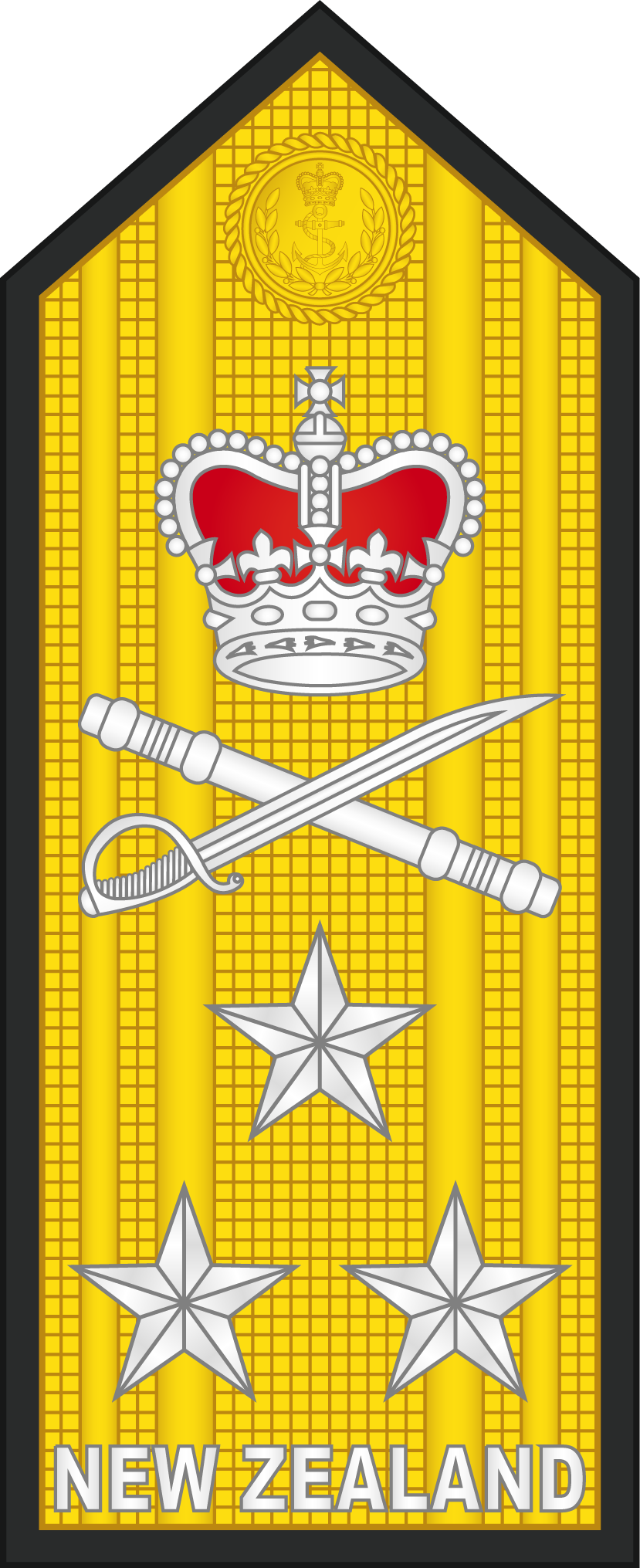
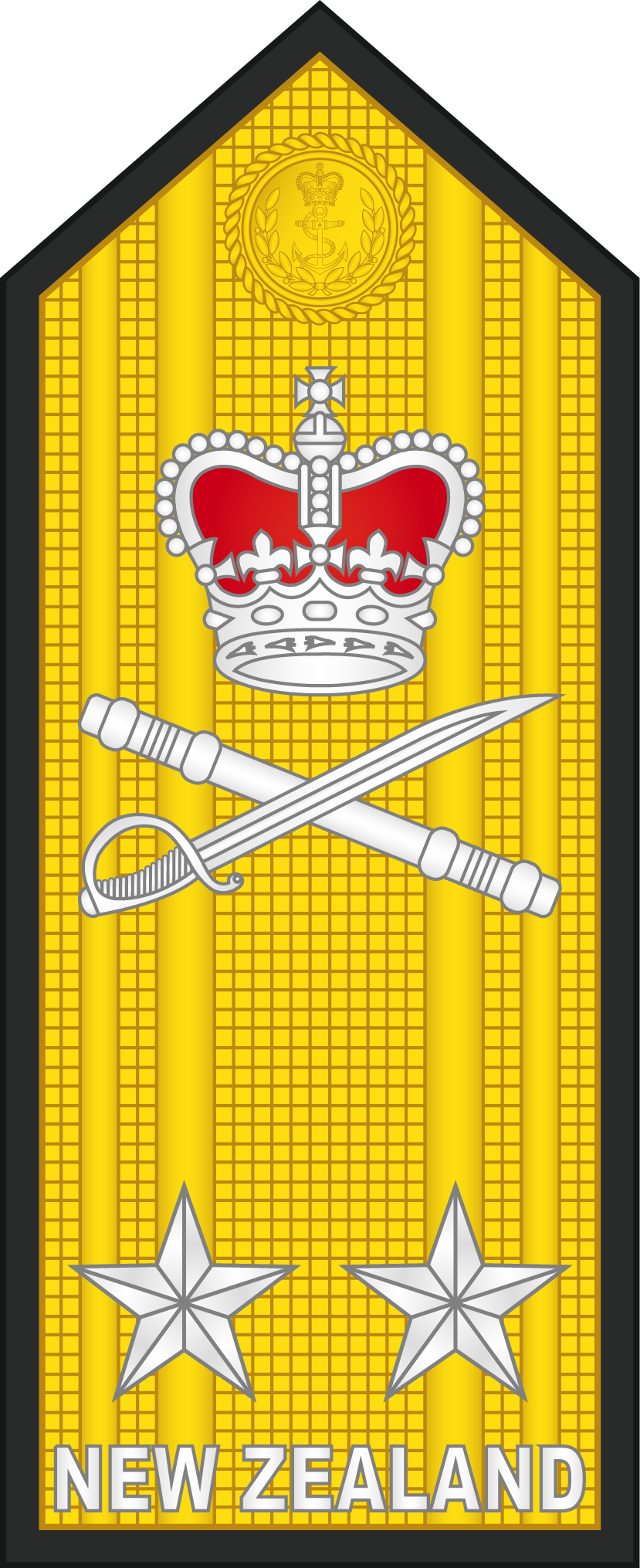
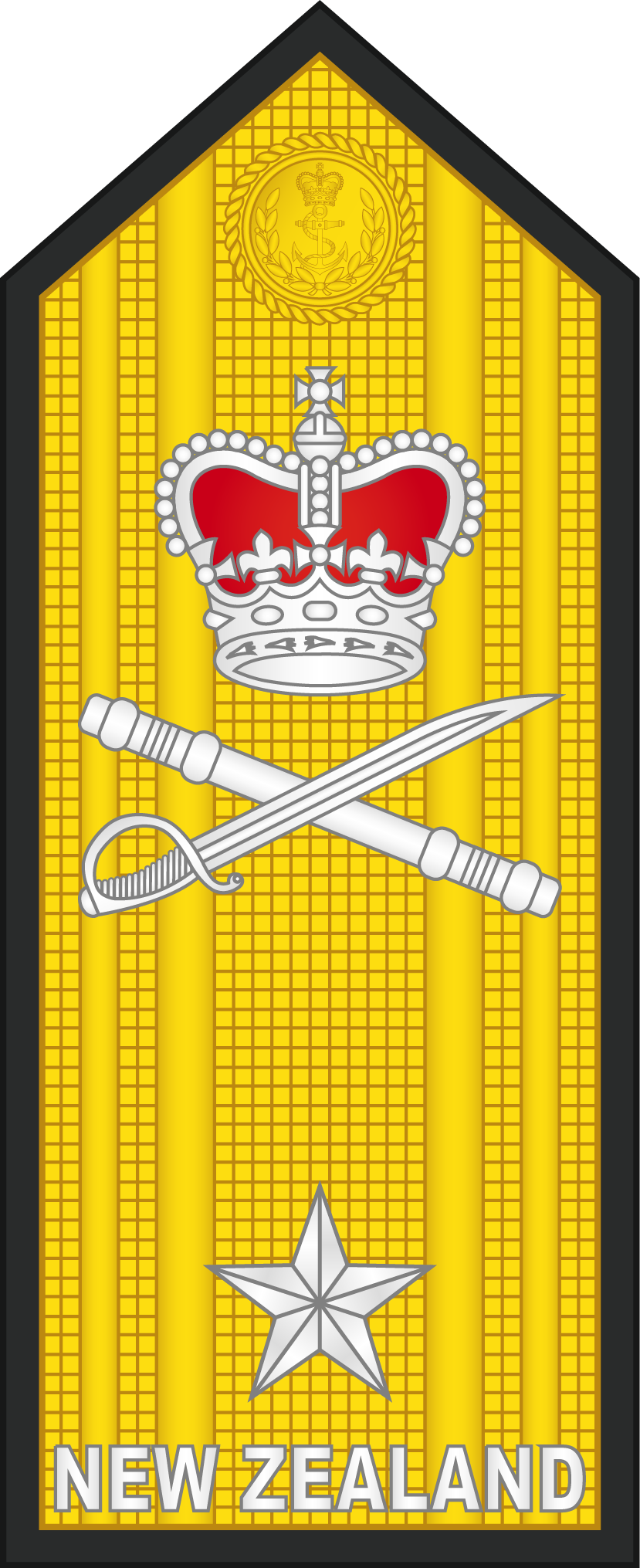
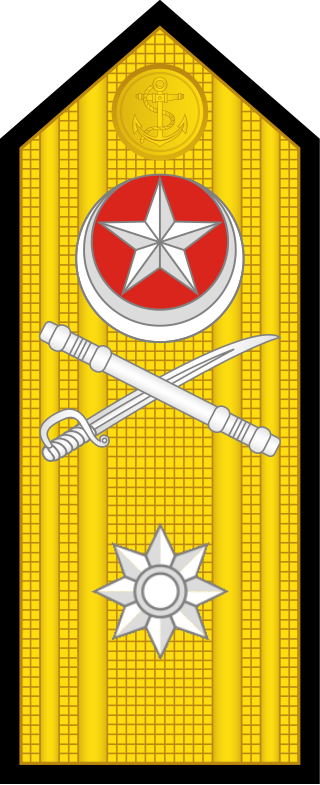
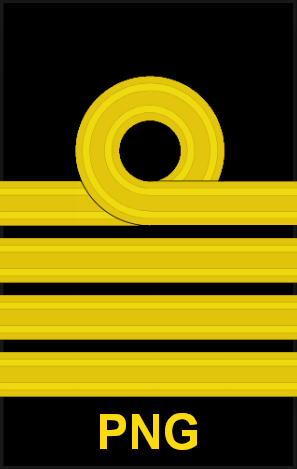
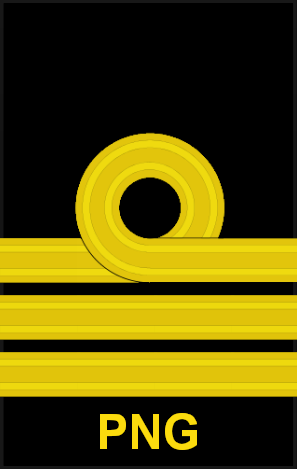
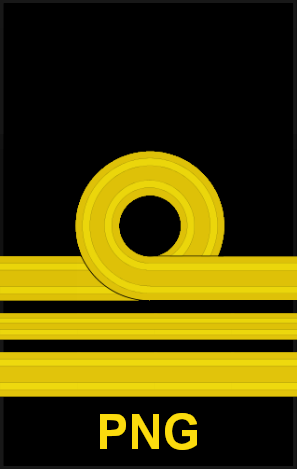
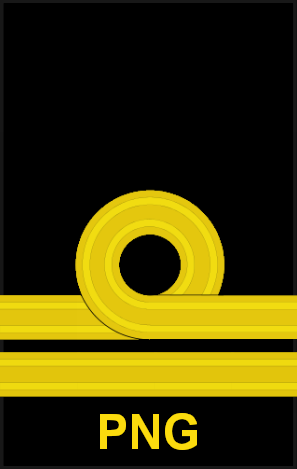
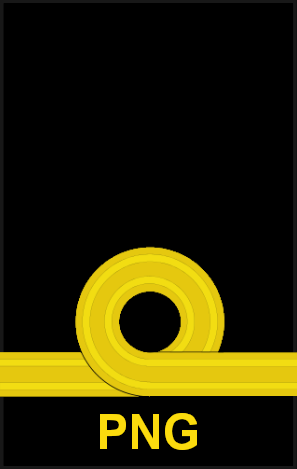
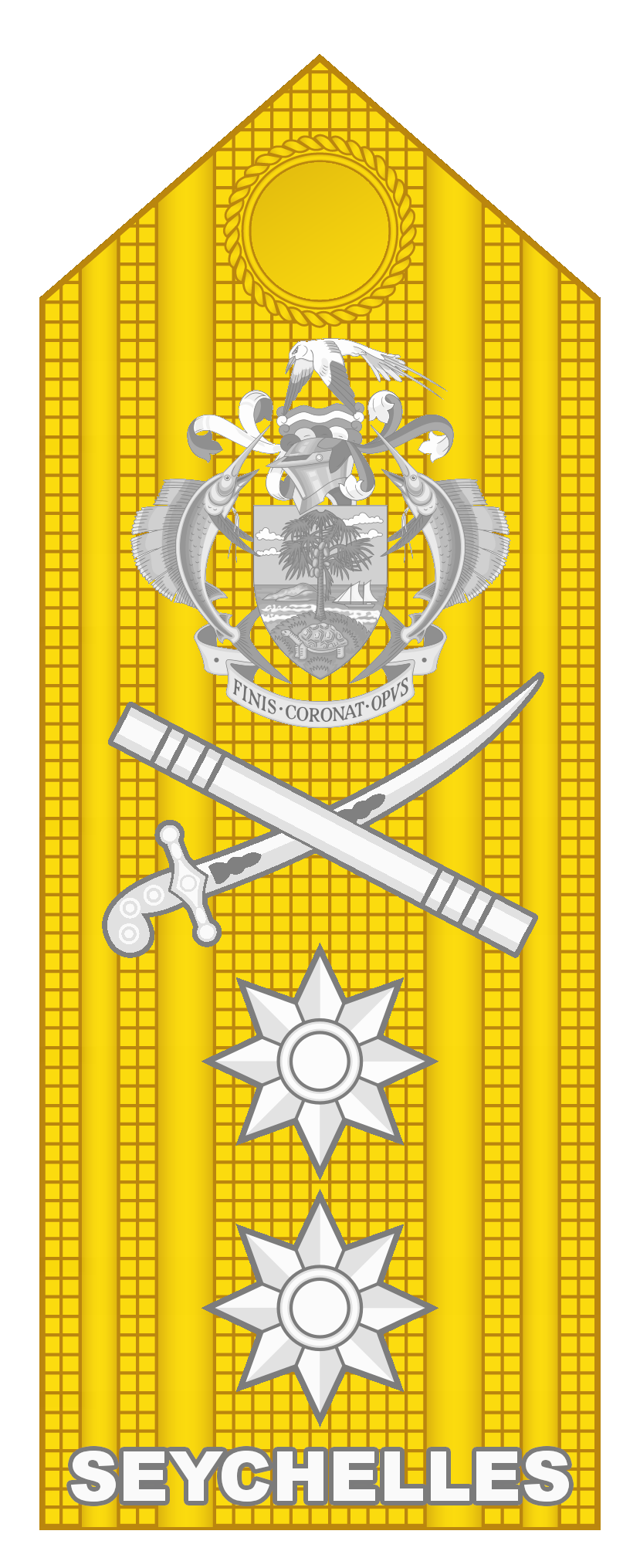
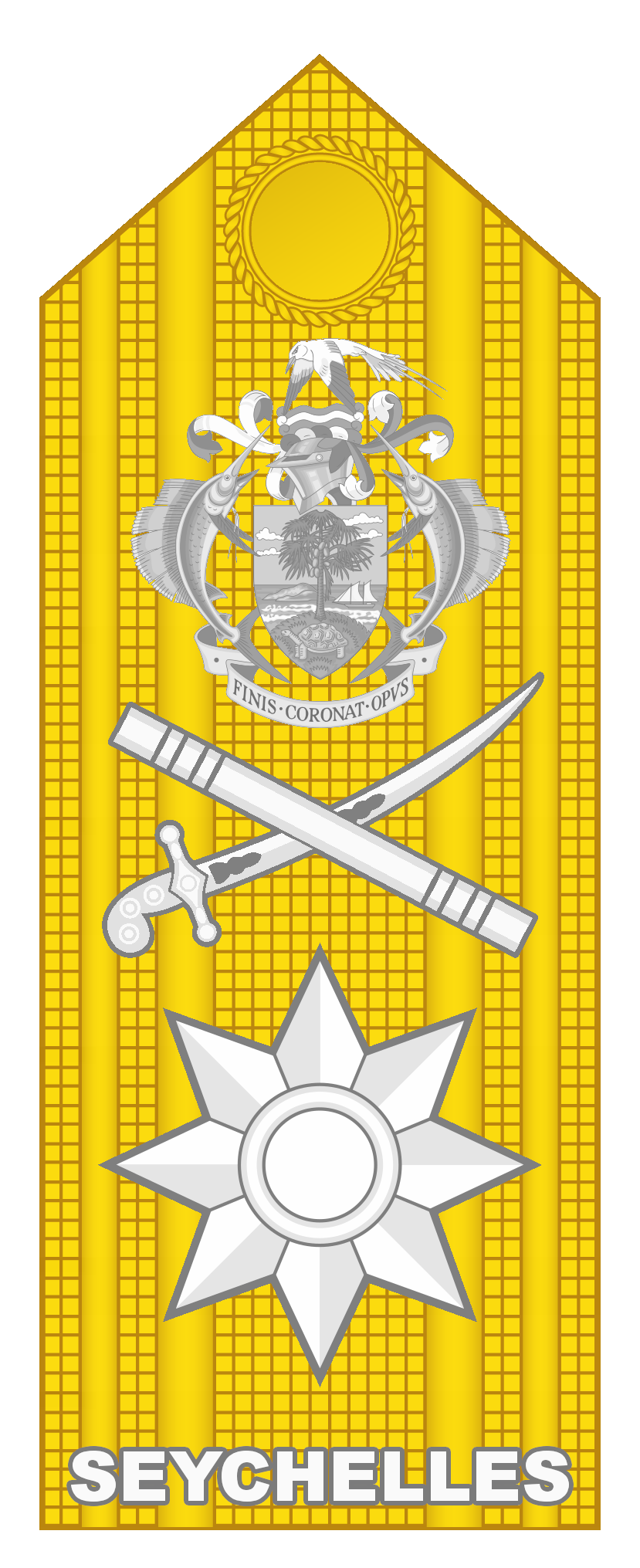
Rank group	General/flag officers					Senior officers				Junior officers
Antigua and Barbuda Coast Guard
Antigua and Barbuda Coast Guard						Captain	Commander		Lieutenant commander	Lieutenant		Lieutenant (junior grade)	Sub-lieutenant
Royal Australian Navy
Royal Australian Navy	Admiral of the fleet	Admiral	Vice admiral	Rear admiral	Commodore	Captain	Commander		Lieutenant commander	Lieutenant		Sub lieutenant	Acting sub lieutenant
Royal Bahamas Defence Force
Royal Bahamas Defence Force					Commodore	Captain	Senior commander	Commander	Lieutenant commander	Senior lieutenant	Lieutenant	Sub-lieutenant	Acting sub-lieutenant
Barbados Coast Guard
Barbados Coast Guard					Commodore		Commander		Lieutenant commander	Lieutenant		Sub lieutenant	Midshipman
Belize Coast Guard
Belize Coast Guard				Rear admiral	Rear admiral (lower half)	Captain	Commander		Lieutenant commander	Lieutenant		Lieutenant (junior grade)	Ensign
Botswana	No navy
Burundi	No navy
Cameroon Navy
Cameroon Navy		Amiral d'escadre	Vice-amiral d'escadre	Vice-amiral	Contre-amiral	Capitaine de vaisseau	Capitaine de frégate		Capitaine de corvette	Lieutenant de vaisseau		Enseigne de vaisseau de 1^{re} classe	Enseigne de vaisseau de 2^{e} classe
Royal Canadian Navy
Royal Canadian Navy		Admiral	Vice-admiral	Rear-admiral	Commodore	Captain (N)	Commander		Lieutenant-commander	Lieutenant (N)		Sub-lieutenant	Acting sub-lieutenant
Royal Canadian Navy		Amiral(e)	Vice-amiral(e)	Contre-amiral(e)	Commodore	Capitaine de vaisseau	Capitaine de frégate		Capitaine de corvette	Lieutenant(e) de vaisseau		Enseigne de vaisseau de 1^{re} classe	Enseigne de vaisseau de 2^{e} classe
Dominica	No navy
Eswatini	No navy
Republic of Fiji Navy
Republic of Fiji Navy				Rear admiral	Commodore	Captain	Commander		Lieutenant commander	Lieutenant		Sub-Lieutenant	Ensign
Gambian Navy
Gambian Navy			Vice admiral	Rear admiral	Commodore	Captain	Commander		Lieutenant commander	Lieutenant		Lieutenant (junior grade)	Sub-lieutenant
Ghana Navy
Ghana Navy		Admiral	Vice admiral	Rear admiral	Commodore	Captain	Commander		Lieutenant commander	Lieutenant		Sub lieutenant
Grenada	No navy
Guyana Coast Guard
Guyana Coast Guard				Rear admiral	Commodore	Captain	Commander		Lieutenant commander	Lieutenant		Lieutenant junior grade	Sub-lieutenant
Haitian Navy
Indian Navy
Indian Navy		Admiral एडमिरल	Vice admiral वाइस एडमिरल	Rear admiral रियर एडमिरल	Commodore कमोडोर	Captain कैप्टन	Commander कमांडर		Lieutenant commander लेफ़्टिनेंट कमांडर	Lieutenant लेफ्टिनेंट		Sub-lieutenant सब लेफ्टिनेंट	Midshipman मिडशिपमैन
Irish Naval Service
Irish Naval Service			Vice admiral	Rear admiral	Commodore	Captain	Commander		Lieutenant commander	Lieutenant		Sub-lieutenant	Ensign
Irish Naval Service			Leas-aimiréal	Seach-aimiréal	Ceannasóir	Captaen	Ceannasaí		Lefteanant-cheannasaí	Lefteanant		Fo-lefteanant	Meirgire
Jamaican Coast Guard
Jamaican Coast Guard			Vice admiral	Rear admiral	Commodore	Captain	Commander		Lieutenant commander	Lieutenant		Lieutenant (junior grade)	Sub-lieutenant
Kenya Navy
Kenya Navy		General	Lieutenant general	Major general	Brigadier	Colonel	Lieutenant colonel		Major	Captain		Lieutenant	Second lieutenant
Kiribati	No navy
Lesotho	No navy
Liberian National Coast Guard
Liberian National Coast Guard						Captain	Commander		Lieutenant commander	Lieutenant		Lieutenant (junior grade)	Ensign
Malawi Navy
Malawi Navy		General	Lieutenant general	Major general	Brigadier general	Colonel	Lieutenant colonel		Major	Captain		First lieutenant	Second lieutenant
Maritime Squadron of Malta
Maritime Squadron of Malta					Brigadier; Brigadier	Colonel; Kurunell	Lieutenant colonel Logutenent kurunell		Major; Maġġur	Captain; Kaptan		Lieutenant; Logutenent	Second lieutenant Sekond logutenent
Marshall Islands	No navy
Mauritius	No navy
Federated States of Micronesia	No navy
Namibian Navy
Namibian Navy		Admiral	Vice admiral	Rear admiral	Rear admiral junior grade	Captain	Commander		Lieutenant commander	Lieutenant		Lieutenant junior grade	Ensign
Nauru	No navy
Royal New Zealand Navy
Royal New Zealand Navy	Admiral of the fleet		Vice admiral	Rear admiral	Commodore	Captain	Commander		Lieutenant commander	Lieutenant		Sub lieutenant	Ensign
Nigerian Navy
Nigerian Navy	Admiral of the Fleet	Admiral	Vice admiral	Rear admiral	Commodore	Captain	Commander		Lieutenant commander	Lieutenant		Sub-Lieutenant	Midshipman
Pakistan Navy
Pakistan Navy		Admiral ایڈمرل	Vice admiral وائس ایڈمرل	Rear admiral بحریہ کا امیر	Commodore کموڈور	Captain کپتان	Commander کمانڈر		Lieutenant commander لیفٹیننٹ کمانڈر	Lieutenant لیفٹیننٹ		Sub-lieutenant سب لیفٹیننٹ	Midshipman مڈ شپ مین
Palau	No navy
Papua New Guinea Maritime Element
Papua New Guinea Maritime Element				Rear Admiral	Commodore	Captain	Commander		Lieutenant; Commander	Lieutenant		Sub; Lieutenant
Philippine Navy
Philippine Navy		Admiral	Vice admiral	Rear admiral	Commodore	Captain	Commander		Lieutenant commander	Lieutenant		Lieutenant junior grade	Ensign
Rwanda	No navy
Saint Kitts and Nevis Coast Guard
Saint Kitts and Nevis Coast Guard							Commander		Lieutenant Commander	Lieutenant		Sub-Lieutenant	Midshipman
Saint Lucia	No navy
Saint Vincent and the Grenadines	No navy
Samoa	No navy
Seychelles Coast Guard
Seychelles Coast Guard				Major general (Note: Introduced December 2024)	Brigadier general	Colonel	Lieutenant colonel		Major	Captain		Lieutenant	Second lieutenant
Sierra Leone Navy
Sierra Leone Navy				Rear admiral	Commodore	Captain	Commander		Lieutenant commander	Lieutenant		Lieutenant (junior grade)	Sub-Lieutenant
Republic of Singapore Navy		No insignia yet
Republic of Singapore Navy		Admiral	Vice admiral	Rear admiral	Rear admiral (junior grade)	Colonel	Senior lieutenant colonel	Lieutenant colonel	Major	Captain		Lieutenant	Second lieutenant
Solomon Islands	No navy
South African Navy
South African Navy		Admiral	Vice admiral	Rear admiral	Rear admiral (junior grade)	Captain	Commander		Lieutenant commander	Lieutenant		Sub lieutenant	Ensign
South Sudan	No navy
Sudanese Navy
Sudanese Navy	مشیر; Mushir	فريق أول; Fariq 'awal	فريق; Fariq	لواء; Liwa	عميد; Amid	عقيد; Aqid	مقدم; Muqaddam		رائد; Ra'id	نقيب; Naqib		ملازم أول; Mulazim awwal	ملازم; Mulazim
Tanzania Naval Command
Tanzania Naval Command			Vice admiral	Rear admiral	Commodore	Captain	Commander		Lieutenant commander	Lieutenant		Sub lieutenant	Ensign
Tongan Navy
Tongan Navy					Commodore	Captain	Commander		Lieutenant commander	Lieutenant		Sub lieutenant	Midshipman
Trinidad and Tobago Coast Guard
Trinidad and Tobago Coast Guard				Rear admiral	Commodore	Captain	Commander		Lieutenant commander	Lieutenant		Sub-lieutenant	Acting sub-lieutenant
Tuvalu	No navy
Uganda	No navy
Royal Navy
Royal Navy	Admiral of the Fleet	Admiral	Vice admiral	Rear admiral	Commodore	Captain	Commander		Lieutenant commander	Lieutenant		Sub lieutenant	Midshipman
United States Navy
United States Navy	Fleet admiral	Admiral	Vice admiral	Rear admiral	Rear admiral (lower half)	Captain	Commander		Lieutenant commander	Lieutenant		Lieutenant (junior grade)	Ensign
Vanuatu Maritime Wing
Vanuatu Maritime Wing							Commander; Komanda		Lieutenant commander Lietnen Komanda	Lieutenant; Lietnen		Sub lieutenant Sab-Lietnen
Zambia	No navy
Zimbabwe	No navy
Rank group	General/flag officers					Senior officers				Junior officers
