= Admiral McDonald =

Admiral McDonald may refer to:

- Art McDonald (admiral) (born 1967), Royal Canadian Navy admiral
- David L. McDonald (1906–1997), U.S. Navy admiral
- Wesley L. McDonald (1924–2009), U.S. Navy admiral

== See also ==
- Edward Orrick McDonnell (1891–1960), U.S. Navy vice admiral
