= Art McDonald =

Art McDonald may refer to:

- Arthur B. McDonald (born 1943), Canadian astrophysicist
- Art McDonald (admiral), officer in the Royal Canadian Navy
