= Scott Bishop =

Royal Canadian Navy officer

Scott Bishop CMM CD
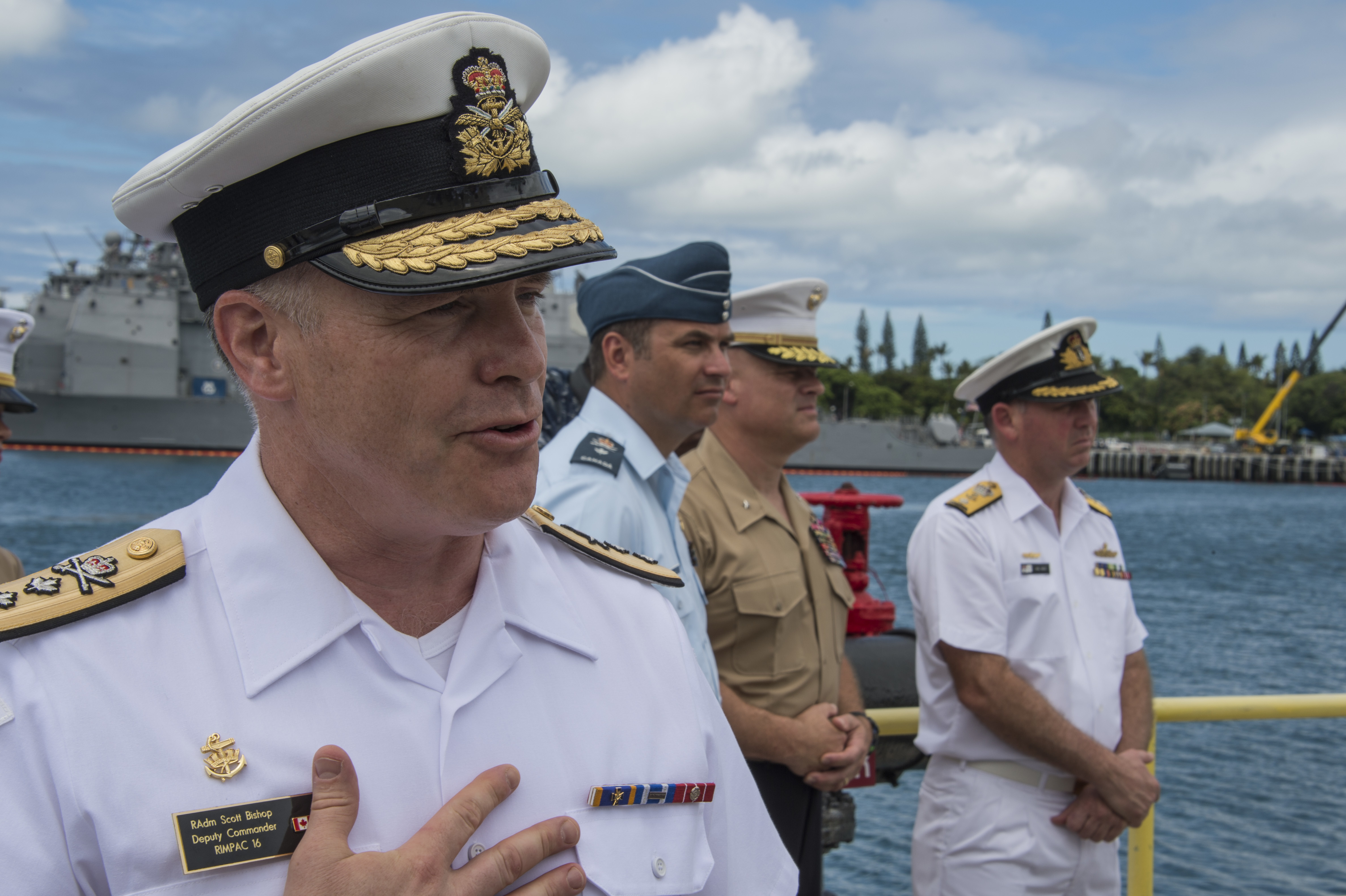
- Bishop as a Rear Admiral in 2016
- Born: Vancouver, British Columbia, Canada
- Military career
- Allegiance: Canada
- Branch: Royal Canadian Navy
- Service years: 1983 – Present
- Rank: Vice Admiral
- Commands: NATO Military Representative; Canadian Forces Intelligence Command; Canadian Fleet Atlantic; Canadian Fleet Pacific; Maritime Operations Group Five; HMCS Athabaskan; HMCS Halifax
- Awards: Commander of the Order of Military Merit; Canadian Forces' Decoration

Scott Edward George Bishop CMM CD is a Canadian naval flag officer serving as a Vice Admiral in the Royal Canadian Navy. He presently serves as Canada's Military Representative to the NATO Military Committee, and was commander of the Canadian Forces Intelligence Command from 2016 to 2021.

== Background ==
Bishop joined the Royal Canadian Naval Reserve in 1983 before joining the Regular Force in 1985. His first regular post was as a bridge watch-keeping officer on HMCS Restigouche. Bishop specialized in navigation, and served as the Navigating Officer in Royal Canadian Naval ships Chignecto, Miramichi, Qu'appelle, and Provider. He was also the Senior Navigation Instructor at the Naval Officer Training Centre. In 1995, Bishop was promoted to the rank of Lieutenant-Commander and posted to HMCS Vancouver as the ship's Combat Officer. In 2000, he was appointed Executive Officer of HMCS Athabaskan. He was selected to command the frigate HMCS Halifax in 2005.

He holds a Bachelor of Business Administration and Master of Business Administration, and is a graduate of the United States Naval War College.

== Staff career ==
Bishop served as the Commander of Maritime Operations Group Five, the Commander Canadian Fleet Pacific in August 2012 and the Commander Canadian Fleet Atlantic in 2013.

He was the Director General for International Security Policy from July 2015 until assuming command of the Canadian Forces Intelligence Command in June 2016, which he led for five years.

In 2021, upon the appointment of Lieutenant General Frances J. Allen as Vice Chief of the Defence Staff, he was promoted to Vice Admiral and appointed Canada's NATO Military Representative. He presented his credentials to NATO Secretary-General Jens Stoltenberg and Chairman of the NATO Military Committee Chairman, Admiral Rob Bauer, in June 2021.

== Awards and decorations ==
Bishop's personal awards and decorations include the following:

Ribbon	Description	Notes
	Order of Military Merit (CMM)	Appointed Commander (CMM) on 22 September 2016; Appointed Officer (OMM) on 27 October 2010
	Special Service Medal	NATO-OTAN clasp
	NATO Medal with 'OUP-LIBYA/LIBYE'	For service in Operation Unified Protector.
	Canadian Forces' Decoration (CD)	with three Clasp for 42 years of service

CDS Commendation (16 October 2013)
CDS Commendation (6 November 2019)

Military offices
Preceded by Peter Ellis	Commander Canadian Fleet Pacific; August 2012–July 2013	Succeeded by Bob Auchterlonie
Preceded by Darren Hawco	Commander Canadian Fleet Atlantic; 2013–2014	Succeeded by Craig Baines
