= Craig Baines =

Royal Canadian Navy officer

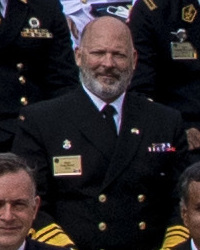
- Baines in 2021
- Born: c. 1960s Saskatchewan, Canada
- Military career
- Allegiance: Canada
- Branch: Royal Canadian Navy (Note: Known as Canadian Forces Maritime Command until 2011)
- Service years: 1987–2022
- Rank: Vice-Admiral
- Commands: Royal Canadian Navy; Maritime Forces Atlantic; Canadian Fleet Atlantic; Canadian Forces Base Esquimalt; HMCS Winnipeg
- Awards: Commander of the Order of Military Merit; Meritorious Service Cross; Canadian Forces' Decoration

Vice-Admiral Craig Alan Baines CMM MSC CD is a retired Royal Canadian Navy officer who served as Commander of the Royal Canadian Navy from 2021 to 2022.

== Personal ==
Baines hails from Saskatchewan and before his military career was a national judo medallist and graduate from the University of Manitoba.

== Military career ==
He was appointed Commander Canadian Fleet Atlantic in July 2014 before being promoted to Commander Maritime Forces Atlantic in 2017.

He joined Maritime Command in 1987 and completed the Forces Regular Officer Training Program. He served as navigation officer on a number of ships before completing an operations course. In 2004 he served as executive officer of HMCS Calgary, and in 2007 he was appointed commanding officer of the Halifax-class frigate HMCS Winnipeg.

In 2010 he served as the base commander of Canadian Forces Base Esquimalt. This was followed by a stint as special advisor to the Chief of Defence Staff, after which he became fleet commander of Canadian Fleet Atlantic.

He became Commander of the Royal Canadian Navy on January 12, 2021. He stood down in May 2022 pending retirement, and retired in late 2022.

== Post military career ==
In October 2022, it was announced that Baines had joined Modest Tree as a strategic advisor, for the company’s efforts in the marine, aerospace and defence industries.

== Controversies ==
Baines apologised after it was reported that he had played golf with General Jonathan Vance while the latter was under investigation for alleged abuse towards female military staff.

== Honours and decorations ==
Baines's personal awards and decorations included the following:

| Ribbon | Description | Notes |
| | Order of Military Merit (CMM) | Appointed Commander (CMM) on 21 September 2020 |
| | Meritorious Service Cross (MSC) | Appointed (MSC) on 7 October 2009; Military division; Received the for his leadership of HMCS Winnipeg during counter-piracy operations. |
| | Special Service Medal | with NATO-OTAN Clasp |
| | NATO Medal Non-Article 5 | with Africa clasp |
| | Canadian Forces' Decoration (CD) | with two Clasp for 32 years of services |

Command Commendation

== Notes ==
Military offices
| Preceded by Art McDonald | Commander of the Royal Canadian Navy; 2021–2022 | Succeeded by Angus Topshee |
| Preceded by John Newton | Commander Maritime Forces Atlantic; 2017–2021 | Succeeded by Brian Santarpia |
| Preceded by Scott Bishop | Commander Canadian Fleet Atlantic; 2014–2017 | Succeeded by Craig Skjerpen |
