= Wayne Eyre =

Canadian general officer

General Wayne Eyre CMM MSC CD
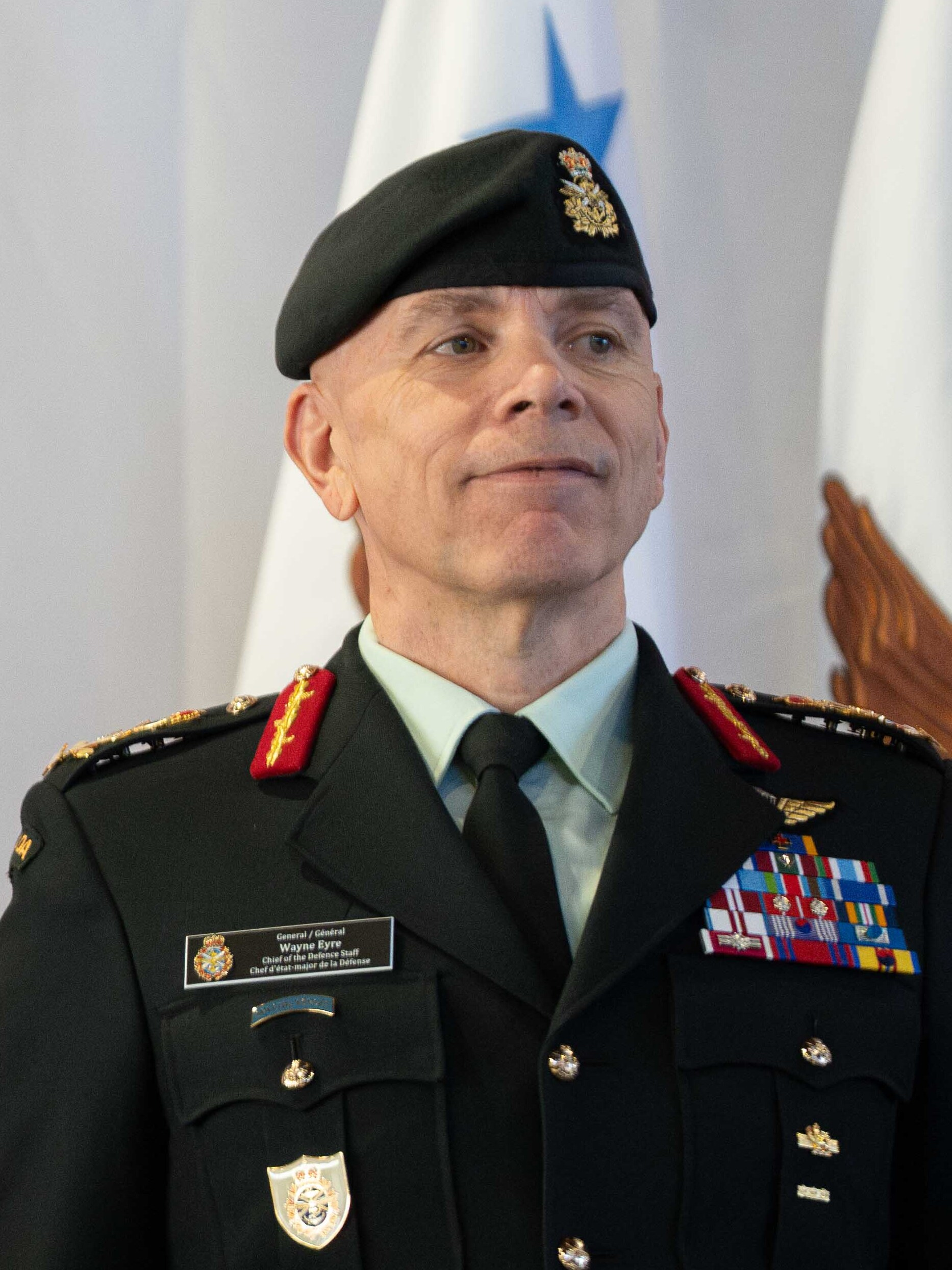
- Eyre in February 2024
- Born: Wayne Donald Eyre; 1966 or 1967 (age 59–60); Wadena, Saskatchewan, Canada
- Military career
- Allegiance: Canada
- Branch: Canadian Army
- Service years: 1988–2024
- Rank: General
- Commands: Chief of the Defence Staff; Commander of the Canadian Army and Chief of the Army Staff; Military Personnel Command; Deputy Commander United Nations Command; 3rd Canadian Division; 2 Canadian Mechanized Brigade Group; 3rd Battalion, Princess Patricia's Canadian Light Infantry
- Conflicts: War in Afghanistan; Croatian War of Independence (Peacekeeping)
- Awards: Commander of the Order of Military Merit; Meritorious Service Cross; Canadian Forces' Decoration; Commander of the Legion of Merit (United States); Commander of the National Order of Merit (France); Order of National Security Merit, Gukseon Medal (South Korea)

General Wayne Donald Eyre (born 1966/1967) is a retired Canadian Forces officer who served as the chief of the Defence Staff (CDS) from 2021 to 2024. Eyre was named acting CDS on February 24, 2021, and appointed to the full position on November 25, 2021. He was also the commander of the Canadian Army and chief of the Army Staff.

== Early life ==
Eyre was born on a farm near Wadena, Saskatchewan, joining the Army Cadets at age 12. He spent his high school years in Medicine Hat, Alberta. Eyre attended Royal Roads Military College and the Royal Military College.

== Military career ==
Eyre was commissioned into the 2nd Battalion, Princess Patricia's Canadian Light Infantry in 1988.

In 1993, Eyre, who was a captain at the time, was deployed to Croatia as part of the United Nations Protection Force. He took part in Operation Medak Pocket in which he commanded a reconnaissance platoon, which witnessed the aftermath of ethnic cleansing in the village of Lički Čitluk.

He became commanding officer of the 3rd Battalion, Princess Patricia's Canadian Light Infantry in 2004. He went on to become commander of 2 Canadian Mechanized Brigade Group in 2009 and, after that, Deputy Commanding General of Operations for the United States Army's XVIII Airborne Corps in 2012, in which role he was deployed to Afghanistan. He was appointed General Officer Commanding 3rd Canadian Division and Joint Task Force West in 2014.

In May 2018, Eyre became the first non-American to serve as deputy commander of the United Nations Command in South Korea. He was succeeded by Vice Admiral Stuart Mayer of the Royal Australian Navy in June 2019, and returned to Canada as Commander Military Personnel Command.

On July 12, 2019, it was announced Eyre would be appointed the Commander of the Canadian Army, effective from August 20.

Eyre was appointed acting Chief of the Defence Staff on February 24, 2021, following the stepping aside of Admiral Art McDonald pending an investigation by the Canadian Forces National Investigation Service. He was promoted to full general on August 13, 2021 and appointed as the official Chief of Defence Staff on November 25, 2021.

Eyre was made a Commander of the United States' Legion of Merit on April 24, 2021. He had previously been appointed as an officer of the American order while a brigadier-general in 2015 and, in 2020, was awarded an Oak Leaf Cluster (second award) to the Legion of Merit.

On March 15, 2022, Eyre, along with 313 other Canadians, was banned from entering Russia, in protest of the Government of Canada's opposition to the Russian invasion of Ukraine.

On January 12, 2024, Eyre announced that he would step down from Chief of the Defence Staff in the summer. The change came into effect on July 18, ending his career in the Canadian Armed Forces.

== Honours and decorations ==
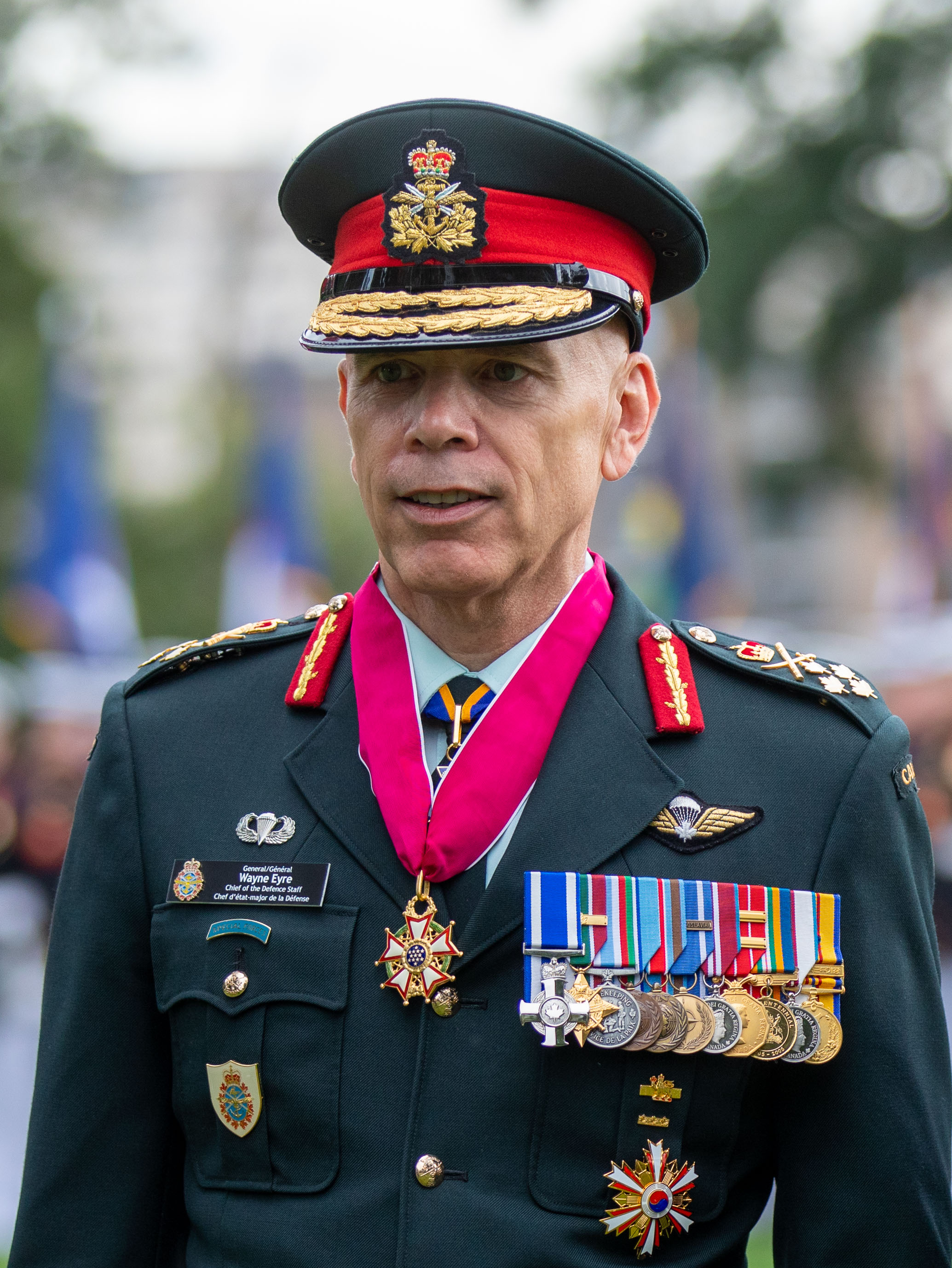
General Wayne Eyre in 2023

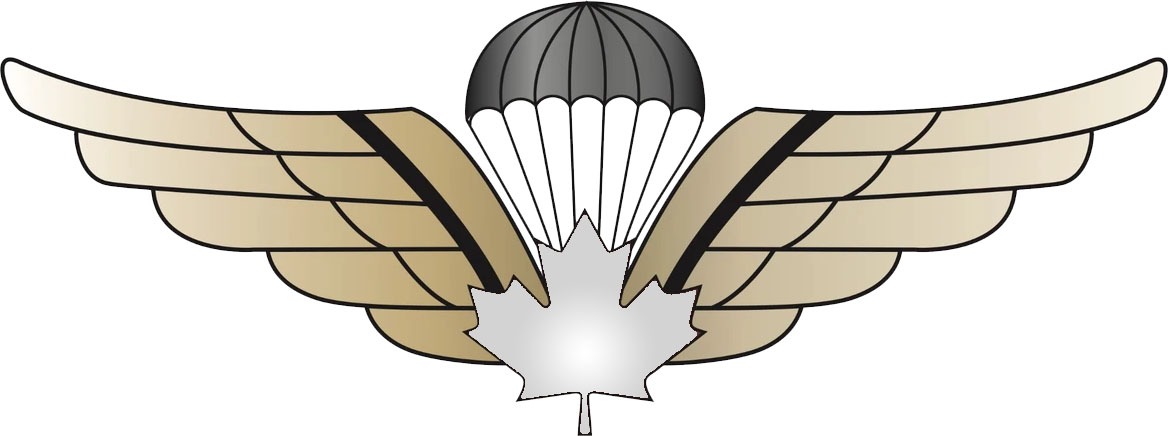

Ribbon	Description	Notes
	Order of Military Merit (CMM)	
	Meritorious Service Cross (MSC)	
	General Campaign Star	With Rotation Bar
	Canadian Peacekeeping Service Medal	
	UN Forces in Cyprus	
	UN Protection Force (Yugoslavia)	
	NATO Medal for Former Yugoslavia	
	Queen Elizabeth II's Diamond Jubilee Medal	
	Canadian Forces' Decoration (CD)	2 Clasps 32 years of service in the Canadian Forces
	Alberta Centennial Medal	
	Queens Elizabeth II's Platinum Jubilee Medal	Provincial
	Badge of Honour of the Bundeswehr	Gold Cross From Germany
	Gugseon Security Medal	From South Korea
	Ordre National du Mérite	Degree of Commander From France
	Legion of Merit	Degree of Commander From United States of America
	40 Years of Yugoslav People's Army Medal	
	Republic of Korea Service Medal	

Military offices
Preceded by Thomas W. Bergeson	Deputy Commander United Nations Command; 2018–2019	Succeeded by Stuart Mayer
Preceded by Jean-Marc Lanthier	Commander of the Canadian Army; 2019–2021	Succeeded by Michel-Henri St-Louis
Preceded by Art McDonald	Chief of the Defence Staff; 2021–2024	Succeeded by Jennie Carignan
