= Brian Santarpia =

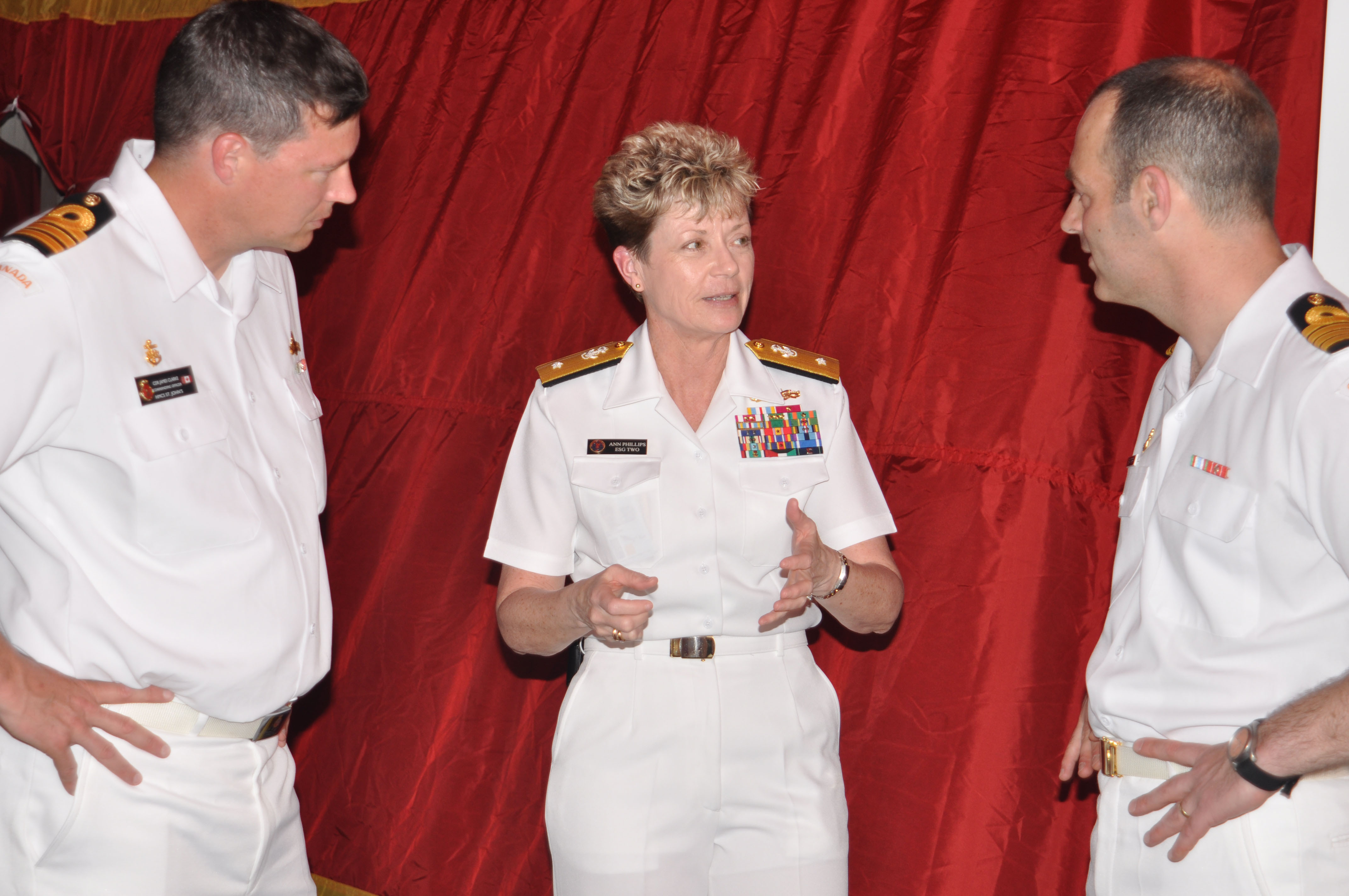
- Santarpia (right)
- Military career
- Allegiance: Canada
- Branch: Royal Canadian Navy
- Rank: Rear Admiral
- Commands: Maritime Forces Atlantic; CFB Halifax; HMCS St. John's

Brian Walter Natale Santarpia is a retired Canadian naval officer and former Commander Maritime Forces Atlantic. He served in the Canadian Forces from 1986 to 2023.

== Career ==
He joined the Canadian Forces as part of Maritime Command as a trainee MARS (Maritime Surface/Sub-surface) officer in 1986 and served in various postings before commanding HMCS St. John's from January 2007 to July 2008.

This was followed by a stint as Commanding Officer of Sea Training Atlantic. In 2009 he was promoted to captain and served as an advisor to the Vice Chief of the Defence Staff before taking command of CFB Halifax.

He was promoted to commodore in July 2013 as Director General Naval Personnel. In December 2014 he commanded Combined Task Force 150. He was appointed Commander Maritime Forces Atlantic in June 2020.

In 2020, as chief of staff of the Canadian Joint Operations Command, Santarpia privately supported using the COVID-19 pandemic as an opportunity to test propaganda techniques on Canadians, saying “This is really a learning opportunity for all of us and a chance to start getting information operations into our (CAF-DND) routine."

In March 2022, Santarpia was accused of failing to provide effective support to a female officer who had complained of sexual harassment. In a written statement to media, he said an administrative investigation he ordered into his male senior officers' actions, and the decisions in which he was involved, "revealed proper procedures were followed, however, the entire chain of command could have provided more effective support to the persons involved."

In June 2023 Santarpia retired from the Canadian Forces.

== Awards ==
Santarpia's personal medals and commendation include the following:

Ribbon	Description	Notes
	Special Service Medal	With "Expedition" Bar
	Canadian Peacekeeping Service Medal	
	Queen Elizabeth Diamond Jubilee Medal	Commemorative medal awarded in 2012; Canadian version
	Canadian Forces' Decoration (CD)	with two Clasp for 32 years of services
	Queen Elizabeth II Platinum Jubilee Medal	Commemorative medal awarded in June 2022; Canadian version - Nova Scotia version

Command Commendation

Military offices
Preceded by Craig Baines	Commander Maritime Forces Atlantic; 2020–2023	Succeeded by Josée Kurtz
