= Lieutenant =

Commissioned officer in many nations' armed forces

A lieutenant (Note: UK: /lɛfˈtɛnənt/ lef-TEN-ənt, US: /luː-/ loo-; see § Pronunciation for more.) (Note: Abbreviated Lt, LT, Lieut, and similar) is a junior commissioned officer rank in the armed forces of many nations, as well as fire services, emergency medical services, security services and police forces.

The rank in armies and air forces is often subdivided into subcategories of seniority. In English-speaking navies, lieutenants are often equivalent to the army rank of captain; in other navies, the lieutenants are usually equal to their army counterparts.

Lieutenant may also appear as part of a title used in various other organisations with a codified command structure. It often designates someone who is "second-in-command", and as such, may precede the name of the rank directly above it. For example, a "lieutenant master" is likely to be second-in-command to the "master" in an organisation using both ranks.

Political uses include lieutenant governor in various governments, such as the viceregal representatives of the Crown in Canadian provinces. In the United Kingdom, a lord lieutenant is the sovereign's representative in a county or lieutenancy area, while a deputy lieutenant is one of the lord lieutenant's deputies.

== Etymology ==
The word lieutenant derives from French; the lieu meaning "place" as in a position (cf. in lieu of); and tenant meaning "holding" as in "holding a position"; thus a "lieutenant" is a placeholder for a superior, during their absence (compare the Latin locum tenens).

In the 19th century, British writers who considered this word either an imposition on the English language, or difficult for common soldiers and sailors, argued for it to be replaced by the calque "steadholder". However, their efforts failed, and the French word is still used, along with its many variations (e.g. lieutenant colonel, lieutenant general, lieutenant commander, flight lieutenant, second lieutenant and many non-English language examples), in both the Old and the New World.

=== Pronunciation ===
Pronunciation of lieutenant as /lɛfˈtɛnənt/ lef-TEN-ənt is generally associated with the armies of British Commonwealth countries, while /luːˈtɛnənt/ loo-TEN-ənt is generally associated with the United States military. The early history of the pronunciation is unclear; Middle English spellings suggest that both pronunciations may have existed even then. The majority of sixteenth- and seventeenth-century sources show pronunciations with /v/ or /f/, but Bullokar has /liu/.

The rare Old French variant spelling leuf for Modern French lieu ('place') supports the suggestion that a final /u/ of the Old French word was in certain environments perceived as an [f]. Furthermore, in Latin the letter ⟨v⟩ is used for both /u/ and /v/. In Royal Naval (RN) tradition—and other English-speaking navies outside the United States—a reduced pronunciation /ləˈtɛnənt/ lə-TEN-ənt is used. This is not recognised as current by recent editions of the OED (although the RN pronunciation was included in editions of the OED up until the 1970s).

== Military rank ==
=== Lieutenant ===
The senior grade of lieutenant is known as first lieutenant in the United States, and as lieutenant in the United Kingdom and the rest of the English-speaking world. In countries that do not speak English, the rank title usually translates as "lieutenant", but may also translate as "first lieutenant" or "senior lieutenant". In the Finnish military there is a senior lieutenant grade that ranks above lieutenant and second lieutenant but below captain; it does not have an English equivalent. In Germany it is called Oberleutnant (senior lieutenant).

==== Army rank ====
Conventionally, armies and other services or branches that use army-style rank titles have two grades of lieutenant, but a few also use a third, more junior, rank. Historically, the "lieutenant" was the deputy to a "captain", and as the rank structure of armies began to formalise, this came to mean that a captain commanded a company and had several lieutenants, each commanding a platoon. Where more junior officers were employed as deputies to the lieutenant, they went by many names, including second lieutenant, sub-lieutenant, ensign and cornet. Some parts of the British Army, including the Royal Artillery, Royal Engineers and fusilier regiments, used first lieutenant as well as second lieutenant until the end of the 19th century, and some British Army regiments still preserve cornet as an official alternative to second lieutenant.

There is great variation in the insignia used worldwide. In most English-speaking and Arabic-speaking countries, as well as a number of European and South American nations, full lieutenants (and equivalents) usually wear two stars (pips) and second lieutenants (and equivalents) one. An example of an exception is the United States, whose armed forces distinguish their lieutenant ranks with a silver bar for first lieutenant and a gold bar for second lieutenant.

Lieutenant
Arabic: ملازم أول, romanized: Mulazim awwal
(Algerian Land Forces)

Tenente
(Angolan Army)

Teniente
(Argentine Army)

լեյտենանտ
Leytenant
(Armenian Ground Forces)

Lieutenant
(Australian Army)

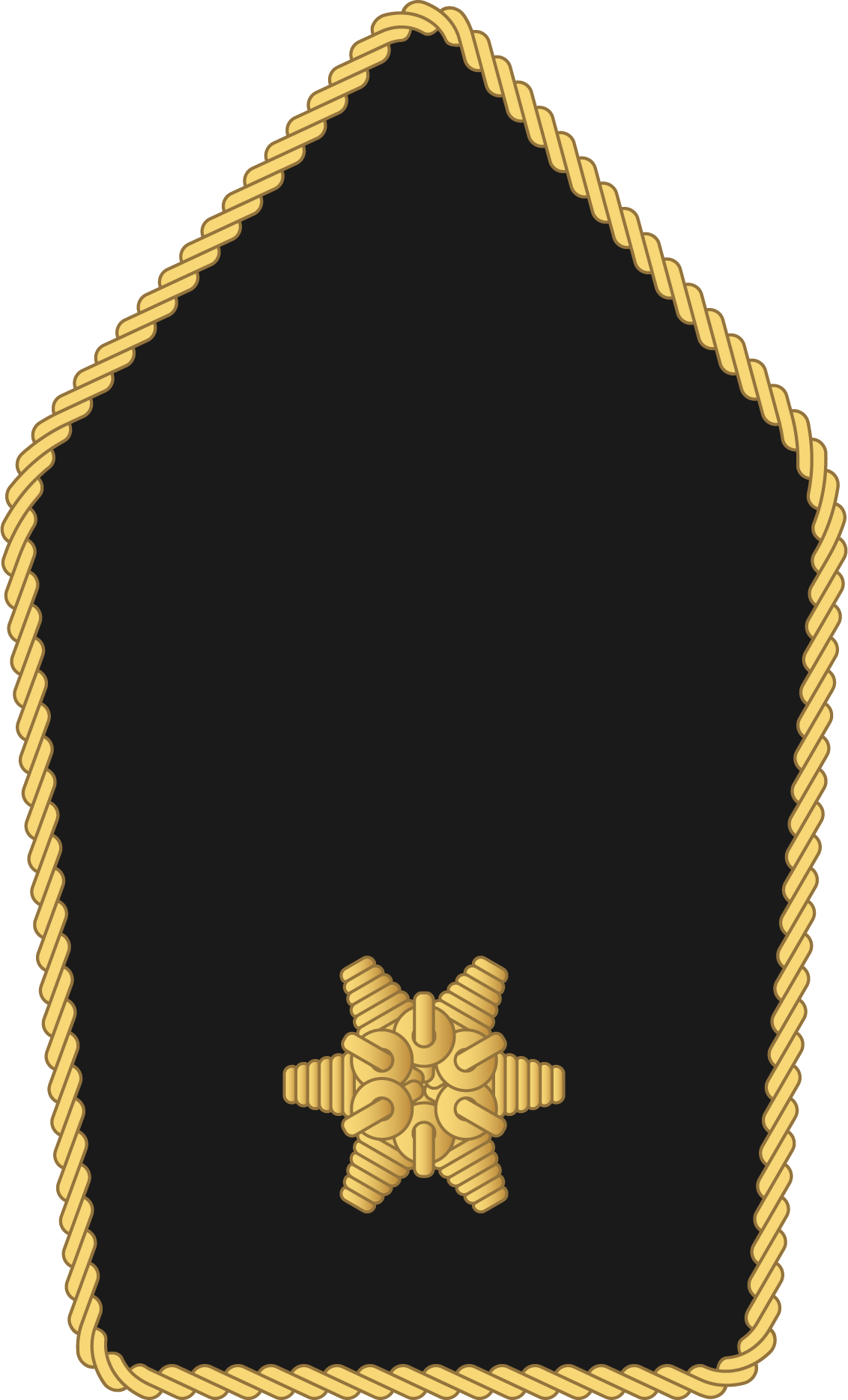
Leutnant
(Austrian Army)

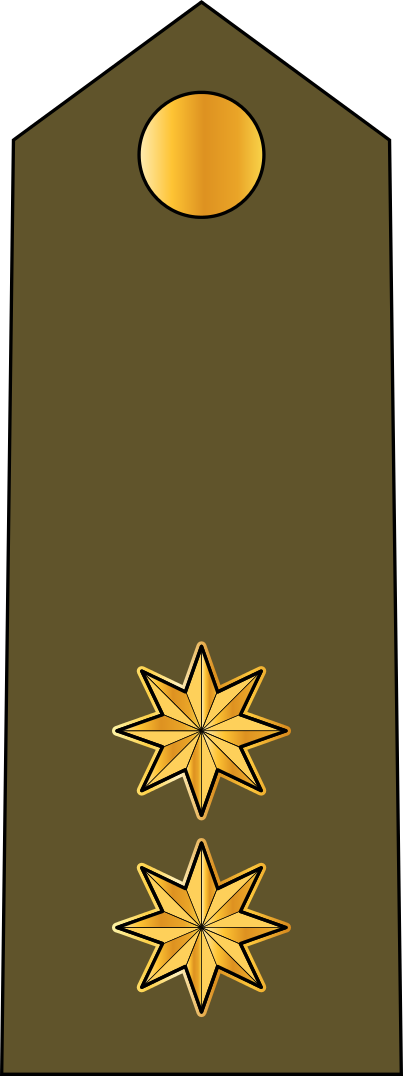
Leytenant
(Azerbaijani Land Forces)

Lieutenant
Bengali: লেফটেন্যান্ট
(Bangladesh Army)

Лейтэнант
Liejtenant
(Belarusian Ground Forces)

Lieutenant
(Belgian Land Component)

Lieutenant
(Belize Ground Forces)

Lieutenant
(Benin Army)

Teniente
(Bolivian Army)

Lieutenant
(Royal Bhutan Army)

Leftenan
(Royal Brunei Land Force)

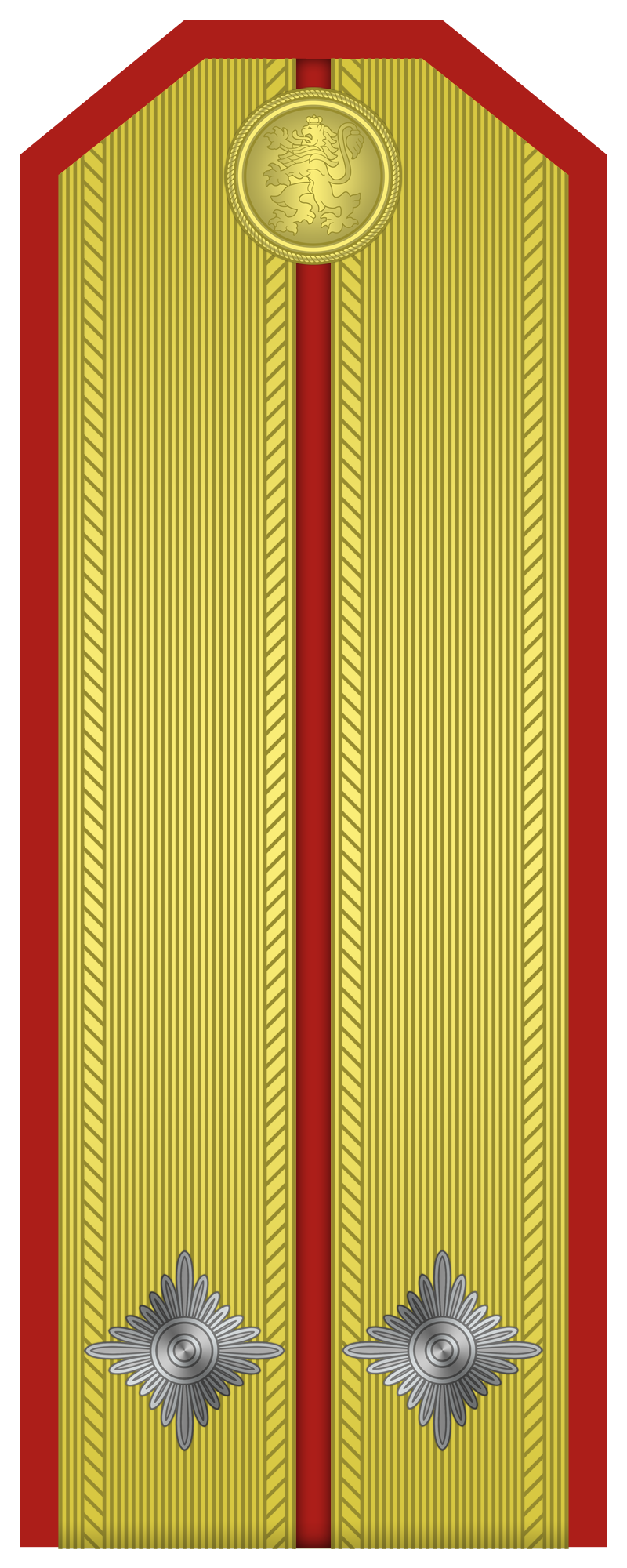
Лейтенант
Leytenant
(Bulgarian Land Forces)

Lieutenant
(Burkina Faso Ground Forces)

Lieutenant
Kirundi: Riyetena
(Burundi Ground Forces)

Lieutenant
(Cameroon Ground Forces)

Lieutenant
French: Lieutenant
(Canadian Army)

Tenente
(Cape Verdean National Guard)

Lieutenant
(Central African Ground Forces)

Lieutenant
(Chadian Ground Forces)

Teniente
(Chilean Army)

Teniente
(Colombian Army)

Lieutenant
(Comorian Army)

Lieutenant
(Land Forces of the DR Congo)

Lieutenant
(Congolese Ground Forces)

Teniente
(Cuban Revolutionary Army)

Løjtnant
(Royal Danish Army)

Lieutenant
(Djiboutian Army)

Teniente
(Ecuadorian Army)

Teniente
(Salvadoran Army)

Teniente
(Army of Equatorial Guinea)

Leitnant
(Estonian Land Forces)

Lieutenant
(Fiji Infantry Regiment)

Luutnantti
Löjtnant
(Finnish Army)

Lieutenant
(French Army)

Lieutenant
(Gabonese Army)

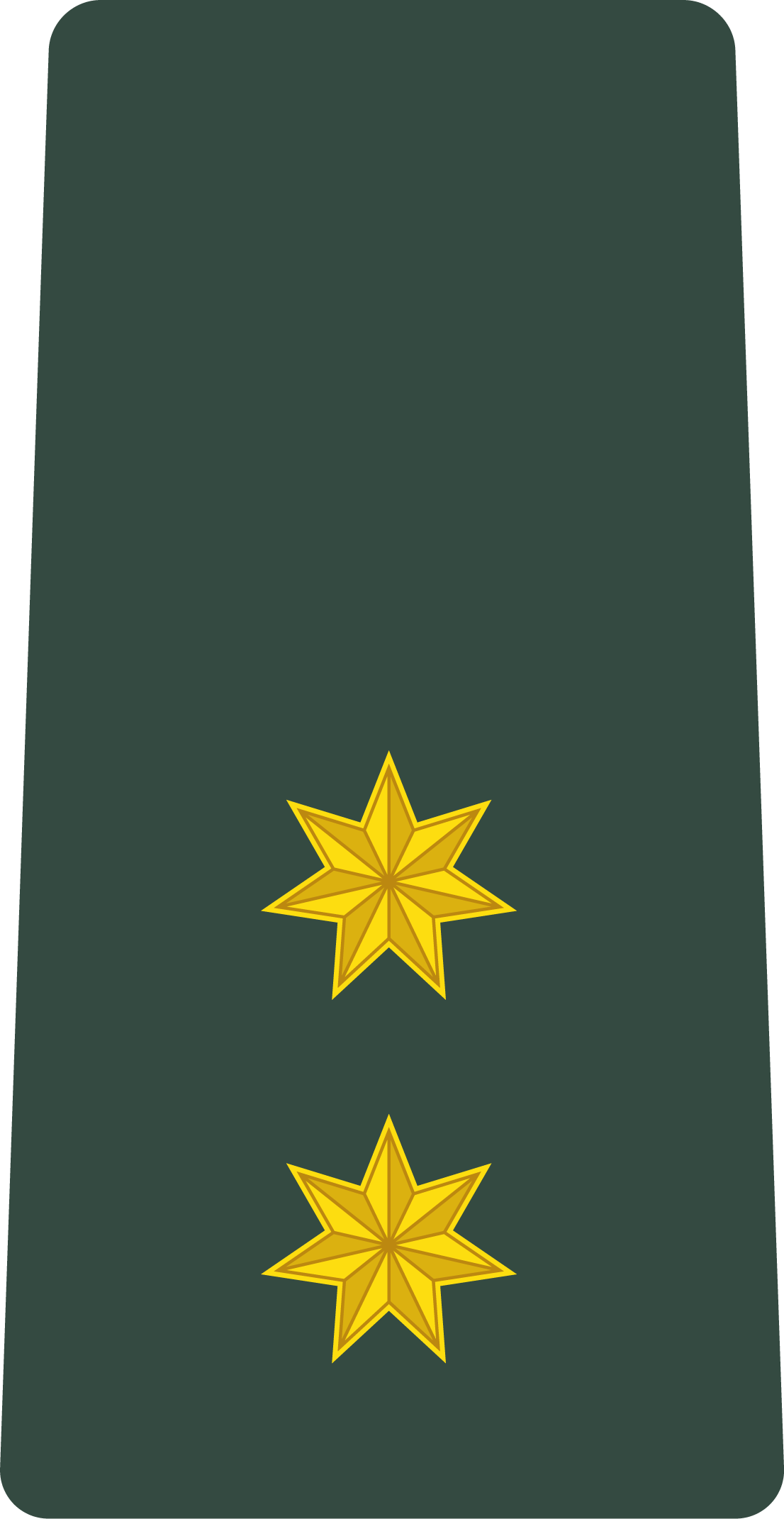
ლეიტენანტი
Leit’enant’i
(Georgian Land Forces)

Leutnant
(German Army)

Lieutenant
(Ghana Army)

Teniente
(Guatemalan Army)

Lieutenant
(Guinea Ground Forces)

Lieutenant
(Guyana Army)

Lieutenant
(Haitian Army)

Teniente
(Honduran Army)

Lieutenant
Hindi: लेफ्टिनेंट
(Indian Army)

Lieutenant
Irish: Leifteanant
(Irish Army)

Tenente
(Italian Army)

Lieutenant
(Ivory Coast Ground Forces)

Lieutenant
(Jamaican Army)

Лейтенант
Leytenant
(Kazakh Ground Forces)

Lieutenant
(Kenya Army)

Лейтенант
Leytenant
(Kyrgyz Army)

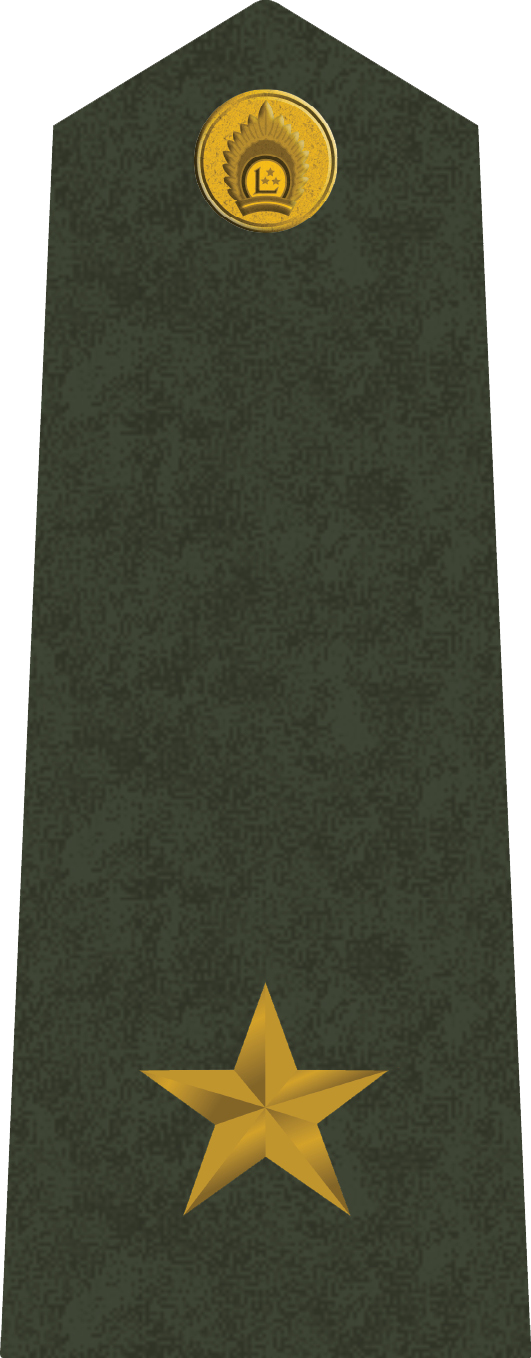
Leitnants
(Latvian Land Forces)

Lieutenant
(Lesotho Army)

Leitenantas
(Lithuanian Land Forces)

Lieutenant
(Luxembourg Army)

Lieutenant
(Madagascar Ground Forces)

Lieutenant
(Malawian Army)

Logutenent
(Army of Malta)

Leftenan
(Malaysian Army)

Lieutenant
(Malian Army)

Teniente
(Mexican Army)

Locotenent
(Moldovan Ground Forces)

Lieutenant
(Army of Monaco)

Lieutenant
(Royal Moroccan Army)

Tenente
(Mozambican Army)

Lieutenant
(Namibian Army)

Lieutenant
Nepali: उपसेनानी, romanized: Upasēnānī
(Nepali Army)

Lieutenant
(New Zealand Army)

Teniente
(Nicaraguan Army)

Lieutenant
(Niger Ground Forces)

Lieutenant
(Nigerian Army)

Lieutenant
لیفٹنینٹ
(Pakistani Army)

Teniente
(Paraguayan Army)

Teniente
(Peruvian Army)

Tenente
(Portuguese Army)

Locotenent
(Romanian Land Forces)

Лейтенант
Leytenant
(Russian Ground Forces)

Lieutenant
(Rwandan Land Forces)

Lieutenant
(SKN Regiment)

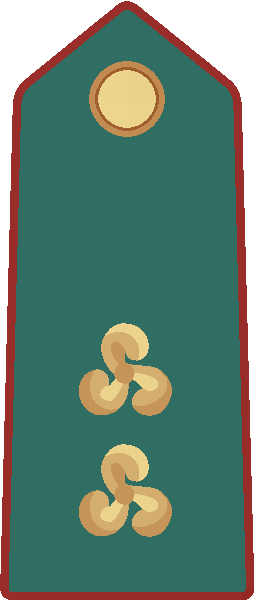
Tenente
(Sammarinese Guard of the Rock)

Tenente
(Army of São Tomé and Príncipe)

Lieutenant
(Senegalese Army)

Lieutenant
(Seychelles Infantry Unit)

Lieutenant
(Singapore Army)

Lieutenant
(South African Army)

Teniente
(Spanish Army)

Lieutenant
(Sri Lanka Army)

Löjtnant
(Swedish Army)

Leutnant
(Swiss Army)

Лейтенант
Lejtenant
(Tajik Ground Forces)

Lieutenant
Luteni
(Tanzanian Army)

Tenente
(Timor-Leste Army)

Lieutenant
(Togolese Army)

Lieutenant
(Tongan Land Component)

Lieutenant
(Trinidad and Tobago Regiment)

Leýtenant
(Turkmen Ground Forces)

Lieutenant
(Ugandan Land Forces)

Лейтенант
Leitenant
(Ukrainian Ground Forces)

Lieutenant
(British Army)

Leutnant
(Swiss Guard)

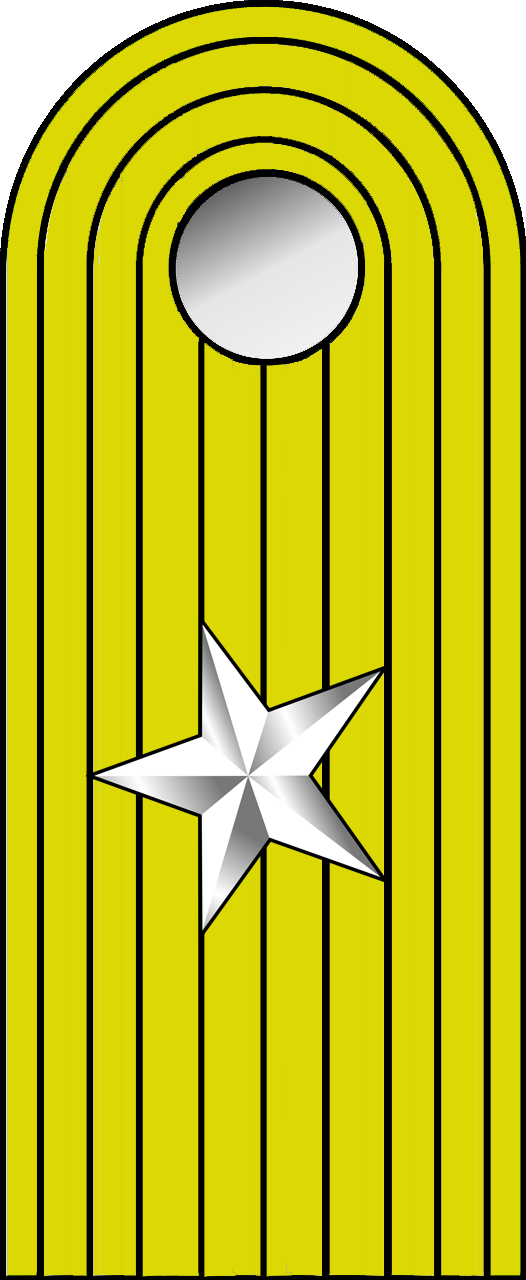
Teniente
(Venezuelan Army)

Leytenant
(Uzbek Ground Forces)

Lieutenant
(Zambian Army)

Lieutenant
(Zimbabwe National Army)

==== Marine rank ====
The United States Marine Corps and British Royal Marines both use army ranks, while many former Eastern-Bloc marine forces retain the naval rank structure. Before 1999 the Royal Marines enjoyed the same rank structure as the army, but at a grade higher; thus a Royal Marine captain ranked with and was paid the same as a British Army major. This historical remnant caused increasing confusion in multi-national operations and was abolished.

Teniente
(Colombian Naval Infantry)

ލެފްޓިނަންޓް
Leftinant
(Maldivian Marine Corps)

Teniente
(Spanish Marine Infantry)

Löjtnant
(Swedish Amphibious Corps)

Lieutenant
(Royal Marines)

==== Air force rank ====
While some air forces use the army rank system, the British Royal Air Force and many other Commonwealth air forces use another rank system in which flight lieutenant ranks with an army captain and naval lieutenant, a flying officer ranks with an army lieutenant and a pilot officer with an army second lieutenant.

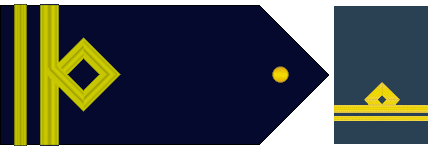
Lieutenant
(Argentine Air Force)

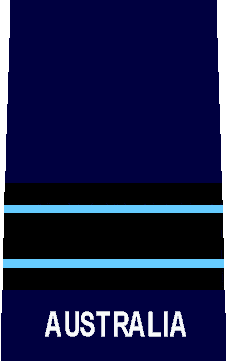
Flight lieutenant
(Royal Australian Air Force)

Lieutenant
(Royal Canadian Air Force)

Flight lieutenant
(Indian Air Force)

Teniente
(Mexican Air Force)

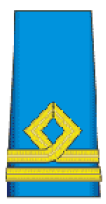
Locotenent
(Romanian Air Force)

Lieutenant
(South African Air Force)

Teniente
(Spanish Air Force)

Löjtnant
(Swedish Air Force)

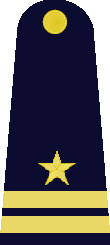
Flight lieutenant
(Royal Thai Air Force)

Flight lieutenant
(Royal Air Force)

In the US Air Force, the Third Lieutenant Program refers specifically to a training program at active duty air force bases for cadets of the Air Force Academy and Air Force ROTC the summer before their fourth and final year before graduation and commissioning. A single silver or subdued pip is used to designate this rank.

The Royal Air Force also has an acting pilot officer designation, the most junior commissioned rank in the British armed forces. It is functionally equivalent to third lieutenant.

==== Naval rank ====
During the early days of the naval rank, a lieutenant might be very junior indeed, or might be on the cusp of promotion to captain; by modern standards, he might rank with any army rank between second lieutenant and lieutenant colonel. As the rank structure of navies stabilized, and the ranks of commander, lieutenant commander and sub-lieutenant were introduced, the naval lieutenant came to rank with an army captain (NATO OF-2 or US O-3).

The insignia of a lieutenant in many navies, including the Royal Navy, consists of two medium gold braid stripes (top stripe with loop) on a navy blue or black background. Where in Myanmar Navy, they're Sub Lieutenant with the insignia of 2 gold stars. This pattern was copied by the United States Navy and various Air Forces for their equivalent ranks grades, except that the loop is removed (see flight lieutenant).

France

Greece

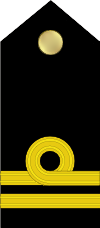
India

Philippines (Lieutenant Senior Grade)

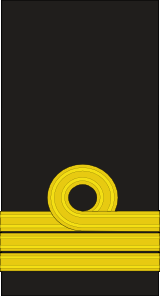
Portugal

Russia

United States

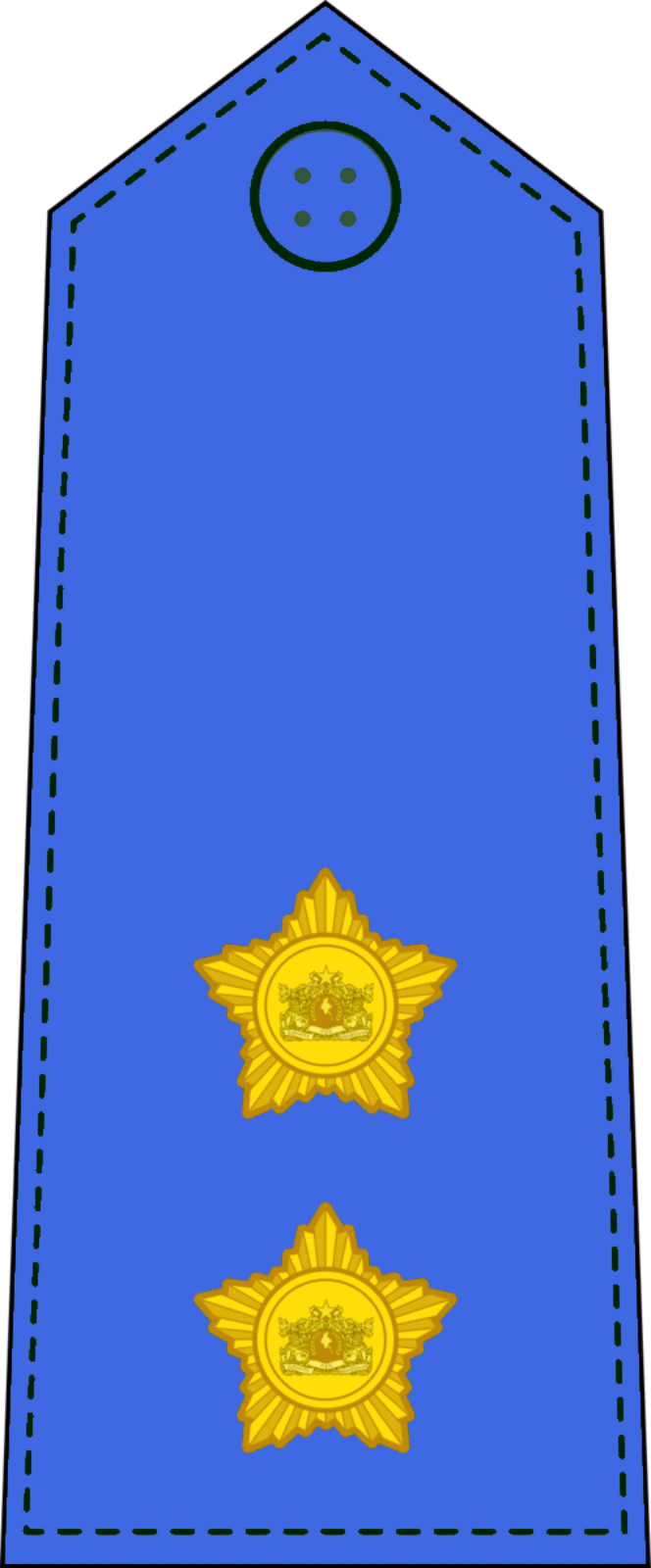
Myanmar

=== Lieutenant commander ===
Lieutenants were commonly put in command of smaller vessels not warranting a commander or captain: such a lieutenant was called a "lieutenant commanding" or "lieutenant commandant" in the United States Navy, and a "lieutenant in command" or "lieutenant and commander" in the Royal Navy. The USN settled on "lieutenant commander" in 1862, and made it a distinct rank; the Royal Navy followed suit in March 1914. The insignia of an additional half-thickness stripe between the two full stripes of a lieutenant was introduced in 1877 for a Royal Navy lieutenant of 8 years seniority, and used for lieutenant commanders upon introduction of their rank.

=== First lieutenant ===
==== "First lieutenant" in naval use ====
The first lieutenant in the Royal Navy and other Commonwealth navies, is a post or appointment, rather than a rank. Historically the lieutenants in a ship were ranked in accordance with seniority, with the most senior being termed the "first lieutenant" and acting as the second-in-command. Although lieutenants are no longer numbered by seniority, the post of "first lieutenant" remains. In minor war vessels, destroyers and frigates the first lieutenant (either a lieutenant or lieutenant-commander) is second in command, executive officer (XO) and head of the executive branch; in larger ships where a commander of the warfare specialization is appointed as the executive officer, a first lieutenant (normally a lieutenant-commander) is appointed as his deputy. The post of first lieutenant in a shore establishment carries a similar responsibility to the first lieutenant of a capital ship.

In the U.S. Navy or U.S. Coast Guard the billet of first lieutenant describes the officer in charge of the deck department or division, depending upon the size of the ship. In smaller ships with only a single deck division, the billet is typically filled by an ensign while in larger ships with a deck department, consisting of multiple subordinate divisions, the billet may be filled by a lieutenant commander. On submarines and smaller Coast Guard cutters the billet of first lieutenant may be filled by a petty officer.

=== Second lieutenant ===
Second lieutenant is usually the most junior grade of commissioned officer. In most cases, newly commissioned officers do not remain at the rank for long before being promoted, and both university graduates and officers commissioned from the ranks may skip the rank altogether.

=== Third lieutenant ===
==== Philippines ====
The following military and paramilitary services had the grade of third lieutenant: In the American Period, the Philippine Constabulary (PC) and the Philippine Army (PA), for which there was no insignia; During the Japanese period, the Bureau of Constabulary (BOC), whose insignia was a white-metal half-diamond which resembled a "V"; and in the forties, by the Philippine Army and the Philippine Air Force (PAF), during the postcolonial republic

==== United States rank ====
In March 1813, the US Army created the rank of third lieutenant. The rank was used as the entry level officer rank for the Ordnance Department and the Corps of Artillery until March 1821. Throughout the 19th century and until as late as World War II the United States Army sometimes referred to brevet second lieutenants as "third lieutenants". These were typically newly commissioned officers for which no authorized second lieutenant position existed. Additionally, the Confederate States Army also used "third lieutenant", typically as the lowest ranking commissioned officer in an infantry company.

Notably, the United States Revenue Cutter Service used a simple officer rank structure with Captain, First, Second and Third Lieutenants, each of whom had distinct insignia. The title of Third Lieutenant, essentially equal to the rank of ensign, existed until 1915 when the Service became the nucleus of the new United States Coast Guard. Because of the time required to fully establish this organization the rank continued for some time afterwards; the first Coast Guard aviator, Elmer Fowler Stone, was a third lieutenant until 1918.

=== Sub-lieutenant ===
In the Royal Navy, the commissioned rank of mate was created in 1840, and was renamed sub-lieutenant in 1860. In the US Navy, the rank was called master until 1883, when it was renamed lieutenant, junior grade. In many navies, a sub-lieutenant is a naval commissioned or subordinate officer, ranking below a lieutenant, but in Brazil it is the highest non-commissioned rank, and in Spain it is the second highest non-commissioned rank. In Portugal, sub-lieutenant is the rank of a junior naval officer graduated from a civil university or promoted from a NCO rank, while the equivalent rank of an officer graduated in the naval academy is designated midshipman.

== Other uses ==
=== Police rank ===
==== France and the French Union ====
The first French Lieutenant of Police, Gabriel Nicolas de la Reynie, was appointed in Paris by Louis XIV on 15 March 1667 to command a reformed police force. He was later elevated to Lieutenant-General of Police. In the 17th century, the term "lieutenant" corresponded to "deputy" (i.e. a person appointed to carry out a task). La Reynie was the deputy for policing duties of the Provost of Paris, the ceremonial representative of the King in Paris. In 1995, the rank of lieutenant was introduced in the National Police as the first rank of the police officers scale.

==== United Kingdom and Commonwealth police forces ====
The rank of Lieutenant was formerly used in areas outside of the Metropolitan Police. The adoption of standardized ranks across the United Kingdom has eliminated its use. A number of city and burgh police forces in Scotland used the rank of lieutenant (and detective lieutenant) between inspector and superintendent from 1812 to 1948. It was replaced by the rank of chief inspector. The Royal Newfoundland Constabulary (founded 1871) had the rank of lieutenant between staff sergeant and inspector until 1997. In Australia, Queensland's first police force (founded 1864) had second lieutenants and lieutenants between the ranks of sergeant and inspector-general.

==== United States police forces ====
The rank of police lieutenant is used in most medium or large police departments in the United States, where it is one rank above sergeant and two ranks above a regular police officer (three in departments with a corporal rank). It is roughly equivalent to an inspector in the British and Canadian police forces. The usual role of a lieutenant is to carry out administrative duties and assist precinct commanders (normally a captain, or sometimes the local police chiefs). In smaller police departments, they may command a precinct itself. Lieutenants either command a watch (8-hour "shift") of regular officers or a special unit for operations or investigations (like a Robbery-Homicide squad). The typical rank insignia for a lieutenant is a single silver bar (like that of an Army or Marine Corps First Lieutenant) or a single gold bar (like that of an Army or Marine Corps Second Lieutenant). Some police departments split the rank of lieutenant into two separate grades.

==== Other nations ====
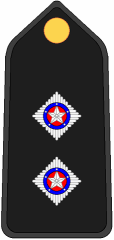
1st Lieutenant
(Military Police (Brazil))

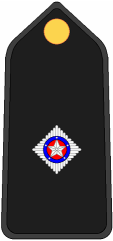
2nd Lieutenant
(Military Police (Brazil))

Police Lieutenant
(Philippine National Police)

Tenente
(Portuguese National Republican Guard)

Teniente
(Spanish Civil Guard)

Police Lieutenant
(National Police of Ukraine)

US Police 1st Lieutenant
(Police ranks of the United States)

US Police 2nd Lieutenant
(Police ranks of the United States)

Лейтенант полиции (Leytenant politsii)
(Police of Russia)

=== Fire services rank ===
==== Singapore ====
In the Singapore Civil Defence Force, the rank of lieutenant (LTA) is the second-lowest commissioned rank. The rank insignia of LTA is two pips.

=== Political titles ===
==== Canada ====
In Canada, the representative of the Canadian monarch in each province is called the Lieutenant Governor. The Lieutenant Governor exercises all the royal prerogative powers that the monarch holds.

==== France ====
In French history, "lieutenant du roi" was a title borne by the officer sent with military powers to represent the king in certain provinces. It is in the sense of a deputy that it has entered into the titles of more senior officers, lieutenant general and lieutenant colonel.

==== Spain ====
Similar to other monarchies, in Spain existed the office of "lugarteniente" (Luogotenente), a King's representative with some royal powers such us government and justice. The last person to hold the office was Cardinal Luis Manuel Fernández de Portocarrero, who served as Lieutenant General of the Realm (regent) from 1 November 1700 to 18 February 1701.

In more recent times, the title of lieutenant has been used to refer to the second-in-command of an institution. For example, in the Spanish Public Prosecutor's Office, the second to the Attorney General is the Lieutenant Attorney of the Supreme Court. Likewise, in many Spanish municipalities, there is the position of the Lieutenant Mayor (teniente de alcalde, commonly translated as deputy mayor).

==== United Kingdom ====
The British monarch's representatives in the counties of the United Kingdom are called Lords Lieutenant. The Lord Lieutenant of Ireland performed the function of viceroy in Ireland.

==== United States ====
The Lieutenant Governor is an official in state governments of 45 out of 50 United States. In most cases, the lieutenant governor is the highest officer of state after the governor, standing in for the governor when they are absent from the state or temporarily incapacitated. In the event a governor dies, resigns, or is removed from office, the lieutenant governor typically becomes governor.

In the United States, a governor serves as the chief executive officer and commander-in-chief in each of the fifty states and in the five permanently inhabited territories, functioning as both head of state and head of government therein.

=== Other organisations ===
==== The Boys' Brigade ====
Leaders, or officers of the Boys' Brigade, particularly in the United Kingdom, are ranked as lieutenants after having completed their formal training, before which they are ranked as warrant officers. Officers serving in staff or command posts are awarded the "brevet" rank of captain, these officers then revert to their lieutenancy after having completed their tour of duty.

==== National Civil Defence Cadet Corps ====
The rank of cadet lieutenant (CLT) is given to officer cadet trainees who have passed their officer's course. The rank insignia of CLT is a pip and a bar below it. CLTs may be promoted to the rank of senior cadet lieutenant (S/CLT), which has a rank insignia of a pip and two bars below it.

==== The Salvation Army ====
The Salvation Army also uses lieutenant to denote first time officers, or clergymen/women.

== See also ==
- Captain lieutenant
- Military rank
- Comparative military ranks
- Tenentism
