= Art McDonald (admiral) =

Royal Canadian Navy admiral

Admiral Art McDonald CMM MSM CD
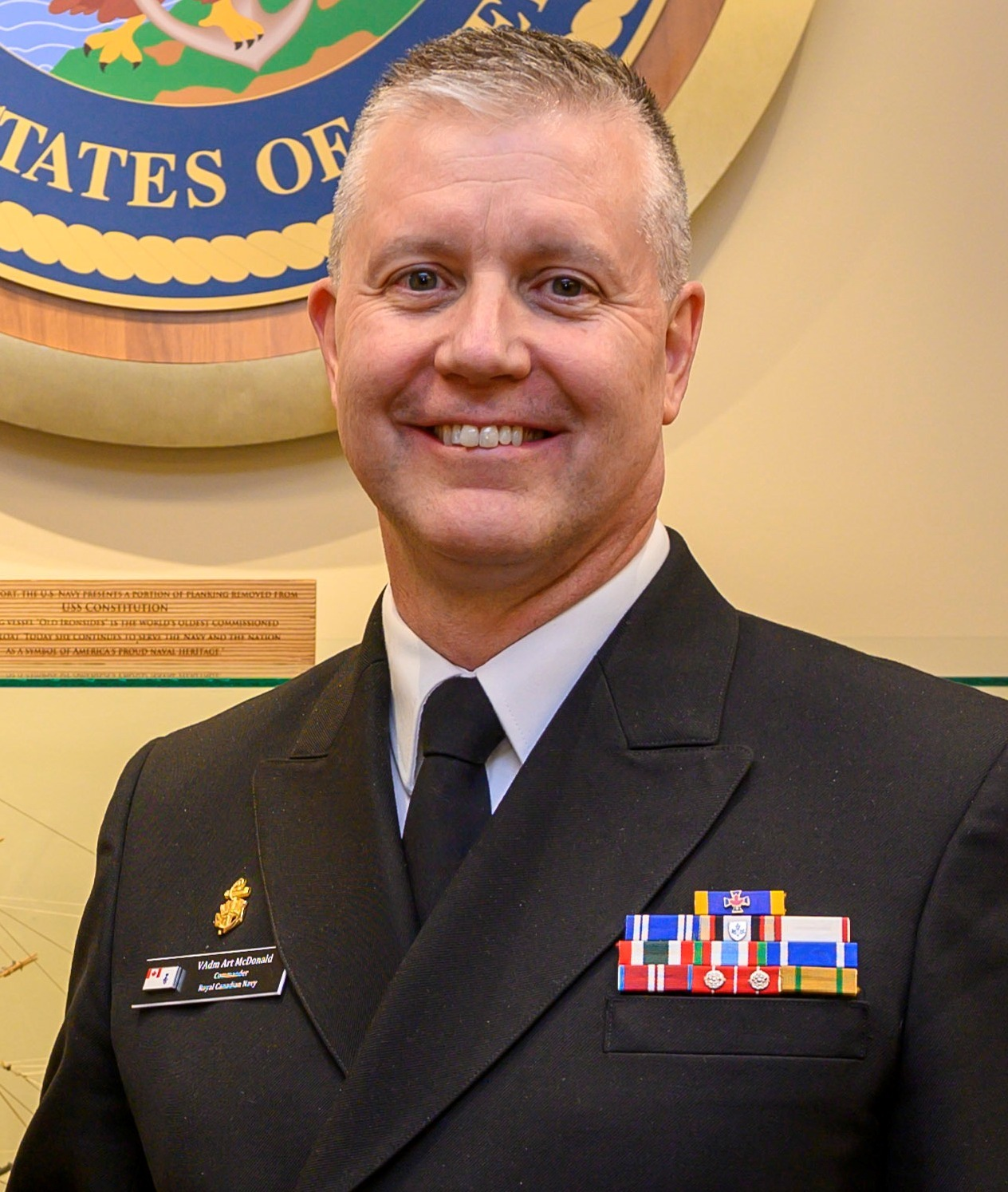
- McDonald in February 2020
- Born: Arthur Gerard McDonald; 1967 (age 58–59); New Waterford, Nova Scotia, Canada
- Education: Royal Military College of Canada (BSc, MDS)
- Military career
- Allegiance: Canada
- Branch: Royal Canadian Navy (Note: Known as Canadian Forces Maritime Command until 2011)
- Service years: 1990-2021
- Rank: Admiral
- Commands: Chief of the Defence Staff; Chief of the Naval Staff; Maritime Forces Pacific; HMCS Halifax
- Conflicts: War in Afghanistan
- Awards: Commander of the Order of Military Merit; Meritorious Service Medal; Canadian Forces' Decoration

Admiral Arthur Gerard McDonald (born 1967) is a retired Royal Canadian Navy admiral who served as Chief of the Defence Staff of the Canadian Armed Forces from January 14, 2021, until February 24, 2021, when he voluntarily stepped aside due to an investigation by the Canadian Forces National Investigation Service. On November 25, 2021, McDonald was formally relieved of his command and replaced permanently by General Wayne Eyre, who had held the post during the interim.

McDonald previously served as Commander of the Royal Canadian Navy and Chief of the Naval Staff. He is Canada's first full admiral since Admiral John Anderson held the rank in 1993.

== Education ==
McDonald graduated from the Royal Military College of Canada (RMC) in 1990 with a bachelor’s degree in military and strategic studies. He also holds a master's of defence studies degree from the same institution. McDonald is also a graduate of the 2003 Canadian Forces College (CFC) Command and Staff Course, the 2012 CFC National Security Studies Programme, and the 2014 U.S. General and Flag Officer Capstone Program at National Defense University in Washington D.C. A 2016 alumnus of the Asia-Pacific Centre for Security Studies, he is also a graduate of the Senior Executives in National and International Security program at Harvard University (2017).

== Career ==
In 2010, McDonald served as the Maritime Component Commander of Canadian Joint Task Force Haiti. He received a Meritorious Service Medal in recognition of his coordination of the disaster relief activities of HMCS Halifax and HMCS Athabaskan. He served as commanding officer of HMCS Halifax from 2007 to 2009 before taking command of Fifth Maritime Operations Group in December 2009.

McDonald was appointed Director General of Maritime Forces Development in February 2014, Commander of Maritime Forces Pacific in January 2016 and Commander of the Royal Canadian Navy in June 2019.

On December 23, 2020, Prime Minister Justin Trudeau announced that McDonald would succeed General Jonathan Vance as Chief of the Defence Staff, with the change of command taking place on January 14, 2021.

He received the Meritorious Service Medal on June 30, 2010, was awarded the Queen Elizabeth Diamond Jubilee Medal in 2012 and was appointed a Commander of the Order of Military Merit (CMM) on October 4, 2018.

=== Misconduct allegations ===
On February 24, 2021, then-Defence Minister Harjit Sajjan announced McDonald had temporarily and voluntarily stepped aside as Chief of the Defence Staff amid investigations on allegations of misconduct. Pending the results of the investigation, General Wayne Eyre served as Acting Chief of Defence Staff. A complainant alleged that McDonald shoved the face of the ship captain into her breasts during a party where alcohol was served.

On August 6, 2021, the Canadian Forces National Investigation Service stated that “the investigation did not reveal evidence to support the laying of charges under either the Code of Service Discipline or the Criminal Code of Canada”. The Privy Council Office said that it would review the situation with next steps to be announced in due course. However on August 11, McDonald announced through his lawyers that he would return as Chief of Defence Staff, which was interpreted "as open defiance to civilian authority" since the Chief of Defence Staff is a governor-in-council appointment that serves at the pleasure of the government. The Privy Council Office responded that McDonald would remain on leave until the matter was reviewed, and a few days later Eyre was promoted to full general.

On October 15, 2021, McDonald sent a letter to generals and flag officers of the Canadian Armed Forces. In that letter he argued why he should be reappointed as the Chief of the Defence Staff, saying that he had been exonerated and the results of the investigation should be accepted, and that the government’s management of the situation had harmed the Canadian Forces. This letter was described as "shocking" by General Eyre who rebutted that the civilian government had the final say on the Chief of the Defence Staff. Prime Minister Justin Trudeau also criticized the timing and contents of the letter, and stated that victims of sexual misconduct must receive as much help as possible. The Canadian Forces National Investigation Service also disagreed with McDonald's claim of exoneration in a statement saying that while “no charges [were] laid based on insufficient evidence...This does not mean that the allegation was unfounded.” Naval Lieutenant Heather Macdonald, the supposed victim in the misconduct allegations, described Admiral McDonald's letter as a "public attack on her integrity and said witnesses corroborated her statement to military police".

On November 25, 2021, McDonald was formally relieved of his command as Chief of Defence Staff, with Eyre being permanently appointed to the position. The Privy Council Office justified McDonald's termination due to his public-relations campaign to regain his old position.

== Awards and decorations ==
McDonald's personal awards and decorations included the following:

Ribbon	Description	Notes
	Order of Military Merit (CMM)	Appointed Commander (CMM), 4 October 2018
	Meritorious Service Medal (MSM)	Awarded 30 June 2010, military division
	South-West Asia Service Medal	AFGHANISTAN clasp
	Operational Service Medal	Humanitarian missions ribbon
	Special Service Medal	NATO-OTAN clasp
	Canadian Peacekeeping Service Medal	
	NATO Medal for the former Yugoslavia	FORMER YUGOSLAVIA clasp
	Queen Elizabeth Diamond Jubilee Medal	Awarded in 2012, Canadian version
	Canadian Forces' Decoration (CD)	Two clasp, 32 years of service
	Commemorative Medal for the Centennial of Saskatchewan	Awarded 27 May 2005

== Notes ==
Military offices
Preceded by Jonathan Vance	Chief of the Defence Staff; 2021	Succeeded by Wayne Eyre
Preceded by Ron Lloyd	Commander of the Royal Canadian Navy; 2019–2021	Succeeded by Craig Baines
Preceded by Gilles Couturier	Commander Maritime Forces Pacific; 2016–2018	Succeeded by J.R. Auchterlonie
