= Bob Auchterlonie =

Canadian admiral

Vice-Admiral Bob Auchterlonie CMM CD
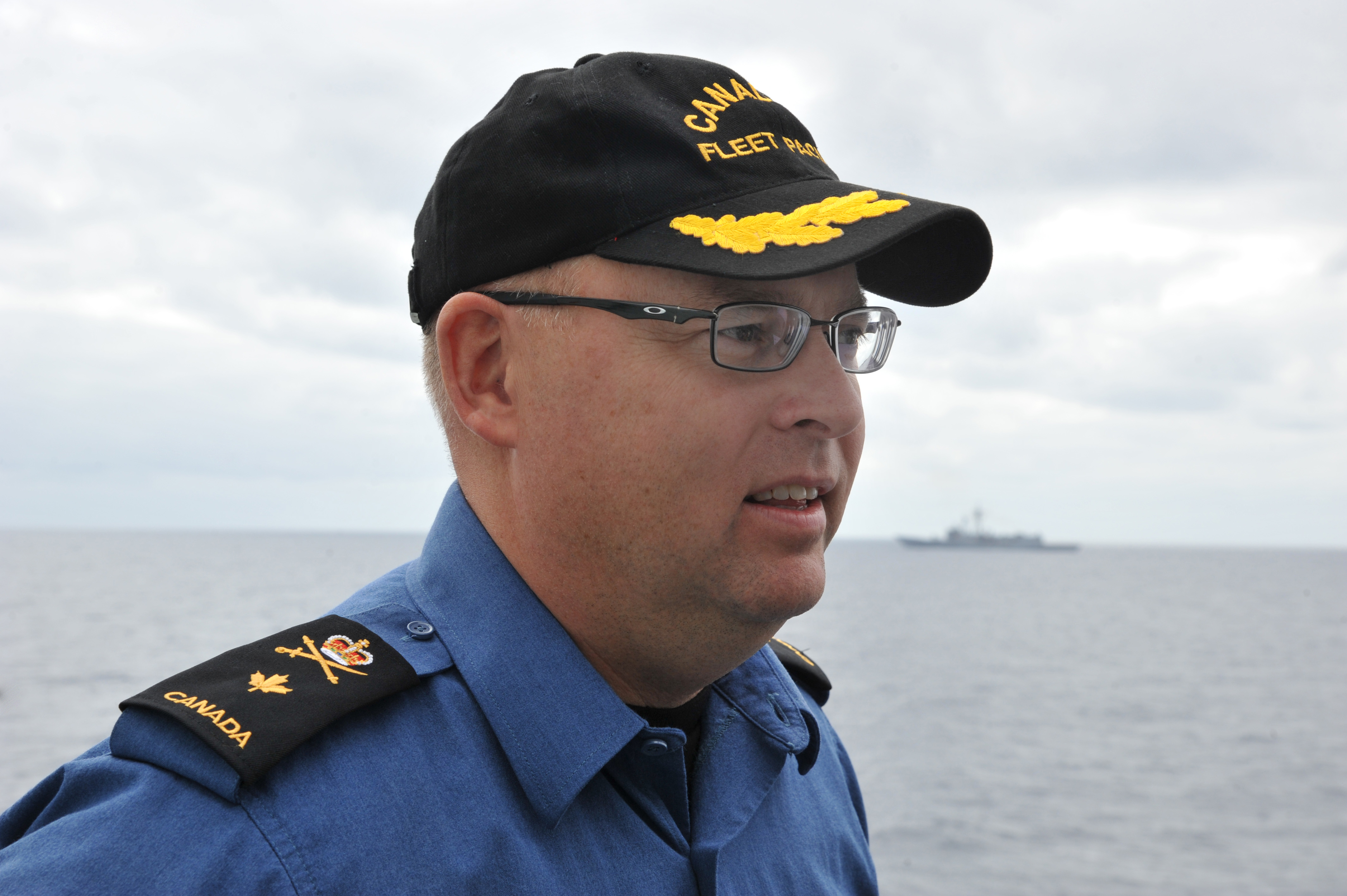
- Born: 25 July 1969 (age 57); Cumberland, British Columbia
- Military career
- Allegiance: Canada
- Branch: Royal Canadian Navy / Canadian Forces Maritime Command
- Service years: 1987–present
- Rank: Vice-Admiral
- Commands: Canadian Joint Operations Command (2021–Present); Maritime Forces Pacific (2018–2021); Canadian Fleet Pacific (2013–2015); Canadian Forces Base Esquimalt (2012–2013); HMCS Fredericton (2007–2009)
- Awards: Commander of the Order of Military Merit Canadian Forces' Decoration

Vice-Admiral J. Robert "Bob" Auchterlonie CMM CD (b. July 25, 1969) is a Royal Canadian Navy officer who is currently the Commander Canadian Joint Operations Command - CJOC since 18 June 2021.

== Education and career ==
Auchterlonie joined the Canadian Forces as a ROTP cadet in 1987 and graduated with a Masters in Defence Studies from Royal Military College of Canada in 1991, later completing studies at Canadian Forces Command and Staff College and Naval Command College at the US Naval War College.

He has served in vessels on both coasts for two decades and commanded HMCS Fredericton from 2007 to 2009.

He was previously Base Commander of CFB Esquimalt from 2012 to 2013 and then served as Commander Canadian Fleet Pacific from July 3, 2013 to June 24, 2015. On 18 June 2021 he became Commander Canadian Joint Operations Command - CJOC

== Personal ==
Auchterlonie was born in Cumberland, British Columbia and is a married father of two sons.

== Awards and decorations ==
Auchterlonie's personal awards and decorations included the following:

Ribbon	Description	Notes
	Order of Military Merit (CMM)	Appointed Commander (CMM) on 21 September 2020; Appointed Officer (OMM) on 26 September 2013
	Operational Service Medal (Canada) - Expedition	
	Special Service Medal	with NATO-OTAN Clasp
	Canadian Peacekeeping Service Medal	
	Queen Elizabeth Diamond Jubilee Medal	Decoration awarded in 2012; Canadian version
	Canadian Forces' Decoration (CD)	with two Clasp for 32 years of services

Military offices
Preceded by Scott Bishop	Commander Canadian Fleet Pacific; 2013–2015	Succeeded by Jeff Zwick
