= Darren Hawco =

Vice-Admiral Darren Hawco CMM MSM CD
- Military career
- Allegiance: Canada
- Branch: Royal Canadian Navy
- Service years: 1984 – 2020
- Rank: Vice-Admiral
- Commands: Canadian Fleet Atlantic; HMCS Ottawa
- Awards: Commander of the Order of Military Merit; Meritorious Service Medal; Canadian Forces' Decoration

Vice-Admiral Darren Carl Hawco CMM MSM CD is a former officer in the Royal Canadian Navy. He commanded HMCS Ottawa between 2006 and 2007. Later in his career he was Commander, Canadian Fleet Atlantic from 2012 to 2013, Director General of Cyber Warfare from 2013 to 2015, Chief of Force Development from 2015 to 2018, and Canada's Military Representative to NATO from 2018 to 2020. He retired from the navy in 2020.

== Awards and decorations ==
Hawco's personal awards and decorations include the following:

| Ribbon | Description | Notes |
| | Order of Military Merit (CMM) | Appointed Commander (CMM) on 12 October 2017 |
| | Meritorious Service Medal (MSM) | 1st Decoration awarded on 10 July 2007; 2nd Decoration awarded on 19 October 2017; Military division |
| | South-West Asia Service Medal | with AFGHANISTAN Clasp |
| | General Campaign Star | South West Asia Ribbon; 1 rotation bar |
| | Special Service Medal | with NATO-OTAN Clasp; with xxx Clasp |
| | Canadian Peacekeeping Service Medal | |
| | NATO Medal for the former Yugoslavia | with FORMER YUGOSLAVIA clasp |
| | Canadian Forces' Decoration (CD) | with two clasps for 32 years of service |
| | Meritorious Service Medal | Decoration awarded 4 December 2010; United States award |

Military offices
| Preceded by | Commander Canadian Fleet Atlantic; 2012–2013 | Succeeded by Scott Bishop |
