= Admiral (Canada) =

Rank in the Royal Canadian Navy

- Insignia
- Country: Canada
- Service branch: Royal Canadian Navy
- Abbreviation: ADM or Adm.
- Rank: Four-maple leaf (four-star)
- NATO rank code: OF-9
- Non-NATO rank: O-10
- Formation: 1910
- Next higher rank: Commander-in-Chief of the Canadian Armed Forces (highest)
- Next lower rank: Vice-admiral
- Equivalent ranks: General (Army and Air Force)

The rank of admiral in Canada is typically held by only one officer whose position is Chief of the Defence Staff and the senior uniformed officer of the Canadian Forces. It is equivalent to the army and air force rank of general.

The last naval officer to hold the rank of admiral and the position of Chief of the Defence Staff was Admiral John Rogers Anderson.

The current naval officer to hold the rank of admiral and the position of Chief of the Defence Staff is Admiral Art McDonald, as of January 14, 2021.

There have been three chiefs of the Defence Staff who have been an admiral:

- John Rogers Anderson
- Robert Hilborn Falls
- Art McDonald

Prince Philip held the rank of admiral in an honorary capacity and not an active regular member of the RCN from 2011 until his death in 2021.

Others have held the title but under different circumstances:

- Charles Kingsmill was an admiral for the director of Naval Services of Canada, a title that is now referred to as Commander of the Royal Canadian Navy.
- Percy W. Nelles was promoted admiral after his retirement as Chief of Naval Staff and was vice-admiral during active duty.

On May 5, 2010, the Canadian naval uniform dark dress tunic was adjusted, removing exterior epaulettes and reverting to the sleeve-ring and executive curl rank insignia used by a majority of navies throughout the world. This means that a Canadian admiral's dress tunic no longer bears a single broad stripe on the sleeve, with epaulettes on the shoulders, as was the case since unification (1968), but has a broad stripe plus three sleeve rings, without any epaulettes on the exterior of the tunic (cloth rank slip-ons are still worn on the uniform shirt underneath the tunic).

Navy uniform variations

Tunic rank insignia (2010-)

Uniform shirts

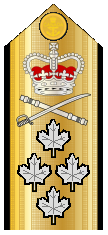
Short-sleeve white shirt and white dress tunic

CADPAT uniform

Dress uniform tunic between 1986 and 2010

== See also ==
- Flag officer
- Four-star rank
- Canadian Forces ranks and insignia
