= Rear admiral =

Senior naval flag officer rank

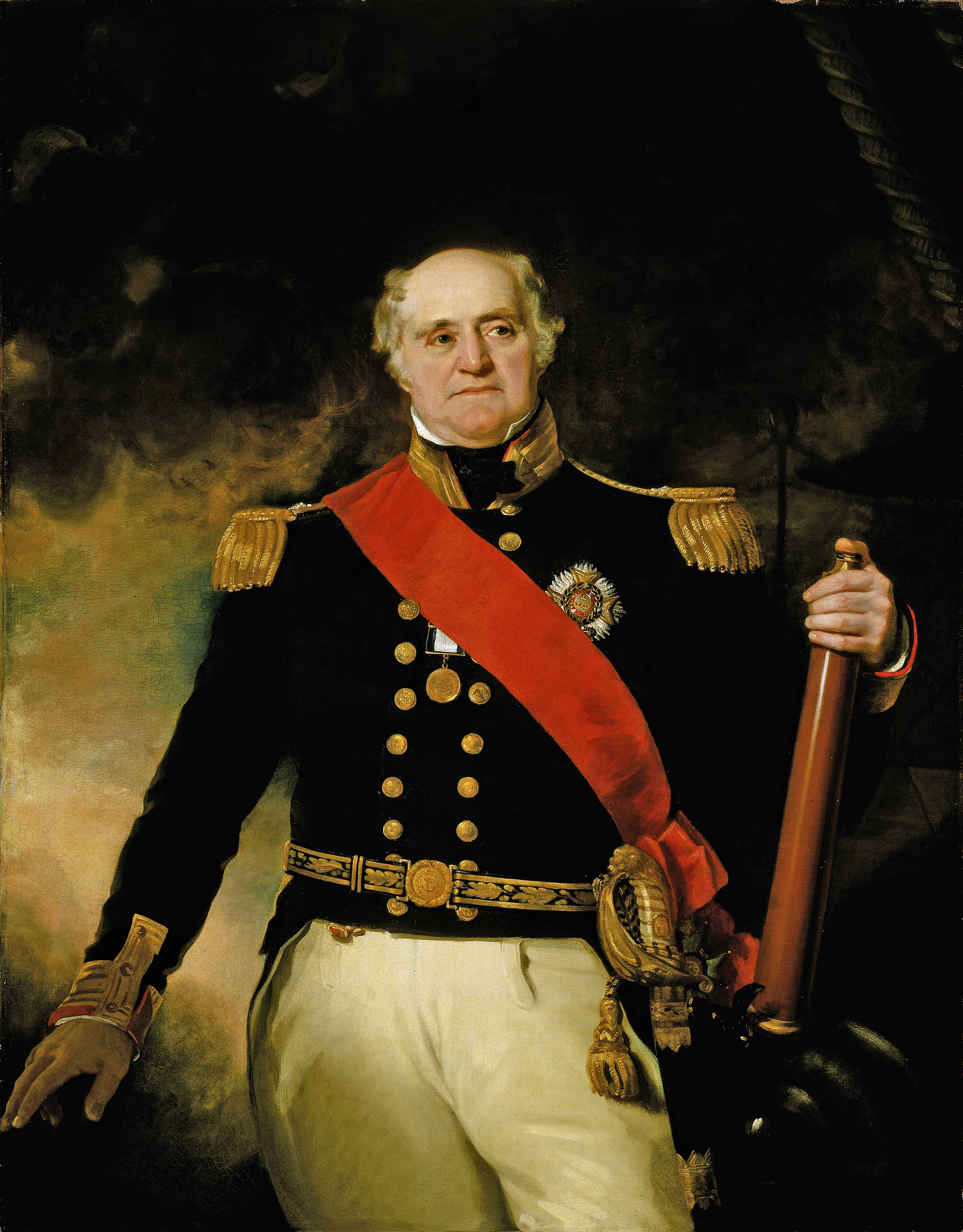
Portrait of Sir Thomas Hardy by Richard Evans, 1834. Hardy is shown in the full dress uniform of a Rear Admiral.

Rear admiral is a flag officer rank used by English-speaking navies. In most European navies, the equivalent rank is called counter admiral.

Rear admiral is usually immediately senior to commodore and immediately below vice admiral. It is usually equivalent to the rank of major general in armies. In the U.S. Navy and some other navies, there are two rear admiral ranks.

The term originated in the days of naval sailing squadrons and can trace its origins to the British Royal Navy. Each naval squadron was assigned an admiral as its head, who commanded from the centre vessel and directed the squadron's activities. The admiral would in turn be assisted by a vice admiral, who commanded the lead ships that bore the brunt of a battle. In the rear of the squadron, a third admiral commanded the remaining ships and, as this section was considered to be in the least danger, the admiral in command of it was typically the most junior. This has continued into the modern age, with rear admiral the most junior admiralty of many navies.

== Australia ==
The Royal Australian Navy maintains a rank of rear admiral; refer to Australian Defence Force ranks and insignia. The abbreviation is RADM.

Since the mid-1990s, the insignia of a Royal Australian Navy rear admiral is the Crown of St. Edward above a crossed sword and baton, above two silver stars, above the word "Australia". Like the Royal Navy version, the sword is a traditional naval cutlass. The stars have eight points, unlike the four pointed Order of the Bath stars used by the army (which are often referred to as "pips"). Prior to 1995, the RAN shoulder board was identical to the Royal Navy shoulder board. The Royal Navy shoulder board changed again in 2001 and the Australian and UK shoulder boards are now identical except for the word "Australia".

Rear Admiral Robyn Walker became the first female admiral in the Royal Australian Navy when she was appointed Surgeon-General of the Australian Defence Force on 16 December 2011.

== Canada ==
In the Royal Canadian Navy, the rank of rear-admiral (RAdm) (contre-amiral or CAm in French) is the Navy rank equivalent to major-general of the Army and Air Force. A rear-admiral is a flag officer, the naval equivalent of a general officer. A rear-admiral is senior to a commodore and brigadier-general, and junior to a vice-admiral and lieutenant-general.

The rank insignia for a rear-admiral is two silver maple leaves beneath a silver crossed sword and baton, all surmounted by St Edward's Crown, worn on gold shoulder boards on the white short-sleeved shirt or the tropical white tunic. The service dress features a wide strip of gold braid around the cuff and, since June 2010, above it a narrower strip of gold braid embellished with the executive curl. On the visor of the service cap are two rows of gold oak leaves.

Canadian rear admiral shoulder board and sleeve insignia (since June 2010)

Uniform shirts

CADPAT uniform

== Pakistan ==
A rear admiral in the Pakistani Navy is a senior and two-star rank naval officer, appointed in higher naval commands. Like most Commonwealth navies, the rear admiral rank is superior to commodore and captain. However, the rank is junior to the three-star rank vice-admiral and four-star rank admiral, who is generally a Chief of Naval Staff of the Navy.

== New Zealand ==
The highest ordinary rank currently filled in the Royal New Zealand Navy is rear admiral and this is the rank held by the Chief of Navy unless that person is also Chief of Defence Force.

== Singapore ==
The Republic of Singapore Navy (RSN) has two ranks with the title of rear admiral: rear-admiral (one-star), a one-star rank; and rear-admiral (two-star), a two-star rank.

== Sri Lanka ==
Rear admiral is a two-star rank in the Sri Lanka Navy.

== Sweden ==
In Sweden, rear admiral is a two-star admiral rank of the Swedish Navy.

== United Kingdom ==
The Royal Navy maintains a rank of rear admiral.

== United States ==
In the United States, there have been two ranks with the title of rear admiral since 1985: rear admiral (lower half) (RDML), a one-star rank; and rear admiral (RADM), a two-star rank. Prior to that, a combination of ranks was used. Both the rear admiral (lower half) and rear admiral ranks exist in four of the uniformed services of the United States: the United States Navy, United States Coast Guard, United States Public Health Service (USPHS) Commissioned Corps, and National Oceanic and Atmospheric Administration (NOAA) Commissioned Officer Corps.

== Admiral insignia by country ==
Rear admiral
(Royal Australian Navy)

Rear admiral
(Bangladesh Navy)

Rear admiral
(Belize Coast Guard)

Rear admiral
(French: Contre-amiral)
(Royal Canadian Navy)

ሬር አድሚራል
Rēri ādimīrali
(Ethiopian Navy)

Rear admiral
(Republic of Fiji Navy)

Rear admiral
(Gambian Navy)

Rear admiral
(Ghana Navy)

Rear admiral
(Guyana Coast Guard)

Rear admiral
(Indian Navy)

Rear admiral
(Irish: Seachaimiréal)
(Irish Naval Service)

Rear admiral
(Jamaican Coast Guard)

Rear admiral
(Namibian Navy)

Rear admiral
(Royal New Zealand Navy)

Rear admiral
(Nigerian Navy)

Rear admiral
(Urdu: بحریہ کا امیر, romanized: Bahriyah ka ameer)
(Pakistan Navy)

Rear admiral
(Papua New Guinea Maritime Element)

Rear admiral
(Philippine Navy)

Rear admiral
(Sierra Leone Navy)

Rear admiral
(Republic of Singapore Navy)

Rear admiral
(South African Navy)

Rear admiral
(Sri Lanka Navy)

Rear admiral
(Tanzania Naval Command)

Rear admiral
(Trinidad and Tobago Coast Guard)

Rear admiral
(Royal Navy)

Rear admiral
(United States Navy)

Rear admiral
(United States Coast Guard)

== See also ==
- Ranks and insignia of officers of NATO navies
