= 2016 Canadian honours =

Canadian government recognitions

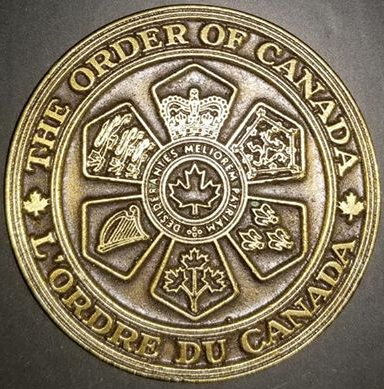
The Seal of the Order of Canada

The following are the appointments to various Canadian Honours of 2016. Usually, they are announced as part of the New Year and Canada Day celebrations and are published within the Canada Gazette during year. This follows the custom set out within the United Kingdom which publishes its appoints of various British Honours for New Year's and for monarch's official birthday. However, instead of the midyear appointments announced on Victoria Day, the official birthday of the Canadian Monarch, this custom has been transferred with the celebration of Canadian Confederation and the creation of the Order of Canada.

However, as the Canada Gazette publishes appointment to various orders, decorations and medal, either Canadian or from Commonwealth and foreign states, this article will reference all Canadians so honoured during the 2016 calendar year.

Provincial Honours are not listed within the Canada Gazette, however they are listed within the various publications of each provincial government. Provincial honours are listed within the page.

== The Order of Canada ==
=== Termination of an appointment of the Order of Canada ===
- Ranjit Kumar Chandra

=== Companions of the Order of Canada ===
Undress ribbon of a Companion of the Order of Canada

- Brenda Andrews, C.C.
- The Honourable Lloyd Axworthy, P.C., C.C., O.M. - This is a promotion within the Order
- Atom Egoyan, C.C. - This is a promotion within the Order
- Angela Hewitt, C.C. - This is a promotion within the Order
- Margaret MacMillan, C.C. - This is a promotion within the Order
- Arthur B. McDonald, C.C., O.Ont. - This is a promotion within the Order
- Barbara Sherwood Lollar, C.C.

=== Officer of the Order of Canada ===
Undress ribbon of an Officer of the Order of Canada

- Marcel Boyer, O.C.
- Julie Dickson, O.C.
- Nassif Ghoussoub, O.C.
- Magella Gros-Louis, O.C., O.Q.
- Dany Laferrière, O.C., O.Q.
- Guy Latraverse, O.C., C.Q.
- Brian M. Levitt, O.C.
- Richard H. McLaren, O.C.
- Daniel Poliquin, O.C. - This is a promotion within the Order
- The Honourable Richard Scott, O.C., O.M.
- Frances Alice Shepherd, O.C.
- Jennifer Anne Stoddart, O.C.
- Donald John Taylor, O.C. - This is a promotion within the Order
- Mary Anne White, O.C.
- Kenneth Armson, O.C.
- Ellen Bialystok, O.C.
- Yvon Charest, O.C.
- Gregory Charles, O.C.
- John Richard English, O.C. - This is a promotion within the Order
- Eduardo L. Franco, O.C.
- Jacques Godbout, O.C., C.Q.
- Serge Godin, O.C., O.Q. - This is a promotion within the Order
- Robert Arthur Gordon, O.C., O.Ont.
- Philippe Gros, O.C.
- Piers Handling, O.C., O.Ont.
- Roberta Jamieson, O.C. - This is a promotion within the Order
- Nathalie Lambert, O.C.
- Andres Lozano, O.C.
- John McCall MacBain, O.C.
- John McGarry, O.C.
- Rene Theophile Nuytten, O.C., O.B.C.
- The Honourable Dennis R. O'Connor, O.C.
- Sophie May Pierre, O.C., O.B.C.
- Thomas Quinn, O.C.
- Noralou Roos, O.C. - This is a promotion within the Order
- Abraham Anghik Ruben, O.C.
- Tsun-Kong Sham, O.C.
- Dorothy Shaw, O.C.
- Anthony von Mandl, O.C., O.B.C.
- The Honourable Warren Winkler, O.C., O.Ont.
- Ronald J. Wonnacott, O.C.

=== Members of the Order of Canada ===
Undress ribbon for a Member of the Order of Canada

- George Baird, C.M.
- Bernard Bélanger, C.M.
- David Bissett, C.M., A.O.E.
- Denise Bombardier, C.M., C.Q.
- Joseph Boyden, C.M.
- Laura Brandon, C.M.
- Sophie Brochu, C.M.
- Phyllis Bruce, C.M.
- Rudy Buttignol, C.M.
- Barbara Byers, C.M.
- The Honourable Catherine Callbeck, C.M.
- Robert Campbell, C.M.
- Susan M. W. Cartwright, C.M.
- Antoni Cimolino, C.M.
- Jack L. Cockwell, C.M.
- Patricia Cranton, C.M.
- The Honourable Joseph Z. Daigle, C.M.
- Wade Davis, C.M.
- Rollande Desbois, C.M.
- Diane Dufresne, C.M., C.Q.
- Ivan Kenneth Eyre, C.M., O.M.
- Meric Gertler, C.M.
- Ted Grant, C.M.
- Barbara Hall, C.M.
- Odetta Heyn, C.M.
- Jean-Marc Lalonde, C.M.
- Pierre H. Lessard, C.M.
- Peter S. Li, C.M.
- Rohinton Mistry, C.M.
- John Mulvihill, C.M.
- Marie-José Nadeau, C.M.
- Audrey O'Brien, C.M.
- Sandra Paikowsky, C.M.
- Erna Paris, C.M.
- Helen Fogwill Porter, C.M.
- Placide Poulin, C.M.
- Louise Richer, C.M.
- Kent Roach, C.M.
- Cathy Roozen, C.M., A.O.E.
- Morris Rosenberg, C.M.
- Fiona Amaryllis Sampson, C.M.
- P. Kim Sturgess, C.M.
- Noreen Taylor, C.M.
- Faye Thomson, C.M.
- Peter Valentine, C.M.
- Helen Vari, C.M.
- Douglas Ward, C.M.
- Richard Weber, C.M.
- Frederic Wien, C.M.
- Joseph Georges Arsenault, C.M., O.P.E.I.
- Salah John Bachir, C.M.
- Isabel Bassett, C.M., O.Ont.
- Gerald Batist, C.M.
- Geoffrey Battersby, C.M.
- Françoise Baylis, C.M.
- Gregory S. Belton, C.M., C.V.O.
- Johanne Berry, C.M.
- Timothy Borlase, C.M., O.N.L.
- Richard Frederick Bradshaw, C.M.
- Peter Bregg, C.M.
- Donald C. Brinton, C.M.
- Michael Budman, C.M.
- Cassie Campbell, C.M.
- Mariette Carrier-Fraser, C.M.
- Sharon Carstairs, P.C., C.M.
- Neena L. Chappell, C.M.
- Zita Cobb, C.M.
- Mary Cornish, C.M.
- L. Mark Cullen, C.M.
- Madeleine Delaney-LeBlanc, C.M.
- Patricia Demers, C.M.
- Serge Denoncourt, C.M.
- Charlotte Diamond, C.M.
- Rupert James Duchesne, C.M.
- Michael Eskin, C.M.
- Carole Anne Estabrooks, C.M.
- Yvon Ethier, C.M.
- Gerald Richard Fagan, C.M., O.Ont.
- Linda Marie Fedigan, C.M.
- Marie Esther Fortier, C.M.
- Stephen Gaetz, C.M.
- Ned Goodman, C.M.
- Don Green, C.M.
- Paul John Perry Guloien, C.M.
- Barbara Hannigan, C.M.
- Gregory Hanson, C.M.
- Susan Johnson, C.M.
- Diane Juster, C.M.
- Eli Kassner, C.M.
- Elaine Keillor, C.M.
- Hassan Khosrowshahi, C.M., O.B.C.
- Michael Charles Klein, C.M.
- Laurier Lacroix, C.M.
- Mark Levine, C.M.
- Shar Levine, C.M.
- Sidney B. Linden, C.M., O.Ont.
- Gail Dexter Lord, C.M.
- Steve Lurie, C.M.
- Bruce MacKinnon, C.M., O.N.S.
- Harriet MacMillan, C.M.
- Joe Mancini, C.M.
- Stephanie Mancini, C.M.
- Roger L. Martin, C.M.
- Don McKellar, C.M.
- Linda E. McKnight, C.M.
- Emily Molnar, C.M.
- Terrence Montague, C.M., C.D.
- Richard Ian Guy Morrison, C.M.
- The Honourable Graydon Nicholas, C.M., O.N.B
- Niels Ole Nielsen, C.M.
- Shane O'Dea, C.M., O.N.L.
- Robert Pace, C.M.
- Eric Peterson, C.M.
- Michel Picher, C.M.
- Deborah Poff, C.M.
- Andrew M. Pringle, C.M.
- Daniel Reiss, C.M.
- Howard Warren Rundle, C.M.
- Robert J. Sawyer, C.M.
- Kathryn Shields, C.M., O.B.C.
- Ilkay Silk, C.M.
- Jean Swanson, C.M.
- Kathleen Patricia Taylor, C.M.
- Richard Tremblay, C.M., C.Q.
- Louis Vachon, C.M.
- The Honourable Geraldine Van Bibber, C.M.
- David Vaver, C.M.
- James W. St. G. Walker, C.M.
- Michael A. Walker, C.M.
- Howard Wetston, C.M.
- Catharine Whiteside, C.M.
- Marie Wilson, C.M.
- James G. Wright, C.M.
- Glenda Yeates, C.M.

== Order of Military Merit ==
=== Commanders of the Order of Military Merit ===
Undress ribbon for a Commander of the Order of Military Merit

- Lieutenant-General Michael John Hood, C.M.M., C.D.
- Major-General Christian Juneau, C.M.M., M.S.M, C.D. - This is a promotion within the Order
- Rear-Admiral John Frederick Newton, C.M.M., M.S.M, C.D. - This is a promotion within the Order
- Rear-Admiral William Truelove, C.M.M., C.D. - This is a promotion within the Order
- Lieutenant-General Christine Theresa Whitecross, C.M.M., M.S.M, C.D. - This is a promotion within the Order

=== Officers of the Order of Military Merit ===
Undress ribbon for an Officer of the Order of Military Merit

- Lieutenant-Colonel Roy Armstrong, O.M.M., C.D.
- Colonel Timothy James Bishop, O.M.M., M.S.M., C.D.
- Colonel Marie Annabelle Jennie Carignan, O.M.M., M.S.M., C.D.
- Colonel Peter Samson Dawe, O.M.M., M.S.M., C.D.
- Brigadier-General Luis Alberto Botelho de Sousa, O.M.M., C.D.
- Lieutenant-Colonel George Heber Gillam, O.M.M., C.D.
- Lieutenant-Colonel Carla Harding, O.M.M., C.D.
- Captain(N) Joseph Jeannot Hervé Jean, O.M.M., C.D.
- Major Joseph Fernand Phillippe Leclerc, O.M.M., M.S.M., C.D.
- Major John Allison Lewis, O.M.M., C.D.
- Colonel David William Lowthian, O.M.M., M.S.M., C.D.
- Colonel Derek Alan Macaulay, O.M.M., C.D.
- Colonel Scott Andrew Mcleod, O.M.M., M.S.M., C.D.
- Captain(N) Marta Beattie Mulkins, O.M.M., C.D.
- Brigadier-General Joseph Paul Alain Pelletier, O.M.M., M.S.M., C.D.
- Brigadier-General Neville Edward Russell, O.M.M., C.D.
- Colonel Érick David Simoneau, O.M.M., M.S.M., C.D.
- Colonel Michel-Henri St-Louis, O.M.M., M.S.M., C.D.
- Colonel Robert Daren Keith Walker, O.M.M., M.S.C., C.D.
- Lieutenant-Commander John Aubrey Williston, O.M.M., M.S.M., C.D.
- Captain(N) Jeffery Blair Zwick, O.M.M., C.D.

=== Members of the Order of Military Merit ===
Undress ribbon for a Member of the Order of Military Merit

- Chief Petty Officer 1st Class David Ronald Arsenault, M.M.M., C.D.
- Sergeant Stephen Claude Joseph Bates, M.M.M., C.D.
- Chief Warrant Officer Robert Joseph Beaudry, M.M.M., C.D.
- Warrant Officer Timothee David Bérubé, M.M.M., M.M.V., C.D.
- Warrant Officer Morgan Frans Biderman, M.M.M., C.D.
- Chief Warrant Officer Mario Paul Bizier, M.M.M., C.D.
- Chief Petty Officer 2nd Class Colin Philip Bond, M.M.M., C.D.
- Chief Warrant Officer Joseph Jacques Boucher, M.M.M., C.D.
- Warrant Officer Joseph Serge François Brunet, M.M.M., C.D.
- Master Warrant Officer Todd Barry Buchanan, M.M.M., M.S.M., C.D.
- Chief Warrant Officer Willard John Buchanan, M.M.M., C.D.
- Major Lucie Marie Françoise Burelle, M.M.M., C.D.
- Chief Petty Officer 1st Class Norman William Cawthra, M.M.M., C.D.
- Chief Warrant Officer Marc André Corriveau, M.M.M., C.D.
- Chief Warrant Officer Edward Joseph John Curtis, M.M.M., C.D.
- Warrant Officer Scott Alexander Daigle, M.M.M., C.D.
- Chief Warrant Officer Mary Elizabeth Demetruk, M.M.M., C.D.
- Captain Joseph Robert Alain Deslauriers, M.M.M., C.D.
- Warrant Officer Stephen Gerald Deveau, M.M.M., C.D.
- Warrant Officer Winston Wade Dominie, M.M.M., C.D.
- Master Warrant Officer Dianne Margaret Doyle, M.M.M., C.D.
- Master Warrant Officer Andrew Jack Durnford, M.M.M., C.D.
- Master Warrant Officer Dana Robert Eagles, M.M.M., C.D.
- Warrant Officer Joseph Gaetan Philippe Dessureault jr., M.M.M., C.D.
- Master Warrant Officer Michael Patrick Forest, M.M.M., M.S.M., C.D.
- Master Warrant Officer Michael Fuentespina, M.M.M., C.D.
- Ranger Donald Gourlay, M.M.M., C.D.
- Petty Officer 2nd Class John Vincent Cotter Gouthro, M.M.M., C.D.
- Warrant Officer Tracy Leigh Shyan Graham, M.M.M., C.D.
- Captain Kevin Wayne Gregory, M.M.M., C.D.
- Warrant Officer Renee Hansen, M.M.M., C.D.
- Chief Petty Officer 2nd Class Stephen Harold Haughn, M.M.M., C.D.
- Warrant Officer Jonathan Douglas Hawtin, M.M.M., C.D.
- Chief Warrant Officer Darren John Hessell, M.M.M., C.D.
- Chief Warrant Officer Garth Edward Hoegi, M.M.M., C.D.
- Captain Carl Homer, M.M.M., C.D.
- Warrant Officer Kimberlee Jones, M.M.M., C.D.
- Warrant Officer Cory Grant Kavanagh, M.M.M., C.D.
- Chief Warrant Officer Joseph Réal Luc Lacombe, M.M.M., C.D.
- Chief Warrant Officer Joseph Robert Bernard Lafontaine, M.M.M., C.D.
- Master Warrant Officer William Edward Lang, M.M.M., C.D.
- Master Warrant Officer Gary Steven Leblanc, M.M.M., C.D.
- Major Line Michele Lebœuf, M.M.M., C.D.
- Chief Warrant Officer Joseph Germain Daniel Legault, M.M.M., C.D.
- Warrant Officer Patrick André Lemieux, M.M.M., C.D.
- Master Warrant Officer Grant Clarence Lewis, M.M.M., C.D.
- Petty Officer 1st Class Marie Stephanie Dawn Mackay, M.M.M., C.D.
- Warrant Officer Karen Margaret MacLean, M.M.M., C.D.
- Master Warrant Officer Nadia MacQueen, M.M.M., C.D.
- Warrant Officer Joseph James William Lorne McAdam, M.M.M., C.D.
- Chief Petty Officer 2nd Class David Kenneth McAlpine, M.M.M., C.D.
- Master Warrant Officer Mark Douglas Mclennan, M.M.M., C.D.
- Master Warrant Officer Patrick William Moran, M.M.M., C.D.
- Lieutenant Karen Deborah Mullen, M.M.M., C.D.
- Major David Arthur Muralt, M.M.M., C.D.
- Master Warrant Officer Thomas Kincaid Neill, M.M.M., C.D.
- Warrant Officer Robert Harold John Peldjak, M.M.M., C.D.
- Chief Warrant Officer Joseph Gerald Donald Pelletier, M.M.M., C.D.
- Warrant Officer Alessandro Pacifico Pellizzari, M.M.M., C.D.
- Major Jaime Phillips, M.M.M., C.D.
- Master Warrant Officer Didier Jean-Paul Louis Pignatel, M.M.M., C.D.
- Sergeant Jeremy Pinchin, M.M.M., S.M.V., C.D.
- Warrant Officer Claude Pierre Provost, M.M.M., C.D.
- Master Warrant Officer Wallace Rideout, M.M.M., C.D.
- Major Mark William Rosin, M.M.M., C.D.
- Warrant Officer Stuart John Dalton Russelle, M.M.M., C.D.
- Chief Warrant Officer Jeffrey Harold Saunders, M.M.M., C.D.
- Ranger Martin Scott, M.M.M., C.D.
- Master Warrant Officer Keith Alan Sexstone, M.M.M., C.D.
- Ranger Stanley Robert Stephens, M.M.M., C.D.
- Captain Thomas Henry Sutton, M.M.M., C.D.
- Chief Warrant Officer Robert Peter Michael Talach, M.M.M., C.D.
- Major Douglas Michael Thorlakson, M.M.M., C.D.
- Chief Warrant Officer Christopher Todd Tucker, M.M.M., C.D.
- Warrant Officer Kirby Graham Vincent, M.M.M., C.D.
- Petty Officer 2nd Class Jody Patrick Waterfield, M.M.M., C.D.
- Captain Patrick Joseph White, M.M.M., C.D.
- Chief Warrant Officer Michael James Whitman, M.M.M., C.D.
- Master Warrant Officer Grace Lydia Wille, M.M.M., C.D.
- Chief Petty Officer 2nd Class David Wilson, M.M.M., C.D.

== Order of Merit of the Police Forces ==
=== Commander of the Order of Merit of the Police Forces ===
Undress ribbon of a Commander of the Order of Merit of the Police Forces

- Commissioner J. Vincent N. Hawkes, C.O.M. - This is a promotion within the Order

=== Officers of the Order of Merit of the Police Forces ===
Undress ribbon of an Officer of the Order of Merit of the Police Forces

- Deputy Commissioner Bradley Blair, O.O.M.
- Deputy Commissioner Craig Steven MacMillan, O.O.M. - This is a promotion within the Order
- Chief Douglas A. Palson, O.O.M.
- Chief Superintendent Jennifer Anne Strachan, O.O.M.

=== Members of the Order of Merit of the Police Forces ===
Undress ribbon of a Member of the Order of Merit of the Police Forces

- Chief Superintendent Rosemary Abbruzzese, M.O.M.
- Chief Terry Ray Armstrong, M.O.M.
- Superintendent Paul A. Beesley, M.O.M.
- Daniel J. Bowman, M.O.M.
- Sergeant Howard James Burns, M.O.M.
- Corps Sergeant Major Darren C. Campbell, M.O.M.
- Inspector Lawrence Cope, M.O.M.
- Superintendent Joseph Bernard Serge Côté, M.O.M.
- Chief Stephen E. Covey, M.O.M.
- Chief Superintendent David Thomas Critchley, M.O.M.
- Sergeant Robert C. Daly, M.O.M.
- Superintendent Kari Dart, M.O.M.
- Director Denis Desroches, M.O.M.
- Chief Shawn Devine, M.O.M.
- Susan C. Double, M.O.M.
- Deputy Chief Nishan J. Duraiappah, M.O.M.
- Inspector Stuart K. Eley, M.O.M.
- Deputy Chief Timothy Farquharson, M.O.M.
- Inspector Patrick S. Flanagan, M.O.M.
- Staff Sergeant Douglas Frank Gambicourt, M.O.M.
- Chief Constable Ralph Leonard Goerke, M.O.M.
- Superintendent Nancy Goodes-Ritchie, M.O.M.
- Superintendent James Ian Hardy, M.O.M.
- Chief Constable Wayne Douglas Holland, M.O.M.
- Staff Sergeant Douglas James Houston, M.O.M.
- Staff Sergeant Wilfred E. Hurren, M.O.M.
- Deputy Chief David Jarvis, M.O.M.
- Inspector Edmund P. Kodis, M.O.M.
- Deputy Director Bernard Lamothe, M.O.M.
- Chief Bryan M. Larkin, M.O.M.
- Staff Sergeant Robert Ellwood Lemon, M.O.M.
- Inspector David J. Lucas, M.O.M.
- Sergeant Stephen MacDonald, M.O.M.
- Superintendent Mandip Singh Mann, M.O.M.
- Constable David Marchand, M.O.M.
- Superintendent Glenn Arnold Martindale, M.O.M.
- Sergeant David Bruce Muirhead, M.O.M.
- Corporal Jacques M. A. Neri, M.O.M.
- Staff Superintendent Randall Patrick, M.O.M.
- Inspector Jamie Alan David Pearce, M.O.M.
- Sergeant Denis Perrier, M.O.M.
- Chief Superintendent Richard A. J. Philbin, M.O.M.
- Chief Inspector Pierre Pinel, M.O.M.
- Chief Darryl J. Pinnell, M.O.M.
- Sergeant Clifford T. Priest, M.O.M.
- Deputy Chief Constable Satwinder Rai, M.O.M.
- Staff Sergeant Brian John Reed, M.O.M.
- Inspector Daniel W. Ritchie, M.O.M.
- Staff Sergeant Thomas Robb, M.O.M.
- Superintendent John Alfred Robin, M.O.M.
- Inspector David B. Saunders, M.O.M.
- Commander David Shane, M.O.M.
- Lisa Shipley, M.O.M.
- Superintendent Konrad Lionel Shourie, M.O.M.
- Sergeant Marty Roy Singleton, M.O.M.
- Superintendent Guy Warwick Slater, M.O.M.
- Superintendent Hilton Basil Smee, M.O.M.
- Superintendent Wayne Alexander Sutherland, M.O.M.
- Sergeant Robert Montgomery Tan, M.O.M.
- Inspector Karl Thomas, M.O.M.
- Chief Superintendent Sandra Anne Thomas, M.O.M.
- Deputy Chief Paul VandeGraaf, M.O.M.
- Staff Sergeant Lauren Weare, M.O.M.
- Sergeant William Michael James Whalen, M.O.M.
- Constable Andrew Preston Wilder, M.O.M.
- Superintendent Peter C. Yuen, M.O.M.

== Most Venerable Order of the Hospital of St. John of Jerusalem ==
Undress ribbon for all grades of the Most Venerable Order of the Hospital of St. John of Jerusalem

=== Knights and Dames of the Order of St. John ===
- Her Honour the Honourable Jocelyne Roy-Vienneau, O.N.B.
- Her Honour the Honourable Lois Mitchell, C.M., A.O.E.
- Her Honour the Honourable Janice Filmon, C.M., O.M.
- Herman Hung Choi Ho, M.B., BC
- Commander (Retired) Alaric John Martin Woodrow, C.D., R.C.N.
- His Honour the Honourable Joseph Michel Doyon, Q.C.

=== Commanders of the Order of St. John ===
- Adam James Dickinson Carter, ON
- Anthony Owen Lea, ON
- Richard Joseph Neville, ON
- Douglas Anthony Alberts, ON
- Alan Thomas Blundell, ON
- Nancy Katherine Hutchinson, ON
- Stewart Kellock, M.O.M., C.D., ON
- Michael John Lawrence, ON

=== Officers of the Order of St. John ===
- Robert Boily, QC
- Judith Anne Burtch, ON
- Pierre Fluet, QC
- Edmond Youie-Man Lee, BC
- Kristeen McKee, ON
- Karen Marie Mueller, ON
- John Buckingham Newman, ON
- Sonia Sizto, BC
- Sherry Lynn Versnick, ON
- Hubert William Dawe, NL
- Harvey Fields, ON
- Kevin Morgan, ON
- Sergeant Renee Anthony Ongcangco, ON

=== Members of the Order of St. John ===
- Richard William Spuzak, SK
- Daniel Blouin, QC
- Thomas William Carrique, ON
- Kenneth Kin Kuen Chan, BC
- Deborah Ann Coligan, ON
- Gareth Nicholas Gilson, BC
- Chief Warrant Officer John William Haldorson, C.D., BC
- Harriet May McFadyean Hay, BC
- Susan Sara Joy Hicks, ON
- Deborah Ann Howard, ON
- Patricia Anne Ireland, ON
- Major Bradley Donald Kempston, C.D., ON
- Justin Stephen Migchels, ON
- Jaroslaw Piwowarczyk, ON
- Master Corporal Érick Joseph Roger Ulderic Roberge, ON
- Lieutenant-Colonel (Retired) Jeffrey Frances Shaver, C.D., ON
- James Arthur Skinner, BC
- Jon Steven Warland, ON
- Lieutenant(N) (Retired) Patrick Alan Warner, C.D., ON
- Brian Baker, ON
- Peter Harvey Dwight Blok, ON
- Mary Patricia Murray Brown, BC
- James Daniel Coucill, SK
- Lori Lynn Coverdale, ON
- Kanisha Cayla Cruz-Kan, MB
- Erin Dembinski, ON
- Alison Dale Dery, MB
- Michael Joseph Gosselin, ON
- Major (Retired) Louis Ernest Grimshaw, C.D., ON
- Mary Kingston, NS
- Claire Elizabeth Mackley, MB
- Karen Joanne McGlashan, ON
- Frederick William Musselwhite, BC
- Sheena Margaret Osborne, BC
- Jemimah Zion Del Mundo Pangan, MB
- John Gregory Peters, MVO, ON
- Ken Reid, NL
- Jessie Erin Rumble, ON
- Anthony Richard Schindle, BC
- Andrew Wright Stanzel, ON
- Jillian Louise Stevenson, ON
- Sing Lim Yeo, O.B.C., BC

== Provincial Honours ==
=== National Order of Québec ===
==== Grand Officers of the National Order of Québec ====
Undress ribbon for a Grand Officer of the National Order of Québec

- Alanis Obomsawin, G.O.Q.
- Louise Otis, G.O.Q.

==== Officers of the National Order of Québec ====
Undress ribbon for an Officer of the National Order of Québec

- Serge Bouchard, O.Q.
- Louise Dandurand, O.Q.
- Denis de Belleval, O.Q.
- Gilles Duceppe, O.Q.
- The Honourable Liza Frulla, P.C., O.Q.
- Jean Grondin, O.Q.
- Fernand Ouellette, O.Q.
- André Parent, O.Q.
- John Parisella, O.Q.
- Robert Parizeau, O.Q.
- Lorraine Pintal, O.Q.

===== Honorary Officer of the National Order of Québec =====
- Patrick Bruel, O.Q.

==== Knight of the National Order of Québec ====
Undress ribbon for a Knight of the National Order of Québec

- Violette Alarie, C.Q.
- Gerald Batist, C.Q.
- Jean Beaudin, C.Q.
- Léopold Beaulieu, C.Q.
- Mohamed Benhaddadi, C.Q.
- Michel Bergeron, C.Q.
- Boucar Diouf, C.Q.
- Anne-Marie Dussault, C.Q.
- Jacques Fortin, C.Q.
- Jean-François Lapointe, C.Q.
- Rakia Laroui, C.Q.
- Alain Pinsonneault, C.Q.
- Placide Poulin, C.Q.
- Dominique Rankin, C.Q.
- Sister Angèle Rizzardo, C.Q.
- Hélène Sioui Trudel, C.Q.
- Yves Sirois, C.Q.
- Bruny Surin, C.Q.
- Laure Waridel, C.Q.
- Jean Wilkins, C.Q.

===== Honorary Knight of the National Order of Québec =====
- Carlos Eduardo Represas de Almeida, C.Q.

=== Saskatchewan Order of Merit ===
Undress ribbon for a member of the Saskatchewan Order of Merit

- JoAnne Bannatyne-Cugnet, S.O.M.
- Valerie Creighton, S.O.M.
- Steve Dechka, S.O.M.
- Keith Downey, O.C., F.R.S.C., S.O.M.
- Isabelle Impey, S.O.M.
- George Lafond, S.O.M.
- Eldon McIntyre, S.O.M.
- Wilf Perreault, S.O.M.
- Gordon Rawlinson, C.M., S.O.M.

=== Order of Ontario ===
Undress ribbon for a member of the Order of Ontario

- Peter A. Adamson – Surgical Specialist in Otolaryngology
- Mehran Anvari – Surgical Robotics Pioneer
- Donovan Bailey – Track and Field Icon
- Jennifer Bond – Professor of Law and Human Rights Advocate
- Angèle Brunelle – Advocate for Northwest Ontario's Francophone Community
- Ronald F. Caza – Lawyer and Defender of Francophone Linguistic Rights
- Anthony Kam Chuen Chan – Pediatric Hematologist and Scientist
- Ethel Côté – Entrepreneur, Volunteer and Community leader
- Jim Estill – Entrepreneur and Philanthropist
- Carol Finlay – Anglican Priest and Education Advocate
- Cheryl Forchuk – Scholar in the Fields of Homelessness, Poverty and Mental Health
- Dorothée Gizenga – International Development Expert and Human Rights Advocate
- Shirley Greenberg – Lawyer and Women's Rights Advocate
- Robert Pio Hajjar – Motivational Speaker
- Greta Hodgkinson – Prima Ballerina
- Dorothy Anna Jarvis – Pediatrician
- Lisa LaFlamme – Broadcast Journalist
- M.G. Venkatesh Mannar – Expert in Food Science Technologies and Nutrition
- Ernest Matton (Little Brown Bear) – Community Capacity Builder and Spiritual Ambassador
- Dennis O'Connor – former Associate Chief Justice of Ontario
- David Pearson – Professor and Promoter of Science Communication
- Fran Rider – Women's Hockey Advocate
- Beverley Salmon – Anti-Racism and Community Activist
- Hugh Segal – Public Servant
- Helga Stephenson – Arts Administrator and Human Rights Activist
- Margo Timmins – Vocalist

=== Order of British Columbia ===
Undress ribbon for a member of the Order of British Columbia

- Dr. Allen Eaves
- Saleema Noon
- Janet Austin
- John Mann
- Dr. Peter Wong
- Robert Robinson
- David Sidoo
- Brian R.D. Smith
- Pauline Rafferty
- Frank Giustra
- Kim Baird
- Beverley Boys
- Cornelia Hahn Oberlander
- Marjorie White
- Sandra Richardson
- Dr. Eric M. Yoshida

=== Alberta Order of Excellence ===
Undress ribbon for a member of the Alberta Order of Excellence

- Barry Bultz
- Linda Hughes
- Sheldon Kennedy
- Leroy Little Bear
- Michael Massey
- Paulette Patterson
- Shirley Penner
- Bill Yuill

=== Order of Prince Edward Island ===
Undress ribbon for a member of the Order of Prince Edward Island

- Ms. Carolyn Bateman
- Keptin John Joe Sark
- Dr. Dagny Dryer

=== Order of Manitoba ===
Undress ribbon for a member of the Order of Manitoba

- Paul Albrechtsen
- Marileen Bartlett
- Maria De Nardi
- Dhali H. S. Dhaliwal
- Betsy V. Kennedy
- Gary P. Kobinger
- Wanda Koop
- Reggie Leach
- Bernadette Smith
- Susan A. Thompson
- Wanbdi Wakita

=== Order of New Brunswick ===
Undress ribbon for a member of the Order of New Brunswick

- Chief Kenneth Barlow
- John P. Barry
- Judith Chernin Budovitch
- Phil Comeau
- Gérard Friolet
- Dr. Abraham Gesner
- Nancy Hartling
- Deborah Lyons
- Jean-Guy Rioux
- Dr. Sheldon H. Rubin

=== Order of Nova Scotia ===
Undress ribbon for a member of the Order of Nova Scotia

- Françoise Elvina Baylis, CM, ONS, PhD, FRSC, FCAHS
- Freeman Douglas Knockwood (Deceased), ONS, DHum (Hon)
- Arthur Bruce McDonald, CC, OOnt, ONS, FRS, FRSC
- James Leonard Morrow, ONS, DHum (Hon)
- Donald R. Reid (Deceased), ONS

=== Order of Newfoundland and Labrador ===
Undress ribbon for a member of the Order of Newfoundland and Labrador

- Dr. Noel Browne
- Thomas J. Foran
- William D. Mahoney, OMM, CD
- Melba Rabinowitz
- Philip Riteman, ONS
- Cheryl Stagg
- Kellie Walsh
- The Honourable Clyde K. Wells, QC
- Vincent Withers, CM

== Territorial Honours ==
=== Order of Nunavut ===
Undress ribbon for a member of the Order of Nunavut

- Louie Kamookak
- Ellen Hamilton
- Red Pedersen

=== Order of the Northwest Territories ===
Undress ribbon for a member of the Order of Northwest Territories

- Nellie Cournoyea
- Jan Stirling
- Tony Whitford
- Marie Wilson

== Canadian Bravery Decorations ==
=== Star of Courage ===
Undress ribbon for the Star of Courage

- Lester Grant Lehmann
- Constable Curtis Keith Barrett
- Corporal Dany Daigle
- Constable Martin Fraser
- Constable Louis Létourneau
- Sergeant Richard Rozon
- Constable Samearn Son
- Kevin Michael Vickers

=== Medal of Bravery ===
Undress ribbon for the Medal of Bravery

- Sergeant Christopher Armstrong
- Cadet Master Seaman Kristianna Barton
- Keven Blanchette
- Rémy Bouchard
- Sergeant Sébastien Briand
- Constable Nicholas-Yan Charbonneau
- Brian Jason Cochrane
- Michel Côté
- Sergeant Claude Cuillerier
- Constable Pascal-Éric D'Amours
- Charles-Antoine Desautels
- Jonathan Desrochers
- Constable Simon Dufour
- Sergeant Steve Duguay
- Constable James Arthur Elvish, M.B. - This is a second award of the Medal of Bravery
- Constable Mathieu Fournier
- Paula Goosen
- Alain Gravel
- Mathieu Gravel
- Gerald Douglas Greenfield
- Constable Steve Guy
- Guy Hawk
- Michael Robert Henderson
- Constable Yannick Horion
- Constable Robert John Hunka
- Constable Ryan Todd Krupa
- Simon Lalonde
- André Larouche
- Sergeant Martin R. LeBlanc
- Bruce D. Leclair
- Constable Yves Leclerc
- Stephen Andrew Lee
- Richard Charles Louthood
- Janice Dianne Lovering
- Constable Andrea MacInnis
- Jason Darcy MacMillan
- Sergeant Jacques Marcheterre
- Constable Francis Marquis
- Dianne E. Matsalla
- Lorne R. Matsalla
- Eric Naud
- Anthony Norman
- Marc Overacker
- Terry James Palaschak
- Constable Dominic Pellerin
- Sergeant Pierre Pellerin
- Constable Jean-François Pépin
- Douglas James Petheram
- Constable Sophie Pilon
- Maurice Poirier
- Stéphane Poirier
- Constable Kristopher Poling
- François Pollak
- Constable Paul-André Rodrigue
- Sergeant Denis Roy
- Randolf Schwindt
- Michael Lloyd Serbinek
- Geraldine Shewchuk
- Phillip Shewchuk
- Gordon S. Smith
- Jordan Brice Smith
- Constable Konstantin Soukatchev
- Constable Myriam St-Onge
- Christian Vaillancourt
- Mario Guy Vaillancourt
- Stephen Vandervelden
- Detective-Sergeant Benoit Vigeant, M.O.M., C.D.
- Inspector Ronald Wheeldon
- Larry Whitty
- Sergeant Brent Douglas Young
- Safaa Baggar
- Constable Michelle Bergeron
- Lilianne Bessette
- Constable Christopher Bolland
- Myles Brown
- Corporal Gary Bubelis
- Constable Somoza Célestin
- Rorey Dee Chamberlain
- Jason Ronald Comeau
- David Del Rosario (posthumous)
- Mike P. K. Devine
- Domenic Dubreuil
- Mina Eglaycus
- Constable Mark Fiset
- Constable Jessie James Fontaine
- Constable Michael Dean Fox
- Lieutenant David Gauvin, C.D.
- Kristjan Gunderson
- Buddy Harwood
- Jesse Haw
- Michael Clayton Heide
- Audrey Gay Hicks
- Kevin Laverne Hiebert
- Justin Patrick Huska
- Constable Kevin Johnson
- Master Corporal Tyler W. Jordan
- Tyrone Josdal
- Randon Joseyounen
- Constable Michael Klarenbeek
- Annick Lajoie
- Constable Amyn Lakha
- Constable Jean-Pierre Lavigne
- Chelsea Little
- Corporal Michael Edward Loerke (retired)
- Michael Conulibang Lumahang (posthumous)
- Chad Lyttle
- Constable Maxim Malo
- Constable Sylvie Marcoux
- Tyrell Winston Neufeld
- Owen O'Connor
- Constable Michel Palmer
- Sylvain Christian Pedneault
- Brent Ian Penner
- James Blair Raoul
- Cindy Leigh Rogers
- Daniel Jordan Ross
- Daryl Roy
- Constable Patrick Ruest
- Sergeant Dwayne Rumbolt, C.D.
- Della Brynn Shore
- David F. R. Smith
- Ean Smith
- Eryn Patricia Smith
- Donald Alan St. Pierre
- Constable Carl Russell Stene
- Constable Charles Thom
- Gordon Paul Kenneth Tourand
- Constable Herbert Waye

== Meritorious Service Decorations ==
=== Second Award of the Meritorious Service Cross (Military Division) ===
Undress ribbon for a second award of the Meritious Service Cross in the military division

=== Meritorious Service Cross (Military Division) ===
Undress ribbon for Meritious Service Cross in the military division

- Colonel Daniel Stewart Constable, M.S.C., C.D.
- Commander Julian Andrew Elbourne, M.S.C., C.D.
- Admiral William E. Gortney, M.S.C. (United States Navy)
- Chief Petty Officer 1st Class Ian Mark Kelly, M.M.M., M.S.C., C.D.
- Colonel Eric Jean Kenny, M.S.C., M.S.M., C.D.
- Lieutenant-Colonel Dwayne Michael Lemon, M.S.C., C.D.
- Lieutenant-Commander Jeffrey Murray, M.S.C., C.D.
- Lieutenant-Colonel Gary O'Neil, M.S.C., C.D.
- Petty Officer 1st Class Micheal Andrew Penner, M.S.C., C.D.
- Colonel Lise Bourgon, M.S.C., C.D.
- Colonel Sean Thomas Boyle, O.M.M., M.S.C., M.S.M., C.D.
- Lieutenant-Colonel Jason Christopher Guiney, M.S.C., C.D.
- Major Robert Paul Joseph Tremblay, M.S.C., C.D.

=== Meritorious Service Cross (Civil Division) ===
Undress ribbon for Meritious Service Cross in the civilian division

- Jean-François Archambault
- Michael Burns
- Chief Superintendent Craig Callens
- Jacques CorcosPaul Dubé
- Andréanne Emard
- Leena Evic
- Robert Fowler
- Shaun Francis
- Mike Frastacky (posthumous)
- Sergeant Cris Gastaldo
- Colin Glassco, A.O.E.
- Superintendent Jim Gresham
- Jean-Claude Mahé
- Angéline Martel
- Corporal Ben Maure
- Staff Sergeant Alan McCambridge
- Chris Mowbray
- Mylène Paquette
- David Parsons, O.N.L.
- Inspector Trent Rolfe
- Joseph Rotman, O.C. (posthumous)
- James Stewart (posthumous)
- Morgan Wienberg
- Ray Zahab
- Tom Affleck, M.S.C.
- Carolyn Mitchell Hamilton Pennycook Cross, M.S.C.
- Philip J. Currie, A.O.E., M.S.C.
- Edwina Jarvis Eddy, M.S.C.
- Janeece Edroff, M.S.C.
- Dominick Gauthier, M.S.C.
- Thomas H. Greidanus, M.S.C.
- Jennifer Heil, M.S.C.
- Marcel Lauzière, M.S.C.
- Stephen Ward Leafloor, M.S.C.
- Janet Longmore, M.S.C.
- Staff Sergeant David Frederick McIntyre, M.O.M., M.S.C.
- Lindey Louise McIntyre, M.S.C.
- JD Miller, M.S.C.
- Parker Mitchell, M.S.C.
- Todd Stuart Nicholson, M.S.C.
- George Edward Greenspan Roter, M.S.C.
- Pernell-Karl (P. K.) Sylvester Subban, M.S.C.
- Hannah Taylor, M.S.C.
- Robert A. Walsh, M.S.C.
- Paul A. Young, M.S.C.

=== Third Award of the Meritorious Service Medal (Military Division) ===
Undress ribbon for the Meritious Service Medal in the military division

- Colonel Joseph Albert Paul Pierre St-Cyr, M.S.M., C.D.

=== Meritorious Service Medal (Military Division) ===
- Leading Seaman Andrew Christopher Astles, M.S.M.
- Colonel Bradley Scott Pearce Baker, M.S.M., C.D.
- Corporal Kyle Patrick Button, M.S.M.
- Lieutenant-Colonel Brendan Stirling Cook, M.S.M., C.D.
- Sergeant Shaun Edward Delamere, M.S.M., C.D.
- Lieutenant-Colonel Paul Joseph Doyle, M.S.M., C.D.
- Major Allan Ferriss, M.S.M., C.D.
- Honorary Colonel Louis Hugo Francescutti, M.S.M.
- Honorary Captain(N) Fred George, O.N.S., M.S.M.
- Captain Michael Gibbons, M.S.M.
- Lieutenant-Colonel Luc Joseph Girouard, O.M.M., M.S.M., C.D.
- Lieutenant-Colonel Ryan Edward Jurkowski, M.S.M., C.D.
- Leading Seaman Curtis Lee Korolyk, M.S.M.
- Colonel Mario Leblanc, M.S.M., C.D.
- Lieutenant-Colonel David Charles Moar, M.S.M., C.D.
- Lieutenant-Colonel Jonathan James Nelles, M.S.M., C.D.
- Lieutenant-Colonel Robert Michael Poisson, M.S.M., C.D.
- Petty Officer 1st Class Peter Ronald John Storie, M.S.M., C.D.
- Captain Aly Alibhai, M.S.M.
- Captain Charles Bailey, M.S.M., C.D.
- Captain Raphael MacKenzie, M.S.M.
- Lieutenant-Colonel David Pletz, M.S.M., C.D.
- Lieutenant-Colonel Francis William Radiff, M.S.M., C.D.
- Chief Warrant Officer John Garry Short, M.M.M., M.S.M., C.D.
- Lieutenant-Commander Brian Anthony Trager, M.S.M., C.D.

=== Second Award of the Meritorious Service Medal (Civil Division) ===
- Wyatt McWilliams, M.S.M.

=== Meritorious Service Medal (Civil Division) ===
Undress ribbon for Meritious Service Medal in the civilian division

- Sergeant Samuel Anderson
- Frank Baillie
- Marc Balevi
- Catherine Baylis
- Martin Bergmann (posthumous)
- Alexandre Bilodeau
- George Bittman (posthumous)
- Jessica Bowden
- Esther Bryan
- Lembi Buchanan
- Sydney Burrows
- Bonnie Buxton
- Hélène Campbell
- Jim Casey
- Frédéric Cassir
- Hubert Chrétien
- Tony Clark (posthumous)
- Dan Claypool
- Mark Cohon, O.Ont.
- Sergeant Alan Comeau
- Andy Cottrell
- Superintendent Stephen Covey
- Peter Cowan
- Geneviève Dechêne
- Elizabeth Elliott (posthumous)
- Mellisa Emblin
- Robert Fetherstonhaugh
- Allison Fisher, O.Ont.
- L. Jean Fournier, C.M., C.Q.
- Sergeant James Giczi
- Gordon Gore
- Erin Gravelle
- Sharon Hapton
- Ian Hinksman
- Joé Juneau
- Anthony Kelly
- Deborah Kerr
- Greg Lagacé
- Jenna Lambert
- Pierre Legault
- David Lemon
- Candice Lys
- Ken MacLeod
- Nancy MacNeill
- Deborah Maskens
- René Matthey (posthumous)
- Murray McCann
- David McGuire
- Brian McKeever
- Robin McKeever
- Kent Nagano
- Paul Nguyen
- Marie-Élaine Patenaude
- Sergeant Dave Patterson
- Luca Patuelli
- Benjamin Peterson
- Brian Philcox
- Owen Rees
- Véronique Rivest
- Louise Russo
- Michael Ruta
- Felix Saint-Denis
- Tom Sampson
- Byron Samson
- Susanne Saunders-Matthey (posthumous)
- John Seymour
- Alexandra Sicotte-Lévesque
- Michael Stevens
- Kim Sutherland
- Lloyd Swick
- Jowi Taylor
- Angelo Towndale
- Rebecca Veevee
- Grégoire Webber
- Lauren Woolstencroft
- Ruslana Wrzesnewskyj
- Paul York
- Berend Zonnenberg
- William Adair, M.S.M.
- Tammy Aristilde, M.S.M.
- Richard James Armstrong, M.S.M.
- Constable Alan Dennis Arsenault, M.S.M.
- Constable Kimberly Anne Ashford, M.B., M.S.M.
- John Michael Baigent, M.S.M.
- Robert Cullimore Blacker, M.S.M.
- Edward M. Brown, M.S.M.
- Michelle Bruce, M.S.M.
- Gavin Buchan, M.S.M.
- Michael Ryan Callan, M.S.M.
- Robert Wendell Clarke, M.S.M., C.D.
- Sandra Clarke, M.S.M.
- Patricia Margaret Crossley, M.S.M.
- Rodney Crossley, M.S.M.
- Ivan X. de Souza, M.S.M.
- Paul Douglas Dickson, M.S.M.
- Armand Calixte Doucet, M.S.M.
- Lee Durdon, M.S.M.
- Geoff Eaton, M.S.M.
- Leonard J. Edwards, M.S.M.
- Nicole Edwards, M.S.M.
- Angela Elster, M.S.M.
- Nicolino Frate, M.S.M.
- Philippe Gélinas, M.S.M.
- Lisa Glithero, M.S.M.
- Karen Kerr Goodyear, M.S.M.
- Corporal Darrel Vincent Gyorfi, M.S.M.
- Superintendent David William Hazelton, M.S.M.
- J. A. Heffernan, M.S.M.
- Fran Herman, M.S.M.
- Matthew Hill, M.S.M.
- Constable Tobin Hinton, M.O.M., M.S.M.
- Zabeen Hirji, M.S.M.
- Philip D. Hiscock, M.S.M.
- Robert Hollett, M.S.M.
- Lenny Hollingsworth, M.S.M.
- Carin Lee Holroyd, M.S.M.
- Jessie Lynn Jollymore, M.S.M.
- Robert Kirkpatrick, M.S.M.
- Joanne Klauke-Labelle, M.S.M. (posthumous)
- Constable David W. Kolb, M.S.M.
- Allan H. Kristofferson, M.S.M.
- Michel Robert Labbé, M.S.M.
- Howe Lee, M.S.M., C.D.
- Major James Gerard Lynch, M.S.M., C.D.
- Leo Kwan Yue Ma, M.S.M.
- Sergeant John Brian MacDonald, M.S.M.
- David James MacIntyre, M.S.M.
- Judy Maddren, M.S.M.
- Laurie Mallery, M.S.M.
- Barbara Ruth Marian, M.S.M.
- Roderick Allister McCulloch, M.S.M.
- Constable Walter Maxwell McKay, M.S.M.
- John Alexander McNee, M.S.M.
- Ranjana Mitra, M.S.M.
- Paige Alison Moorhouse, M.S.M.
- Wendy Morton, M.S.M.
- Constable William Ng, M.S.M.
- Harold J. Paddock, M.S.M.
- Michael Parkhill, O.Ont., M.S.M.
- Vincent Charles Pawis, O.Ont., M.S.M.
- Barry Phippen, M.S.M.
- Stephen E. Rapanos, M.S.M.
- Ron Rock, M.S.M.
- John Ferguson Ronald, M.S.M. (posthumous)
- Alexander George Salki, M.S.M.
- Vincent Matthew Savoia, M.S.M.
- Ellen Schwartz, M.S.M.
- Jeffrey Schwartz, M.S.M.
- Kenneth H. Setterington, M.S.M.
- Aaron Blake Seward, M.S.M.
- Doris Sommer-Rotenberg, M.S.M.
- Michael Stainton, M.S.M.
- Constable Mark Warren Steinkampf, M.S.M.
- Stephanie Tait, M.S.M.
- Jordin John Kudluk Tootoo, M.S.M.
- Julie Toskan-Casale, M.S.M.
- Stan Tu'Inukuafe, M.S.M.
- Theodore van der Zalm Jr., M.S.M.
- Maike van Niekerk, M.S.M.
- Gerald Walsh, M.S.M.
- Penny Walsh McGuire, M.S.M.
- Dale Weidman, M.S.M.
- Constable Rico Tze Leung Wong, M.S.M.
- Peter Manly Wright, M.S.M.
- Terry E. Yates, M.S.M.
- Ralph Barclay Young, M.S.M.
- Anne-Marie Zajdlik, O.Ont., M.S.M.
- Mark Allen Zamorski, M.S.M.

=== Secret appointments ===
- 4 June 2016: His Excellency the Right Honourable David Johnston, Governor General and Commander-in-Chief of Canada, on the recommendation of the Chief of the Defence Staff, has awarded a Meritorious Service Cross and four Meritorious Service Medals to members of the Canadian Armed Forces for military activities of high standard that have brought great honour to the Canadian Armed Forces and to Canada. For security and operational reasons, the recipient names and citations have not been released.
- 12 November 2016 : His Excellency the Right Honourable David Johnston, Governor General and Commander-in-Chief of Canada, on the recommendation of the Chief of the Defence Staff, has awarded a Meritorious Service Cross (Military Division) to a member of the Canadian Armed Forces for military activities of high standard that have brought great honour to the Canadian Armed Forces and to Canada. For security and operational reasons, the recipient's name and citation have not been released.

== Polar Medal ==
Undress ribbon of the Polar Medal

- Elisapi Aningmiuq
- Petty Officer 1st Class Yves Bernard
- David Hik
- Marilyn Jensen
- Robie Macdonald
- Lieutenant Cecil Francis May, C.D.
- Donat Savoie
- Peter Suedfeld
- Warwick Vincent

== Commonwealth and Foreign Orders, Decorations and Medal awarded to Canadians ==
=== From Her Majesty The Queen in Right of the United Kingdom ===
==== Member of the Most Excellent Order of the British Empire ====
Undress ribbon for all grades of the Most Excellent Order of the British Empire within the civil division

- Mr. David Barlow Buik
- Lieutenant-Colonel Gary P. O'Neil

==== Ebola Medal for Service in West Africa ====
Undress ribbon for the Ebola Medal for Service in West Africa

- Lieutenant(N) Ashley Sarah Atkins
- Corporal David Matthew Balun
- Corporal Michael Allen Barrett
- Corporal Michael J. Bedard
- Master Corporal Nanette Jean Black
- Sergeant Ashley Laurel Black
- Lieutenant(N) Anne Bolduc
- Captain Angela J. Bremner
- Lieutenant Janice Madeline Campbell
- Lieutenant Olivia Ann Carbonneau
- Captain Adrian Conway Carpenter
- Captain Guillaume Charbonneau
- Lieutenant-Colonel Paul Bryan Charlebois
- Lieutenant Sara L. Crabtree
- Sergeant James Edward Craig
- Master Corporal Amanda Marie Crawford
- Captain Jillian E. Cross
- Sergeant Kristopher Stephen Daum
- Sub-Lieutenant Nova T. Dowling
- Captain Samantha A. Drew
- Sub-Lieutenant Susanne M. Erickson
- Lieutenant-Commander Melanie Renee Espina
- Master Warrant Officer Philip Michael Fewer
- Lieutenant-Colonel Colleen Ann Forestier
- Master Warrant Officer John Darren Gallant
- Captain Amy K. Godwin
- Captain Kim Patricia Grimard
- Corporal Donald William Mark Handford
- Corporal Jocelyn L. Hanna
- Corporal Ashley Rebekah Beatrice Harrison
- Master Corporal Vanessa J. Jacobs
- Captain(N) Raymond Liang-chiyu
- Corporal Ryan J. Kristy
- Lieutenant Jessica M. Kuipers
- Major Jennifer Rosa Lawton
- Sergeant Christina Lee Marie Litschel
- Corporal Jillian M. MacDonald
- Sub-Lieutenant Carly J. MacKay
- Lieutenant-Commander Harold D. S. MacLean
- Major Trisha L. MacLeod
- Master Corporal R. N. Jean-François Mahé
- Major Dennis Alain Marion
- Lieutenant(N) Shelly L. Maynard
- Captain Bradley J. McCallum
- Master Corporal John J. McGinn
- Corporal Blair J. McIntyre
- Lieutenant Michelle T. Mills
- Corporal Peter Alexander Milne
- Corporal Michael S. L. Monardo
- Captain Carly Lynn Montpellier
- Lieutenant Tamara D. A. Nevills
- Lieutenant-Commander Leigh H. Nickerson
- Lieutenant-Colonel Gary P. O'Neil
- Master Corporal Janet Laura Osterbeck
- Master Corporal J. F. Jean-Sébastien Pellan
- Lieutenant(N) Timothy J. L. Peppin
- Leading Seaman Allan Michael Philpott
- Lieutenant(N) Jeffery Praught
- Captain Zundel Estodo Quintin
- Captain Harold Rivera
- Lieutenant(N) Cindy M. Rochette
- Corporal Charles Paul John Earle Roper
- Corporal Jonathan A. Santos
- Sergeant Jeffrey J. Scott
- Major Andrea K. Seaby
- Corporal Aidan Shea
- Corporal Jennifer A. Southwell
- Master Seaman Nicole M. Spivey
- Corporal John R. Tait
- Corporal Sigrid S. Tremblay
- Captain Chad L. Turnbull
- Corporal Patrick R. Vanneste
- Sub-Lieutenant Jaime A. Vickers
- Corporal Scot A. Walker
- Warrant Officer John Roy Woodworth
- Captain Terry Andrew Wynn

=== From the Government of the Republic of Austria ===
==== Gold Medal for Services to the Republic of Austria ====
- Mrs. Ernestine Tadehl

=== From the President of the Republic of Finland ===
Undress ribbon for a Knight of the Order of the Lion of Finland

==== Knight of the Order of the Lion of Finland ====
- Mr. Brian Vilho Koivu
- Mr. Niilo Kustaa Saari

=== From the President of the French Republic ===
Undress ribbon for a Commander of the National Order of the Legion of Honour

==== Commander of the National Order of the Legion of Honour ====
- General Thomas J. Lawson, C.M.M., C.D. (Retired)
- The Right Honourable Brian Mulroney, P.C., C.C., G.O.Q.

==== Officer of the National Order of the Legion of Honour ====
- Mr. Robert Pichette
- Lieutenant-General Marquis Hainse
- Mr. Gil Rémillard

==== Knight of the National Order of the Legion of Honour ====
- Mr. Alban d'Amours
- Mr. Robert Panet-Raymond

==== Officer of the National Order of Merit ====
Undress ribbon for an Officer of the National Order of Merit

- Lieutenant-General Stuart Beare

==== National Medal of Recognition for victims of terrorism ====
Undress ribbon for the National Medal of Recognition for victims of terrorism

==== Officer of the Order of Arts and Letters ====
Undress ribbon for an Officer of the Order of Arts and Letters

==== Knight of the Order of the Academic Palms ====
- Mr. Serge Guimond
- Mr. Michel de Waele
- Ms. Lucie Lequin

==== Knight of the Order of Agricultural Merit ====
- Mr. Martin Gosselin

==== National Defence Medal, Bronze Echelon ====
- Colonel Guy Savard

=== From the President of the Republic of Italy ===
==== Commander of the Order of the Star of Italy ====
- Mr. Palmacchio Di Iulio

=== From the President of the Republic of Haiti ===
==== Grand Cross of the National Order of Honour and Merit, Silver Plaque ====
Undress ribbon for a Grand Cross of the National Order of Honour and Merit

- The Honourable Mauril Adrien Jules Bélanger, P.C.

=== From the President of Hungary ===
==== Commander's Cross with Star of the Order of Merit of the Republic of Hungary (Civil Division) ====
Undress ribbon for a Commander's Cross with Star of the Order of Merit of the Republic of Hungary

- Mr. Peter Munk

==== Officer's Cross of the Order of Merit of Hungary (Civil Division) ====
- Mr. Tibor Abraham

==== Knight's Cross of the Order of Merit of Hungary (Civil Division) ====
- M. John Barakso
- Ms. Linda Hasenfratz
- Mr. Andrew Saxton
- Mr. Gyula Szentmihaly

==== Gold Cross of Merit of the Republic of Hungary (Civil Division) ====
- Ms. Olga Borbely

==== Silver Cross of Merit of the Republic of Hungary (Civil Division) ====
- Ms. Tunde Torok
- Ms. Eva Masszi Tomory

=== From the President of Lithuania ===
==== Order of Merit of Lithuania ====
- Mr. Ginutis Procuta

=== From the His Royal Highness The Grand Duke of Luxembourg ===
==== Officer of the Order of Merit of Luxembourg ====
- Mr. Robert Allan Philipps

==== Knight of the Order of the Oak Crown ====
- Mr. Ron Bozzer

=== From His Majesty The Emperor of Japan ===
==== Order of the Rising Sun, Gold and Silver Star ====
- Mr. Leonard John Edwards

==== Order of the Rising Sun, Gold Rays with Neck Ribbon ====
- Mr. Victor Leyland Young

==== Order of the Rising Sun, Gold Rays with Rosette ====
- Dr. X. Jie Yang

==== Order of the Rising Sun, Gold and Silver Rays ====
- Mr. Robert Tadashi Banno

=== From the President of Mexico ===
==== Order of the Aztec Eagle, Insignia Grade ====
- Mr. James Erwin Downey
- Mr. Colin Robertson

=== From His Majesty The King of the Netherlands ===
==== Commemorative Medal for Peace Operations with ATFME Clasp ====
- Captain Brian J. Coyle

==== Medal for Peace Operations, Second Clasp ====
- Captain Brian J. Coyle

=== From the President of the Republic of Poland ===
==== Knight's Cross of the Order of Polonia Restituta ====
Undress ribbon for a Knight's Cross of the Order of Polonia Restituta

- Mr. Jan Zaklikowski
- Mr. Stanislaw Adam
- Ms. Albina Polatynska

==== Officer's Cross of the Order of Merit of the Republic of Poland ====
to Mr. Andrzej Kawka

==== Knight's Cross of the Order of Merit of the Republic of Poland ====
Undress ribbon for a Knight's Cross (5th class) of the Order of Merit of the Republic of Poland

- Mr. Fernand de Varennes
- Mr. Lech Galezowski
- Mr. Stanislaw Majerski
- Mr. Henryk Miszczak

==== Cross of Freedom and Solidarity ====
Cross of Freedom and Solidaritya

- Mr. Ryszard Fryga
- Mr. Jan Zaklikowski

==== Gold Cross of Merit ====
Undress ribbon for the Gold Cross of Merit

- Ms. Renata Sieranska

==== Silver Cross of Merit ====
Undress ribbon for the Silver Cross of Merit

- Mr. Antony Kozlowski

==== Silver Medal for Long Service ====
Undress ribbon for the silver medal for Long Service

==== Siberian Exiles Cross ====
- Mr. Stanislaw Zylka

==== Long Marital Life Medal ====
Undress ribbon of the Medal for Long Marital Life

=== From the Government of Portugal ===
==== Commander of the Order of Merit of Portugal ====
- Mr. Louis F. de Melo

=== From the President of Romania ===
==== Officer of the National Order of Merit (Civil Division) ====
- Mr. Corneliu Chisu

=== From His Majesty The King of Spain ===
==== Officer of the Order of Civil Merit ====
- Mr. Austin Cooke

=== From the President of the United States of America ===
==== Officer of the Legion of Merit ====
Undress ribbon of an Officer of the Legion of Merit of the United States

- Captain(N) Richard P. Gravel
- Brigadier-General Dean J. Milner
- Colonel David A. Rundle
- Brigadier-General Carl J. Turenne
- Brigadier-General Joseph Jean René Guy Hamel
- Brigadier-General Paul Rutherford
- Lieutenant-General Marquis Hainse
- Brigadier-General Derek A. Macaulay

==== Legionnaire of the Legion of Merit ====
Undress ribbon of a Legionnaire of the Legion of Merit of the United States

- Colonel Mark Misener

==== Bronze Star Medal ====
Undress ribbon for Bronze Star Medal of the United States of America

- Colonel Mark Misener

==== Defence Meritorious Service Medal ====
Undress ribbon of the Defence Meritorious Service Medal of the United States

- Major Kelly Chow
- Major Jacqueline M. Cowley
- Lieutenant-Colonel Craig M. Flood
- Petty Officer 1st Class Scott O. Peddle
- Major Sherry A. Macleod
- Commander Brian D. Murray
- Lieutenant-Colonel David E. MacGillivary
- Colonel Darren E. Turner
- Major Kendra A. Hartery
- Lieutenant-Colonel Douglas M. Kromrey

==== Meritorious Service Medal ====
Undress ribbon of the Meritorious Service Medal of the United States

- Lieutenant-Colonel Byron Conway
- Major Michael Fawcett
- Major Lance Hoffe
- Major Joshua Riley
- Major Mathieu Gauthier
- Major Edith Miller
- Major Gerhard Hildebrandt
- Master Warrant Officer Giorgio N. Frausin
- Colonel Jacques J. Morneau
- Colonel Paul E. Ormsby
- Lieutenant-Colonel Sean J. Duggan
- Colonel J. P. Yvan Boilard
- Lieutenant-Colonel Steve Chouinard
- Lieutenant-Colonel Brian Erickson
- Major Andriy W. Szkwarek
- Major Nicholas Williams

==== Air Medal ====
Undress ribbon of the United States Air Medal

- Captain Gabriel J. Hanselpacker

=== From the President of the Republic of Zambia ===
==== Order of Distinguished Service (First Division) ====
- Mr. Colin B. Glassco

== Erratums of Commonwealth and Foreign Orders, Decorations and Medal awarded to Canadians ==
=== Corrected on 02 July 2016 ===
- From the President of the United States of America, Meritorious Service Medal, First Oak Leaf Cluster to Lieutenant-Colonel Sean J. Duggan.

=== Corrected on 27 August 2016 ===
- From the Government of the United States of America, the Meritorious Service Medal, First Oak Leaf Cluster to Colonel J. P. Yvan Boilard
