= Estabrook =

Estabrook is a surname. Notable people with the surname include:

== Real people ==
- Anne Evans Estabrook, American politician
- Charles E. Estabrook (1847–1918), American politician
- Christine Estabrook, American actress
- Dan Estabrook (born 1969), American photographer
- Experience Estabrook (1813–1894), American lawyer and legal administrator
- G. Estabrook (1845–1897), pen name used by American composer and singer Caroline Augusta Clowry
- Helen Estabrook, American film producer
- Howard Estabrook (1884–1978), American actor, film director, producer and screenwriter
- Iris Estabrook (born 1950), American politician
- James Estabrook (1796–1874), American sheriff
- Joseph W. Estabrook (1944–2012), American Roman Catholic bishop
- Mike Estabrook (disambiguation), multiple people
- Prince Estabrook, American slave

== Fictional characters ==
- Fay Estabrook, a character from the 1949 novel The Moving Target and its 1966 film adaptation Harper

== See also ==
- Estabrooks
