= World Press Cartoon =

World Press Cartoon is an independent organization based in Lisbon, Portugal. Founded in 2005 the organization is known for holding one of the world's largest and most prestigious annual press cartoon contests. World Press Cartoon has also organized separate exhibitions under thematic criteria, as gender violence or environment protection. In 2022 World Press Cartoon had its 17th edition.

From 2005 to 2014 the awards ceremony was held in Sintra. In 2015 in Cascais and from 2017 to 2022 in Caldas da Rainha. A new venue is expected to be announced early in 2025.

After the contest, the prizewinning cartoons are assembled into a traveling exhibition that was already presented in Spain, France, Belgium, Mozambique, Brazil, Serbia, Croatia, Slovenia, Bulgaria, Romania, Mexico, United Kingdom, Namibia, China and India. A catalogue presenting all the prizewinning entries is published annually in English and Portuguese.

Another primary objective of the organization is to support professional cartoonists on a wide international scale, with a special focus in the freedom of the press.

== 2022 winners ==
=== Editorial Cartoon ===
- 1st - Terror, Colombia
- 2nd - Boligán, México

=== Gag Cartoon ===
- 1st - T.V., Cuba
- 2nd - Victor Solis @visoor El World Press Cartoon premia una viñeta ambiental del mexicano Victor Solís (@Visoor) en EFEverde, México, publicado en EFEverde.com
- 2nd - Hontouris, Grecia

=== Caricature ===
- 1st - [Matias], Argentina
- 2nd - Frank Hoppmann, Alemania
- 3rd - J. Aldeguer, España

== 2018 winners ==
=== Caricature ===
- 1st - Luc Descheemaeker, Belgium
- 2nd - Peter Nieuwendijk, Netherlands
- 3rd - Thomas Antony, India

Honourable mentions

- Ali Husain Al Sumaikh, Bahrain
- Cau Gomez, Brazil
- Mário Alberto, Brazil
- Vasco Gargalo, Portugal
- Pedro J. Molina, Nicaragua

=== Gag Cartoon ===
- 1st - Nedeljko Ubovic, Serbia
- 2nd - Silvano Mello, Brazil
- 3rd - Fadi Abou Hassan, Norway

Honourable mentions

- Osmani Simanca, Brazil
- Angel Boligán, Mexico
- Mojmir Mihatov, Croatia

=== Editorial Cartoon ===
- 1st - Marilena Nardi, Italy
- 2nd - Cau Gomez, Brazil
- 3rd - Hicabi Demirc Turkey

Honourable mentions

- Ali Husain Al Sumaikh, Bahrain
- Yaser Alahmad, Turkey
- Agim Sulaj, Albania
- Norio Yamanoi, Cuba
- Shahram Rezaei Iran

=== Grand Prix World Press Cartoon 2018 ===
- Marilena Nardi, Italy

== 2017 winners ==
=== Caricature ===
- 1st - Luiz Carlos Fernandes, Brazil, Diário do Grande ABC
- 2nd - Eduardo Baptistão, Brazil, Veja
- 3rd - Mariagrazia Quaranta, Italy, L’Unità

Honourable mentions

- Agustín Sciamarella, Italy, El Pais
- Shankar Pamarthy, India, Sakshi Daily
- Cau Gomez, Brazil, A Tarde

=== Gag Cartoon ===
- 1st - Toshow Borkovic, Serbia, Ilustrovarna Politika
- 2nd - Silvan Wegmann, Switzerland, Schweiz am Sonntag
- 3rd - Xavier Bonilla, Ecuador, Nuestro Mundo

Honourable mentions

- Rousso, France, Zelim
- Trayko Popov, Bulgaria, Cartoon Art
- Silvano Mello, Brazil, O Trem Itabirano

=== Editorial Cartoon ===
- 1st - Alireza Pakdel, Iran, Etemad
- 2nd -Michael Kountouris, Greece, Efimerida Ton Syntakton
- 3rd - Constantin Sunnerberg France, Courrier International

Honourable mentions

- Eric van der Wal, Netherlands De Telegraaf
- Nahid Zamani, Iran Esfahanenimrooz
- Marco de Angelis, Italy, Buduar
- António Jorge Gonçalves, India, Gulf News

=== Grand Prix World Press Cartoon 2017 ===
- Alireza Pakdel, Iran, Etemad

== 2015 winners ==
=== Caricature ===
- 1st - Cau Gomez, Brazil, A Tarde
- 2nd - Dalcio Machado, Brazil, Correio Popular
- 3rd - Riber Hansson, Sweden, Courrier International

Honourable mentions

- Santiagu, Portugal, Em Contexto
- Yaser Khanbaray, Iran, Zhyar Magazin
- Ilian Savkov, Bulgaria, Standart
- Bruce MacKinnon, Canada, The Chronicle Herald

=== Gag Cartoon ===
- 1st - Michael Kountouris, Greece, Shedia
- 2nd - Angel Boligán, Mexico, Conozca
- 3rd - Mohammad Ali Khalaji, Iran, Jam-e-Jam

Honourable mentions

- Cost, France, Courrier International
- Trayko Popov, Bulgaria, Duma
- Marilena Nardi, Italia, Barricate
- Vladimir Stankovsky, Serbia, Vreme

=== Editorial Cartoon ===
- 1st - André Carrilho, Portugal, Diário de Notícias
- 2nd - Nikolov Tchavdar, Bulgaria, Pressa Daily
- 3rd - Cost, France, Kpaiha

Honourable mentions

- Michael Kountouris, Greece, Efimerida Ton Syntakton
- William Rasoanaivo, Madagascar, L'Éxpress
- Burkh Fritsche, Germany, Die Tageszeitung
- Angel Boligán, Mexico, El Universal
- Ramachandra Babu, India, Gulf News
- Cau Gomez, Brasil. A Tarde
- Contraste, Cristina Sampaio, Portugal, Africa 21

=== Grand Prix World Press Cartoon 2015 ===
- André Carrilho, Portugal, Diário de Notícias
