= Estabrooks =

Estabrooks is a surname. Notable people with the surname include:

- Bill Estabrooks (born 1947), Canadian educator and politician
- Carole A. Estabrooks (born 1954), Canadian applied health services researcher
- Frederick L. Estabrooks (1876–1974), Canadian politician
- George Estabrooks (1895–1973), Canadian-American psychologist
- Jonathan Estabrooks (born 1983), Canadian opera singer

== See also ==
- Estabrook
