= Bruce MacKinnon =

Canadian editorial cartoonist

Bruce MacKinnon CM ONS
- Born: 1961 (59–60); Antigonish, Nova Scotia, Canada
- Occupation: Editorial cartoonist

Bruce MacKinnon CM ONS (born 1961) is a Canadian editorial cartoonist for The Chronicle Herald in Halifax, Nova Scotia. He is the recipient of several awards of excellence for his work.

== Biography ==
MacKinnon was born in Antigonish, Nova Scotia, where he attended high school and later studied arts at St. Francis Xavier University. As a youth he also lived with his family in Kingston, Ontario, and Truro and Halifax, Nova Scotia. He studied Fine Arts at Mount Allison University and graphic design at the Nova Scotia College of Art and Design. He had not graduated from NSCAD before he began cartooning full-time.

His first paid work as a cartoonist came at the age of 14, when he began drawing a weekly cartoon for The Casket in Antigonish. In high school and university in Antigonish, he drew cartoons for the Antigonish Spectator and the Xaverian Weekly, respectively.

In 1985, MacKinnon began drawing weekly cartoons for The Chronicle Herald in Halifax, and was hired full-time in 1986, filling a gap on the paper's editorial page that had been present ever since the retirement of its long-time cartoonist Bob Chambers in 1976. With the redesign of the Herald's weekend edition in April 2013, his hand-drawn font was used for all the headlines in the "Opinion" section.

Since becoming the paper's regular cartoonist, MacKinnon has achieved status as one of Canada's finest editorial cartoonists, called by the Canadian Encyclopedia, "among the new breed of distinguished artists" in Canadian editorial cartooning. To date he has won 18 Atlantic Journalism Awards for editorial cartooning, and eight National Newspaper Awards (1992, 1993, 2013, 2014, 2015, 2017, 2022, 2023), including the NNA inaugural Journalist of the Year award for 2014. He came in second in the World Press Cartoon competition in 2004. In 2014 he won the World Press Freedom Award and received their Honourable Mention in 2015. He also won second prize in the 2014 Niels Bugge Cartoon Award. Both a popular and at times controversial cartoonist, he was named Best Political Cartoonist in Halifax for several years running by The Coast newspaper before it elevated him to their Hall of Fame, thus retiring him from further contest.

MacKinnon participated in a panel discussion on political cartooning in Canada at the screening of Cartoonists: Foot Soldiers of Democracy held on 27 March 2015, at the Reel Artists Film Festival. He appeared as a Guest Speaker at Eurocature '15 in June 2015 in Vienna, Austria.

Much of MacKinnon's work forms part of the permanent collections of StFX University, the National Gallery of Canada and the Art Gallery of Nova Scotia. In 1996 he was granted an honorary doctorate by St. Mary's University for his work and in 2011 he was made a member of the Order of Nova Scotia (ONS). In 2013 he received both an honorary doctorate of fine arts from NSCAD university and the Friend of StFX Award from St. Francis Xavier University. In the 2016 Canadian honours, he was appointed Member of the Order of Canada (CM) "for his contributions as one of Canada’s most skilled, empathetic and provocative editorial cartoonists."

Some of MacKinnon's images have received wider attention, sometimes beyond Canada's borders. In 2014, after a reservist on ceremonial sentry duty at the nation's National War Memorial was killed by a shooter who then broke into the parliament building and had a gun battle with security, MacKinnon depicted the bronze World War I soldiers of the memorial extending their hands to the murdered man. In response to the 2017 Las Vegas shooting, MacKinnon drew a cartoon depicting Uncle Sam using his body to shield a spokesman for the National Rifle Association of America and reassuringly saying, "Everything's okay... you're safe..." while they are surrounded by the sprawled, bloody corpses of the shooting victims. That cartoon was widely shared in 2017, and again in 2018 following other gun attacks. After the Parkland High School shooting, the cartoon was shared over 600,000 times on Facebook and was retweeted over a million times by Twitter users, including Mark Hamill, Steven Van Zandt and Ron Perlman.

In 2018, during the confirmation hearings for U.S. Supreme Court nominee Brett Kavanaugh that included a contentious sexual assault investigation, MacKinnon drew a cartoon showing Lady Justice being violently pinned to the floor and having her mouth covered by the hands of Republican men, mimicking the account of Christine Blasey Ford. The image was profusely shared, and also appeared on protest signs.

== Personal life ==
MacKinnon is married and has two children.

== Publications ==
- Inklings: Cartoons and caricatures. Halifax, NS: Nimbus Publishing. 1990. ISBN 978-0-921054-53-5.
- Inklings II: Cartoons and caricatures. Halifax, NS: Nimbus Publishing. 1994. ISBN 978-1-55109-094-8.
- Pendemonium: Cartoons and caricatures. Halifax, NS: Nimbus Publishing. 2002. ISBN 978-1-55109-415-1.
- Penetration: The 25th Anniversary Collection. Foreword by Peter Mansbridge. 2010. ISBN 978-1-55109-779-4.0
- Drawing Opinions: MacKinnon, DeAdder & More: Cartoons and the Stories that Inspire Them, Chronicle Herald, 2013

== Exhibitions ==
- Drawn to the Summit: A G-20 Exhibition of International Political Cartoons, 2009
- Exhibition: Editorial Cartoons, Bruce MacKinnon, 2010
- eurocature 2015, 2015
