= Sue Johnson =

British clinical psychologist (1947–2024)

Sue Johnson CM
- Born: 19 December 1947; Chatham, Kent, England
- Died: 23 April 2024 (aged 76); Victoria, British Columbia, Canada

Academic background
- Education: University of British Columbia

Academic work
- Main interests: Bonding, attachment, romantic relationships
- Notable ideas: Emotionally focused therapy

Susan Johnson CM (19 December 1947 – 23 April 2024) was a British clinical psychologist, couples therapist and author who lived and worked in Canada. She is known for her work in the field of psychology on human bonding, attachment theory and romantic relationships.

== Life and career ==
Johnson earned a B.A. in English Literature from the University of Hull in 1968, and an Ed.D. in Counselling Psychology from the University of British Columbia in 1984. At the time of her death, she was a Distinguished Research Professor at Alliant International University, a professor of Clinical Psychiatry at the University of British Columbia, and held the title of Emeritus Professor in the Department of Psychology at the University of Ottawa. With Les Greenberg, she developed emotionally focused (couples and family) therapy (EFT), a psychotherapeutic approach for couples based on attachment theory. She founded the International Centre for Excellence in Emotionally Focused Therapy, which offers training in EFT to mental health professionals.

Johnson authored several books for therapists (including EFT treatment manuals) and general audiences.

In 2016, Johnson was named Family Psychologist of the Year by the American Psychological Association's Society for Couple and Family Psychology. In the 2016 Canadian honours, she was appointed a Member of the Order of Canada (CM).

Johnson died from cancer in Victoria, British Columbia, on 23 April 2024, at the age of 76.

== Selected works ==
=== Books ===
- Johnson, S.M. (2019) Attachment Theory in Practice: Emotionally Focused Therapy (EFT) With Individuals, Couples, and Families. New York: Guilford Press
- Johnson, S.M.; Sanderfer, K. (2016) Created for Connection: The "Hold Me Tight" Guide for Christian Couples. New York: Little Brown
- Johnson, S.M. (2013) Love Sense: The Revolutionary Science of Romantic Relationships. New York: Little Brown
- Johnson, S.M. (2008) Hold Me Tight: Seven Conversations for a Lifetime of Love. New York: Little Brown
- Johnson, S.M. (2007). Practica de la Terapia Matrimonial Concentrada Emocionalmente: Creando Conexiones New York: Routledge, Taylor & Francis Group – Spanish Edition.
- Johnson, S.M., Bradley, B., Furrow, J., Lee, A., Palmer, G., Tilley, D. & Woolley, S.(2005) Becoming an Emotionally Focused Therapist: The Workbook. New York: Brunner /Routledge.
- Johnson, S.M. (2002) Emotionally Focused Couple Therapy with Trauma Survivors: Strengthening Attachment Bonds. New York: Guilford Press.
- Johnson, S.M. (1996) (2004 -2nd edition). Creating Connection: The Practice of Emotionally Focused Marital Therapy. New York: Brunner/Mazel (now Brunner /Routledge).
- Saxe, B. J., Johnson, S.M. et al. (1994) From victim to survivor: A group treatment model for women survivors of incest. Government of Canada: Health Department. Distributed across Canada in French and English, pp. 1–188.
- Greenberg, L. & Johnson, S.M. (1988) Emotionally Focused Therapy for Couples. New York: Guilford Press.

=== Articles ===
- Johnson, S. (2019). Attachment in action—changing the face of 21st century couple therapy. Current opinion in psychology, 25, 101–104. https://doi.org/10.1016/j.copsyc.2018.03.007
- Lebow, J. L., Chambers, A. L., Christensen, A., & Johnson, S. M. (2012). Research on the treatment of couple distress. Journal of Marital and Family therapy, 38(1), 145–168. https://doi.org/10.1111/j.1752-0606.2011.00249.x
- Johnson, S.M. (2008). "My, How Couples Therapy Has Changed!: Attachment, Love and Science."
- Makinen, J. A., & Johnson, S. M. (2006). Resolving attachment injuries in couples using emotionally focused therapy: steps toward forgiveness and reconciliation. Journal of consulting and clinical psychology, 74(6), 1055–1064. https://doi.org/10.1037/0022-006X.74.6.1055
- Johnson, S. M., Hunsley, J., Greenberg, L., & Schindler, D. (1999). Emotionally focused couples therapy: Status and challenges. Clinical psychology: Science and practice, 6(1), https://doi.org/67.10.1093/clipsy/6.1.67
