= Mary Anne White =

Canadian materials scientist

Mary Anne White OC FRSC
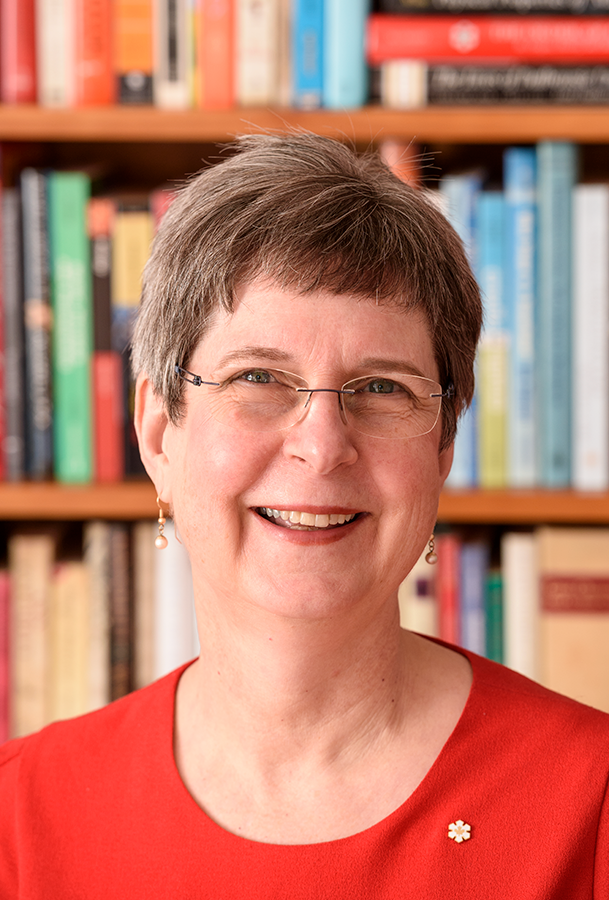
- Mary Anne White, Canadian scientist
- Born: 28 December 1953; London
- Alma mater: McMaster University; University of Western Ontario
- Spouse(s): Robert L. White
- Awards: Officer of the Order of Canada; Fellow of the Royal Society of Canada (2016)
- Academic career
- Institutions: University of Oxford; University of Waterloo; Dalhousie University (1983–); University of Waterloo Faculty of Science (1981–1983)

Mary Anne White OC FRSC (born December 28, 1953) is a Canadian materials scientist who is the Harry Shirreff (Emerita) Professor of Chemical Research at Dalhousie University. Her research considers novel solar thermal materials and their application in renewable energy devices. She is the author of a textbook titled Physical Properties of Materials. She was appointed an Officer to the Order of Canada in 2016.

== Early life and education ==
White was born in London, Ontario. As a child, she was encouraged to complete science experiments. She attended the University of Western Ontario for undergraduate studies in chemistry. Returning in 2011 to deliver the convocation address, White explained, “By the end of the first week at Western, I knew that I had found my place in life… I had met ‘my people’ and being back at Western always brings back that excitement,”. She was a research student at McMaster University, where she worked under the supervision of James A. Morrison. She was a postdoctoral fellow at the University of Oxford and the University of Waterloo.

== Research and career ==
White began her academic career as an assistant professor at the University of Waterloo. In 1983 joined Dalhousie University, where she served as both Professor of Chemistry and Physics and Director of the Institute for Research in Materials. White developed novel thermal energy storage materials, specialising in areas such as materials that serve as efficient thermoelectrics and thermochromics, with low thermal expansion and the ability of phase-change materials to store heat. In 2010, White founded the Dalhousie Research in Energy, Advanced Materials and Sustainability (DREAMS) program. She was made Harry Shirreff Professor of Chemical Research Emerita in 2016.

White appeared on the CBC Radio show Maritime Noon, answering listener science questions.

== Awards and honours ==
- 1993 Dalhousie University Faculty of Science Award for Excellence in Teaching
- 1994 Calorimetry Conference Sunner Memorial Award
- 1995 Elected Fellow, Chemical Institute of Canada
- 1996 Chemical Institute of Canada Noranda Award
- 2002 Elected as Fellow of the International Union of Pure and Applied Chemistry
- 2002 Chemical Institute of Canada for Chemical Education Union Carbide Award
- 2003 Inducted in Discovery Centre Hall of Fame
- 2004 APICS/Canpolar Science Communication Award
- 2007 Royal Society of Canada McNeil Medal
- 2008 McMaster University University Honorary Doctorate
- 2011 University of Western Ontario Honorary Doctorate
- 2012 American Chemical Society Award for Incorporation of Sustainability into Chemical Education
- 2012 University of Alberta D.B. Robinson Distinguished Speaker
- 2013 Elected as Fellow of the Royal Society of Canada
- 2016 Appointed as Officer Order of Canada
- 2017 University of Ottawa Honorary Doctorate
- 2020 Chemical Institute of Canada Canadian Light Source T K Sham Award for Materials Chemistry

== Selected publications ==
=== Book ===
- White, Mary Anne (2019), Physical properties of materials (3rd ed.), CRC Press, ISBN 9781138569171

=== Articles ===
- Bi-Zeng Zhan; Mary Anne White; Tsun-Kong Sham; James A Pincock; René J Doucet; K V Ramana Rao; Katherine N Robertson; T Stanley Cameron (1 February 2003). "Zeolite-confined Nano-RuO(2): A green, selective, and efficient catalyst for aerobic alcohol oxidation". Journal of the American Chemical Society. 125 (8): 2195–2199. doi:10.1021/JA0282691. ISSN 0002-7863. PMID 12590547. Wikidata Q44318425.
- Knop, Osvald; Wasylishen, Roderick E.; White, Mary Anne; Cameron, T. Stanley; Oort, Michiel J. M. Van (1 March 1990). "Alkylammonium lead halides. Part 2. CH3NH3PbX3 (X = Cl, Br, I) perovskites: cuboctahedral halide cages with isotropic cation reorientation". Canadian Journal of Chemistry. 68 (3): 412–422. doi:10.1139/V90-063. ISSN 0008-4042. Wikidata Q104887725.
- Tse, John S.; White, Mary Anne (August 1988). "Origin of glassy crystalline behavior in the thermal properties of clathrate hydrates: a thermal conductivity study of tetrahydrofuran hydrate". The journal of physical chemistry. 92 (17): 5006–5011. doi:10.1021/J100328A036. ISSN 0092-7325. Wikidata Q104967526.
- Zhan, Bi-Zeng; White, Mary Anne; Lumsden, Michael; Mueller-Neuhaus, Jason; Robertson, Katherine N.; Cameron, T. Stanley; Gharghouri, Michael (September 2002). "Control of Particle Size and Surface Properties of Crystals of NaX Zeolite". Chemistry of Materials. 14 (9): 3636–3642. doi:10.1021/CM011635F. ISSN 0897-4756. Wikidata Q104889822.

== Personal life ==
White is married to Robert L. White, a biological chemist at Dalhousie University, with whom she has two children.
