= Helen Fogwill Porter =

Canadian writer, educator, and activist (1930–2023)

Helen Fogwill Porter CM
- Born: May 8, 1930; St. John's, Newfoundland and Labrador, Canada
- Died: February 16, 2023 (aged 92); St. John's, Newfoundland and Labrador, Canada
- Known for: Writing, Volunteering, NDP Leader
- Political party: NDP
- Spouse: John Porter

Agnes Helen Fogwill Porter CM (May 8, 1930 – February 16, 2023) was a Canadian writer, educator, and activist.

== Early life ==
Porter was born on May 8, 1930, on the Southside of St. John's, Newfoundland, the eldest child of Robert (Bob) Fogwill, who worked in the Newfoundland Railway freight office, and Evelyn Horwood. Porter attended the Holloway School and Prince of Wales College in St. John's. As a teenager, Porter was part of the petition drive for confederation between Newfoundland and Canada. Following her graduation, she worked as a shorthand typist with the Department of Justice.

In 1953, she married John Porter. The couple had four children: Kathy, Ann, John, and Stephen. The family lived in Corner Brook and Fortune, Newfoundland and Labrador before returning to St. John's. John Porter died in 1983; John Porter Jr. died in 2016.

When their youngest child entered high school, Porter started work at the A. C. Hunter Library. She was introduced to the writing of Margaret Duley and met other aspiring writers.

== Writing career ==
One of Porter's first-published poems appeared in 1943, but she became serious about writing in 1962. In 1963, she began having articles, reviews, short stories and poetry published in Maclean's, Chatelaine, Star Weekly and Saturday Night. Her works were then further published in the Quill & Quire, The Fiddlehead, The Antigonish Review and the Journal of Canadian Fiction. At the beginning of her writing career, Porter based most of her stories out of England, Scotland, or the United States because she believed that nobody was interested in stories about Newfoundland.

It was not until 1973 that she devoted her full-time to writing. By then, Porter's short stories, articles, poems, plays and reviews were published throughout Canada and abroad. In 1977, she collaborated with Bernice Morgan and Geraldine Rubia on writing From this Place, an anthology from women writers of Newfoundland and Labrador. Porter's Below the Bridge was published in 1979, a story about her childhood in St. John's. It was later adapted to audiobook format. Porter said,

One experience that I never had again is the one I had with writing Below the Bridge because that is probably the book that I most wanted to write. It's a memoir history about growing up on the South Side of St. John's in the 1930s and 1940s. That was a book I had to write.

Porter's first novel, January, February, June or July (1988), took on the then-taboo subject of abortion. This was followed by A Long and Lonely Ride (1991) and Finishing School (2007). Her most recent publication is the poetry collection Full Circle. Porter's work has been said to construct narratives "that focus on commonplace events in order to examine the motivations, material conditions, constraints and desires that inform women's actions and responses in apparently non-dramatic situations."

Porter was a founding member of the Writers' Union of Canada (of which she has been given a lifetime membership), and served on the boards of PEN and the Writers Alliance of Newfoundland and Labrador (WANL). Porter taught creative writing with Memorial University Extension Arts from 1976-1990 and with the division of Continuing Studies from 1991. She also worked with the Visiting Artists' Program of the Newfoundland Teachers' Association visiting schools to impart an appreciation of literature to school children. Porter was also a founding member of the Newfoundland Writer's Guild. As part of that group, she helped bring Metroverse, a Canada Council initiative placing poetry on city buses, to St. John's. This project led her to get involved with a similar one in Alberta called "Take the Poetry Route" that put pieces of poetry inside buses in Edmonton, Lethbridge, Fort McMurray, St. Albert, Sherwood Park, and Medicine Hat.

== Political life ==
Porter was heavily involved in the women's movement in the early 1970s. She was also a founding member of the Newfoundland Status of Women Council. In the decade between 1975 and 1985, Porter ran for election to the Canadian Parliament as a New Democratic Party representative four times. She ran in the riding of Mount Pearl, a suburb of St. John's, Newfoundland.

Porter's political goals were to get the economy back on track and to gain equality for women. Porter has been described as "an outstanding candidate with an enormous commitment to her community". Her audience also stated that: "Helen Porter will fight for real change for the benefit of all Newfoundlanders." In 2003 The Helen Porter Fund was established to help women NDP candidates. She marched for causes and protested events from the Vietnam War to a Metrobus strike to St. John's heritage preservation.

== Awards ==
At least fifteen of Porter's works were honoured with awards in the Newfoundland and Labrador Arts and Letters Competitions throughout the 1960s and 1970s. This included Bus Ride, a conversation between two women coming home from bingo; this later became a radio play broadcast on CBC Radio as well as a one act play performed at a festival on the upper concourse of the St. John's Arts and Culture Centre.

Porter's novel January, February, June or July won the Young Adult Canadian Book Award from the Canadian Library Association in 1989, and was short-listed for Books in Canada W. H. Smith Best First Novel Award. Porter also received the year's lifetime achievement award for her length of time as a leading figure in the Guild. Porter received the Newfoundland & Labrador Arts Council's Lifetime Achievement Award in 1993. Memorial University of Newfoundland granted her an Honorary Doctorate of Letters in 1997. She was appointed Member of the Order of Canada (CM)) in December 2015. It was presented during a special ceremony in St. John's. That same year a footbridge spanning the Waterford River was dedicated to her.

== The Helen Fogwill Porter Fund ==
In March 2003, the Newfoundland and Labrador New Democratic Party launched a fund in Porter's name. The fund aids women who are seeking to run as an NDP representative. The fund assists women at the provincial level in general and by elections. The financial assistance provides child care, campaign costs and household assistance. The Helen Fogwill Porter Fund also support conferences where female candidates can meet with each other. Nancy Riche stated, "The province needs more women in the legislature. If Helen had won in one of the elections in which she ran, she would have made more than a difference. She would have changed the political landscape of Newfoundland and Labrador."

== Works ==
=== Articles ===
- People I Should Like to Meet (1945)
- Growing Up on the South Side. The Atlantic Advocate (September 1965): 35-39.
- But Where Is Everything? (1975)
- To rearrange the past. Books in Canada 23:1 (1994): 21-23.
- The Road Taken (2000)
- My History Lessons (2000)
- It would have been our 47th anniversary. National Post (2000-10-18)
- OK, so my meals weren't exactly gourmet. National Post (2002-07-08)

=== Books ===
- From this Place - with Bernice Morgan and Geraldine Rubia (1977; ISBN 0-920502-02-4)
- Below the Bridge (1980; ISBN 0-919948-72-3)
- January, February, June or July (1988; ISBN 0-920911-27-7)
- A Long and Lonely Ride (1991; ISBN 1-55081-011-1)
- We Came From Over the Sea, British War Brides in Newfoundland - with Barbara B. Barrett C.M., Eileen Dicks, Isobel Brown, Hilda Chaulk Murray (1996)
- Finishing School (2007; ISBN 978-1-895900-88-0)

=== Poems ===
- The Business of Getting Up (1943)
- She's Over Eighty, You Know (1950)
- They Do It Every Summer (1954)
- The Children Are Gone (1979)
- Moratorium (1999)
- To My Son
- Sunday Best (1992)
- Food for Thought (1996)
- Gwenda (1999)
- Full Circle (2018; ISBN 978-1-550817-13-3)

=== Plays and short stories ===
- Teen-Age Tragedy (1946)
- For Every Man an Island (1982; ISBN 0-919519-09-1)
- The Five- Dollar Bet (1969)
- Moving Day
- Hot Night In July (1991)
