= Louise Dandurand =

Canadian political scientist

- Born: 1950
- Died: 2016 (aged 65–66)
- Education: University of Montreal; University of Toronto
- Awards: National Order of Quebec
- Scientific career
- Fields: Political science
- Workplaces: University of Ottawa; NSERC; SSHRC; Université du Québec à Montréal

Louise Dandurand (1950–2016) was a Canadian political scientist and administrator of university research in Canada.

== Education and early career ==
Dandurand earned an MA in the history of science from Université de Montréal in 1973, and a PhD in political science from University of Toronto in 1982. Early in her career, she taught for five years in the Department of Political Science at University of Ottawa. She then spent more than 35 years in the administration of university research.

== Career ==
Dandurand's positions as an academic administrator included director of policy and planning at the Natural Sciences and Engineering Research Council of Canada, executive director of the Social Sciences and Humanities Research Council, vice-president of research and planning at the Université du Québec à Montréal, president and CEO of the Fonds de recherche du Québec - Société et culture (fr), and vice-president of research and graduate studies at Concordia University. She was president of the Association francophone pour le savoir (ACFAS) between 2012 and 2015.

Dandurand regularly spoke in the Canadian press as president of ACFAS regarding provincial and federal research policies, and in defense of scientific research and research funding. In 2015 she advocated against the restrictions by Prime Minister Stephen Harper's government on public communication by federal researchers, and for French-language research in Canada.

Dandurand was the co-author with Hélène P. Tremblay of a report on organizational and budgetary decentralization at the Université du Québec à Montréal.

== Awards ==
Dandurand received the Prize of the Association of University Research Administrators of Quebec in 2011, and she was promoted to officer of the National Order of Quebec in 2016. In 2011, Concordia University created an excellence scholarship of worth $15,000 in her name to recognize her contribution as Vice-President of Research and Graduate Studies.
