= Diz Glithero =

Canadian Professor

- Citizenship: Canadian
- Awards: King Charles III Coronation Medal Governor General of Canada Meritorious Service Medal Alex Trebek Medal for Geographic Literacy Mitacs Award for Outstanding Innovation – Post Doctoral

Academic background
- Education: University of Ottawa Dalhousie University Queen's University at Kingston

Academic work
- Discipline: Social Science, Education

Dr. Lisa (Diz) Glithero is a Canadian interdisciplinary educator and social science researcher at the Canadian Ocean Literacy Coalition, specializing in ocean and climate learning, public engagement, and action. She has received multiple prestigious awards for her work in this field.

Digital poster of Diz Glithero created by Ingenium - Canada's Museum of Science and Innovation

== Education ==
Dr. Glithero obtained a bachelor's degree from Dalhousie University in 1996. She then received a Bachelor of Education from Queen's University in 2001 and a Master of Education from the same institution in 2004. She completed a PhD from the University of Ottawa in 2015.

== Career ==
Dr. Glithero is the executive director of the Canadian Ocean Literacy Coalition (COLC). COLC is a Canadian-based centre for ocean literacy collaboration, research, and innovation, and the lead organization behind Ocean Week Canada. Dr. Glithero co-led the production of "Land, Water, Ocean, Us: A Canadian Ocean Literacy Strategy" the first of its kind globally.

Dr. Glithero is recognized as an inspiring contributor in ocean science and literacy, and is featured on a digital poster as part of the Ingenium - Canada's Museums of Science and Innovation Women in STEM initiative. This initiative promote careers for equity-deserving groups in STEM, makes equity-deserving groups in STEM more visible, highlights issues of inequality, and celebrates achievements.

Dr. Glithero is an active leader in the United Nations Decade of Ocean Science for Sustainable Development (2021–2030). Dr. Glithero is a co-chair of the Ocean Decade Vision 2030 Expert Group on 'Challenge 10 – Changing society's relationship with the ocean', she is a member of the Steering Committee for the Ocean Decade Coordination Office 'Connecting People and the Ocean', and a member of the coordination team for the 'Ocean Literacy With All' Ocean Decade Programme. These initiatives are designing and implementing transformative local and global research-based activities and projects to build capacity and to drive the behavior change needed to achieve an ocean literate society. Dr. Glithero is also one of seven Ocean Decade Champions recognized by Fisheries and Oceans Canada who are working to mobilize the Canadian ocean community and foster innovative and transformative science-based actions.

== Awards ==
Dr. Glithero is a recipient of a 2025 King Charles III Coronation Medal, in the category of Nature and Environment, for advocating ocean conservation through collaborative and interdisciplinary projects, research and public education on a national scale.

In 2021, Dr. Glithero received the Mitacs Award for Outstanding Innovation – Post Doctoral for spearheading an all-women team that led to the world's first national ocean literacy strategy.

In 2020, Dr. Glithero was awarded the prestigious "Alex Trebek Medal for Geographic Literacy," awarded by The Royal Canadian Geographical Society. This medal is awarded to individuals who contribute significantly to geographic literacy.

In 2016 Dr. Glithero was awarded a Meritorious Service Medal in 2016 from the Governor General of Canada for her work environmental education and youth engagement.
