= Cristina Sampaio =

Portuguese cartoonist and illustrator

- Born: 1960 (age 65–66); Lisbon, Portugal
- Occupation: cartoonist • children's book illustrator

Cristina Sampaio (born 1960) is a Portuguese children's book illustrator and newspaper, magazine and animated cartoonist who has won many awards for her work.

== Early life ==
Sampaio was born in the Portuguese capital of Lisbon in 1960. She studied at the Lisbon School of Fine Arts, graduating in painting. She continues to live in Lisbon.

== Career ==
She began working as an illustrator and cartoonist for magazines and newspapers in 1986, and in 1987 did the first of over 20 illustrations of children's books. The newspapers she has worked for have included Público, O Independente and Expresso in Portugal, as well as international papers such as The New York Times and The Boston Globe in the US, Kleine Zeitung and Die Presse in Austria and Alternatives économiques and Courrier International in France. In 1998, she created the set design for the children's musical Bom Dia, Benjamim!, a theatrical presentation performed at the Belém Cultural Centre near Lisbon, based on a successful television series. She is a member of Cartooning for Peace. Sampaio has produced multimedia presentations for Ciência Viva and others and, more recently, has worked with the Spam Cartoon collective to produce animated shorts for SIC Notícias and RTP3.

== Awards and recognition ==
Sampaio has received many awards for her work including the Society for News Design Award of Excellence in 2002, 2005 and 2009, the Prémio Stuart Award for Cartoons (2006 and 2010), a First Prize for an editorial cartoon from the World Press Cartoon (2007), where she also received two honourable mentions in 2009 and 2015, and the Society for News Design of Pamplona Silver Medal 2009. In 2009, the Amadora Comic Strip Festival awarded her the prize for best children's illustration for the book Canta o Galo Gordo (The Fat Rooster sings). In 2023 she was one of 16 finalists for the European Cartoon Award.

== Controversy ==
In 2023 an animated cartoon by Sampaio was broadcast on RTP3. It showed a police officer training in a shooting range, shooting with increasing intensity the darker the colour of his target became. The intention of the cartoon, inspired by events in France when a young Frenchman was killed by the police, leading to civil disturbances, was to criticise the racism of the security forces. She was condemned by both the left and right of the Portuguese political spectrum and received "dozens of threats and hate messages". Both she and the broadcaster were the subject of criminal complaints by the Portuguese police, even though they stressed that the target of the cartoon was the French police, not the Portuguese.

== Exhibitions ==
Sampaio's work has been presented in numerous group and solo exhibitions, in Portugal and elsewhere. They include:

- Combat Illustrations 88/89, The Commune (1989)
- Universal Declaration of Human Rights, Centro Cultural da Malaposta, Lisbon (1996)
- 25 Comics commemorating the 25th of April, Cordoaria Nacional, Belém, Lisbon (1999)
- 500 years of Brazil, Casino Estoril and Museu da Imagem e do Som do Rio de Janeiro (2000)
- The Drawing of the Day, a decade of illustrations in Público, at Bedeteca de Lisboa (2001).
- Na Ponta da Linha, Cartoon Xira (2003).
- Things that happen, Cordoaria Nacional (2004)
- World Press Cartoon – Prix 2005-2008, Calouste Gulbenkian Foundation, Paris (2008)
- Cartoons from the 27 Countries of the EU, Zappeion Megaron, Athens (2008)
- Cartoon Xira, Vila Franca de Xira (2009 and 2010)
- Expressions – International Cartoon Exhibition, Global Forum on Freedom of Expression, Drøbak, Norway (2009)
- Dessine-moi la Paix en Méditerranée, Marseille (2009)
- One Century, Ten Pencils, One Hundred Drawings, Museum of the Presidency of the Republic, Lisbon (2009)
- Taches d'Opinion, Mémorial Cité de l'Histoire, Caen (2010)
- Res Publica, Calouste Gulbenkian Foundation, Lisbon (2010)
- Exhibitions - Cristina Sampaio (Portugal). European Cartoon Centre. Kruishoutem, Belgium (2019)
- At the tip of the pencil, women's rights: caricature, cartoon and freedom of expression. Le Crayon. Travelling exhibition. (2018)
