= Mike Estabrook =

Mike Estabrook may refer to:

- Mike Estabrook (artist) (born 1970), American visual artist
- Mike Estabrook (umpire) (born 1976), Major League Baseball umpire
