= Wilf Perreault =

Canadian artist (born 1947)

Wilf Perreault RCA SOM
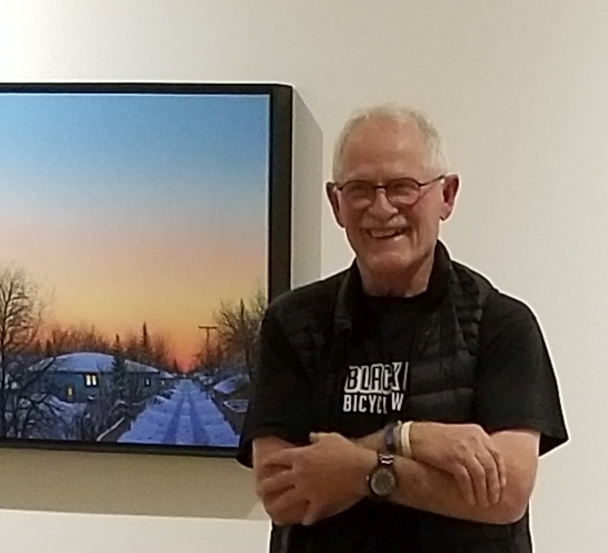
- Born: Wilfrid Donat Joseph Perreault; October 6, 1947 (age 78) near Albertville, Saskatchewan, Canada
- Education: University of Saskatchewan
- Known for: Painting, Printmaking, Sculpture

Wilf Perreault RCA SOM (born October 6, 1947) is a Canadian artist and sculptor.

== Biography ==
Wilf Perreault was born on October 6, 1947, on his family's farm, halfway between Albertville and Henribourg, 25 kilometres (16 mi) northeast of Prince Albert, Saskatchewan, to parents Armand and Eveline Perreault (née Nobert). In 1953, Armand Perreault moved his family to Saskatoon.

While growing up in Saskatoon, Perreault received private art lessons from Herb Wilde, a former student of the Saskatchewan painter, Ernest Lindner, Bill Epp and Louise Malkin. Perreault is known for his landscapes and paintings of alleyways. His work has been influenced by artists such as Reta Cowley and Dorothy Knowles. His formal art training began at the University of Saskatchewan, where his interest in representational painting conflicted with the New York–style abstraction, prevalent in Saskatchewan at that time. Under the instruction of Otto Rogers and Bill Epp, he instead focused on abstract sculpture.

Perreault graduated with a Bachelor of Fine Arts in 1970 and a Bachelor of Education in 1971 before moving to Regina to teach. In 1981 Perreault became the artist-in-residence with the Regina Catholic School Board. Part of his work during this time was the creation of murals and stained-glass windows for the Canadian Martyrs Church.

Perreault finds comparisons between his career as a teacher and his art stating: "Teaching is a bit like painting back-alleys. It's taking an ordinary subject and turning it into something beautiful: taking students who aren't turned on to art and seeing the lights go on for them once they discover art. It's really something wonderful."

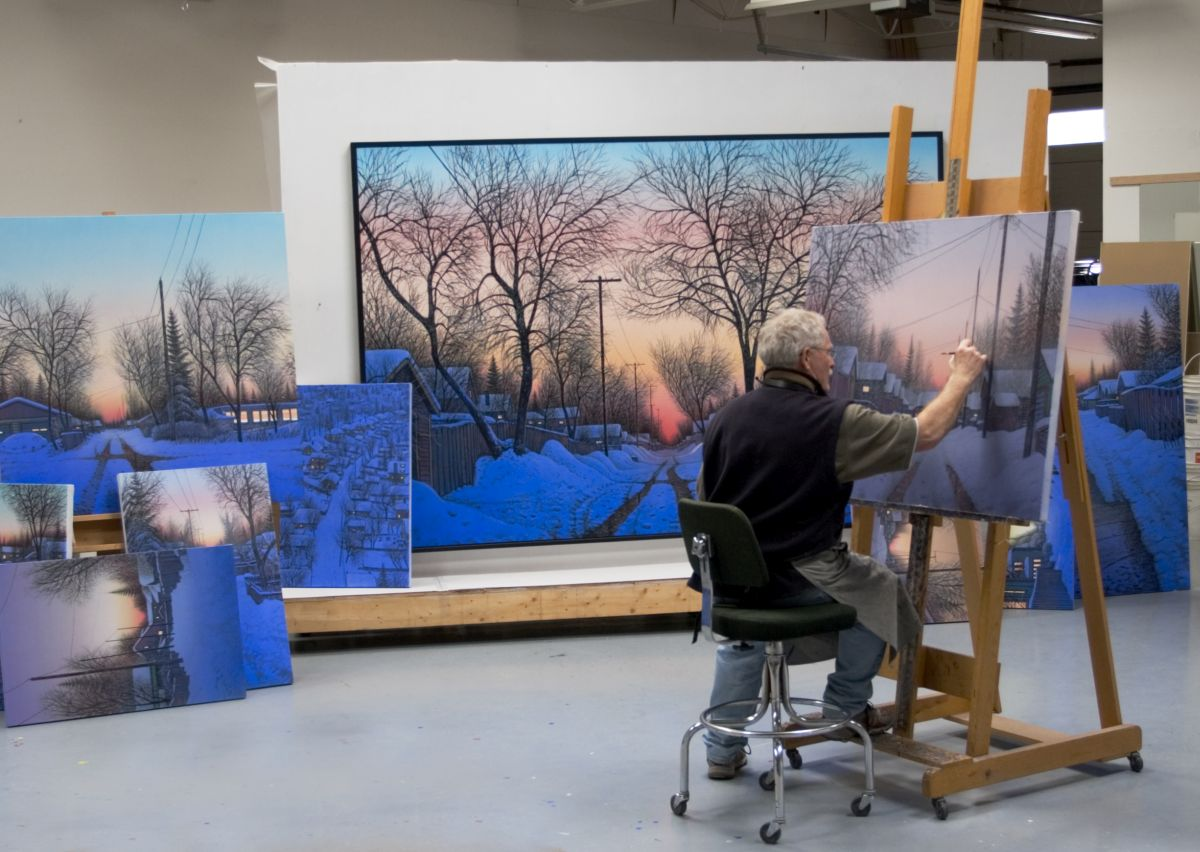
Wilf Perreault painting at an easel in his studio, 2007

== Awards and press ==
Perreault's work has been included in several exhibitions, commissions and awards in and outside of Saskatchewan. In 1989 he was chosen to represent Canada and was awarded a Silver Medal in Les Jeux de la Francophonie in Maroc, Africa—a juried exhibition of work by artists from 42 countries. He is a member of the Royal Canadian Academy of Arts, and was awarded the Saskatchewan Order of Merit in 2016.

In 2014, Wilf Perreault: In The Alley, a Retrospective Show was held at the MacKenzie Art Gallery. The show covered over 40 years of work and over 40 pieces of art, plus many of his silkscreens. Alongside the exhibition, an eponymous titled book and film, were produced, both detailing his process of getting inspirations for the resultant works of art that were on display.

== Gallery of artworks ==
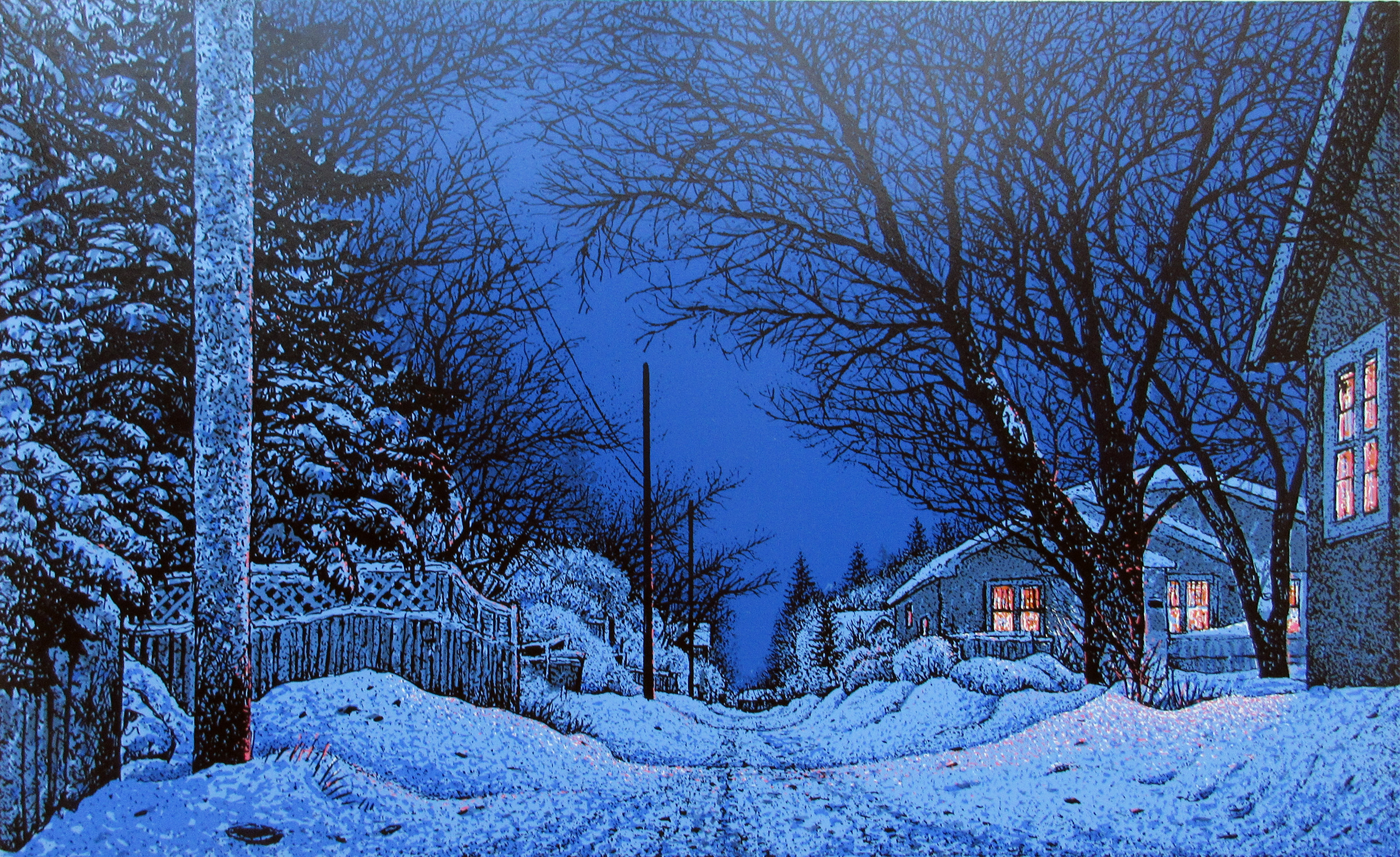
Perreault, Wilf- Evening Jazz, original silkscreen on Lexan, 17 5/8 in × 11 1/2 in (450 mm × 290 mm), 2016

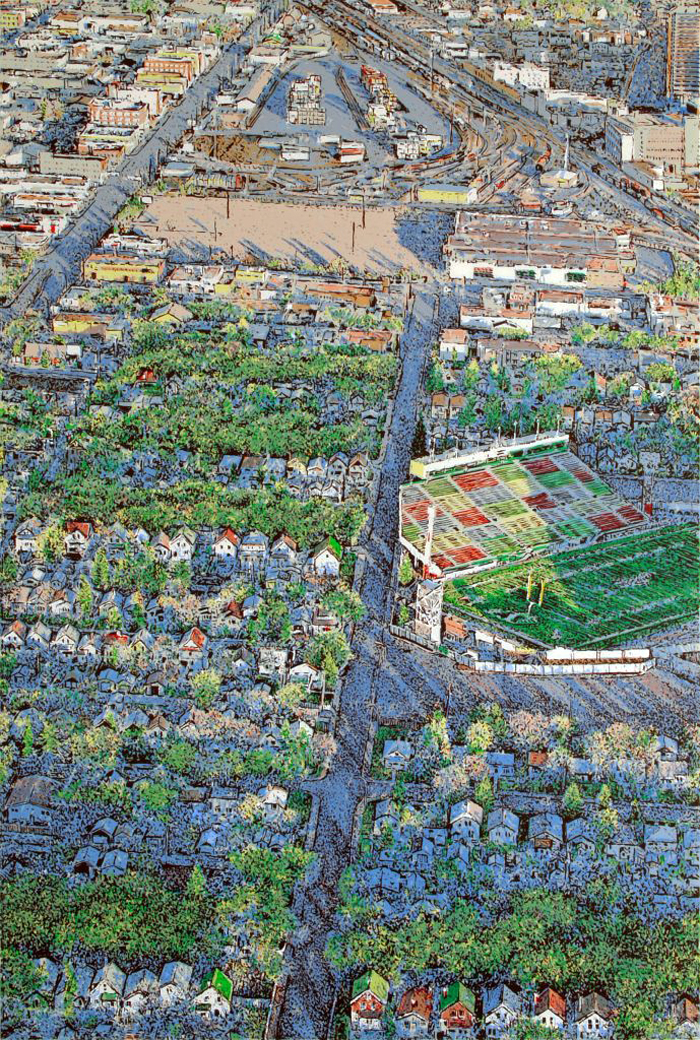
Perreault, Wilf- Piffles' Dream, original silkscreen on Lexan, 18 in × 12 in (460 mm × 300 mm), 2010

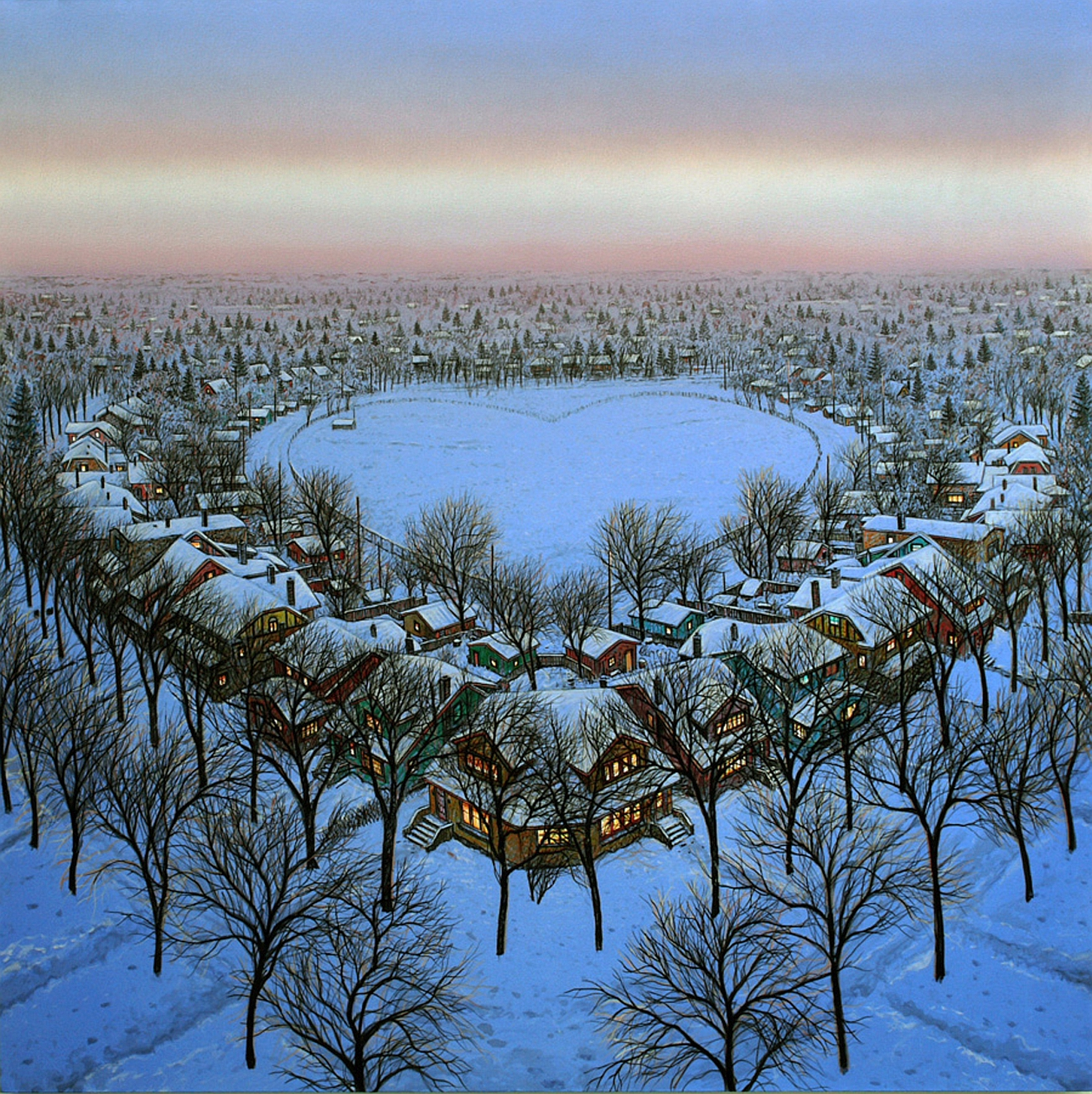
Perreault, Wilf- Heart in the Park, acrylic on canvas, 72 in × 72 1/2 in (1,830 mm × 1,840 mm), 2009

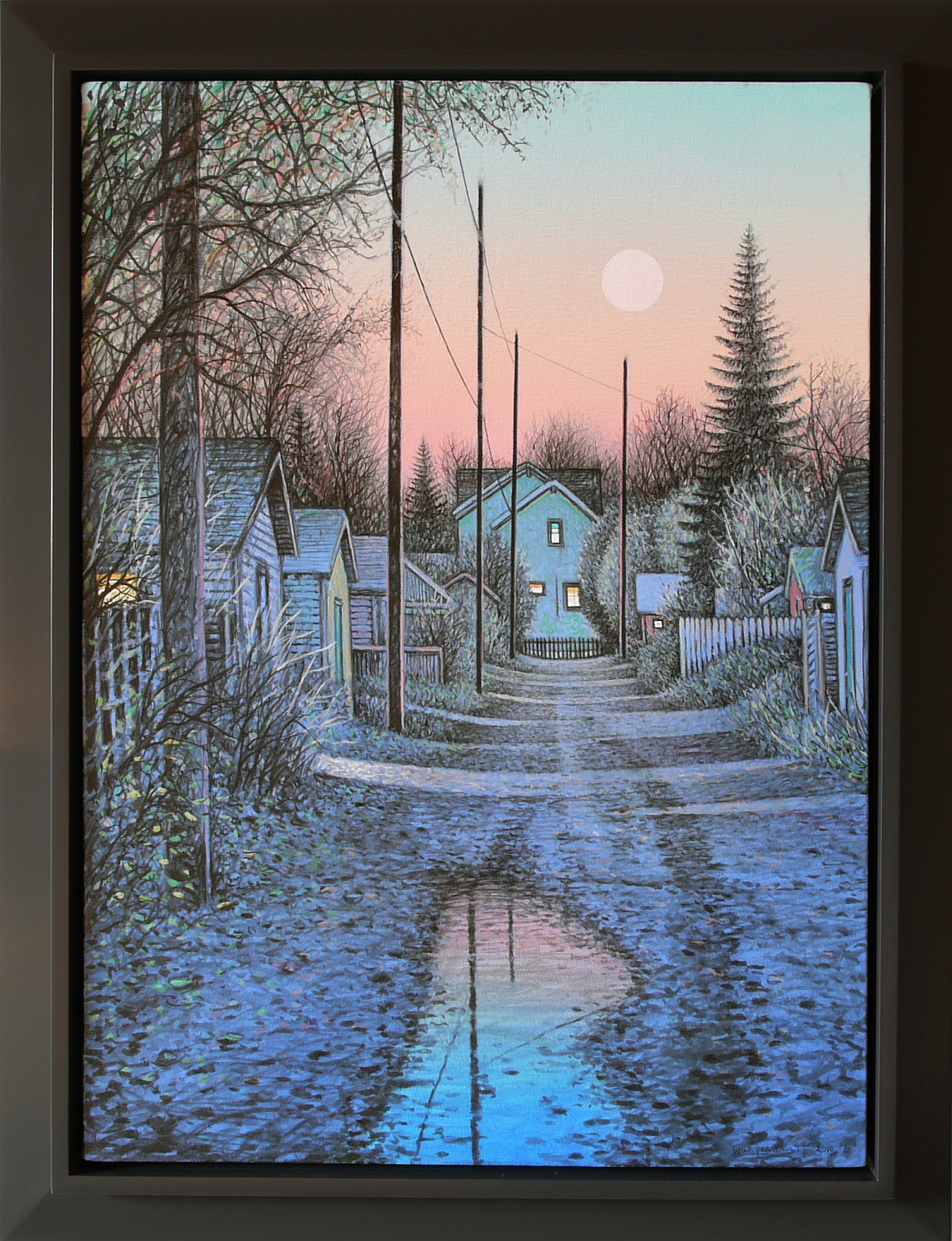
Perreault, Wilf- College Ave, acrylic on canvas, 28 in × 21 in (710 mm × 530 mm), 2010

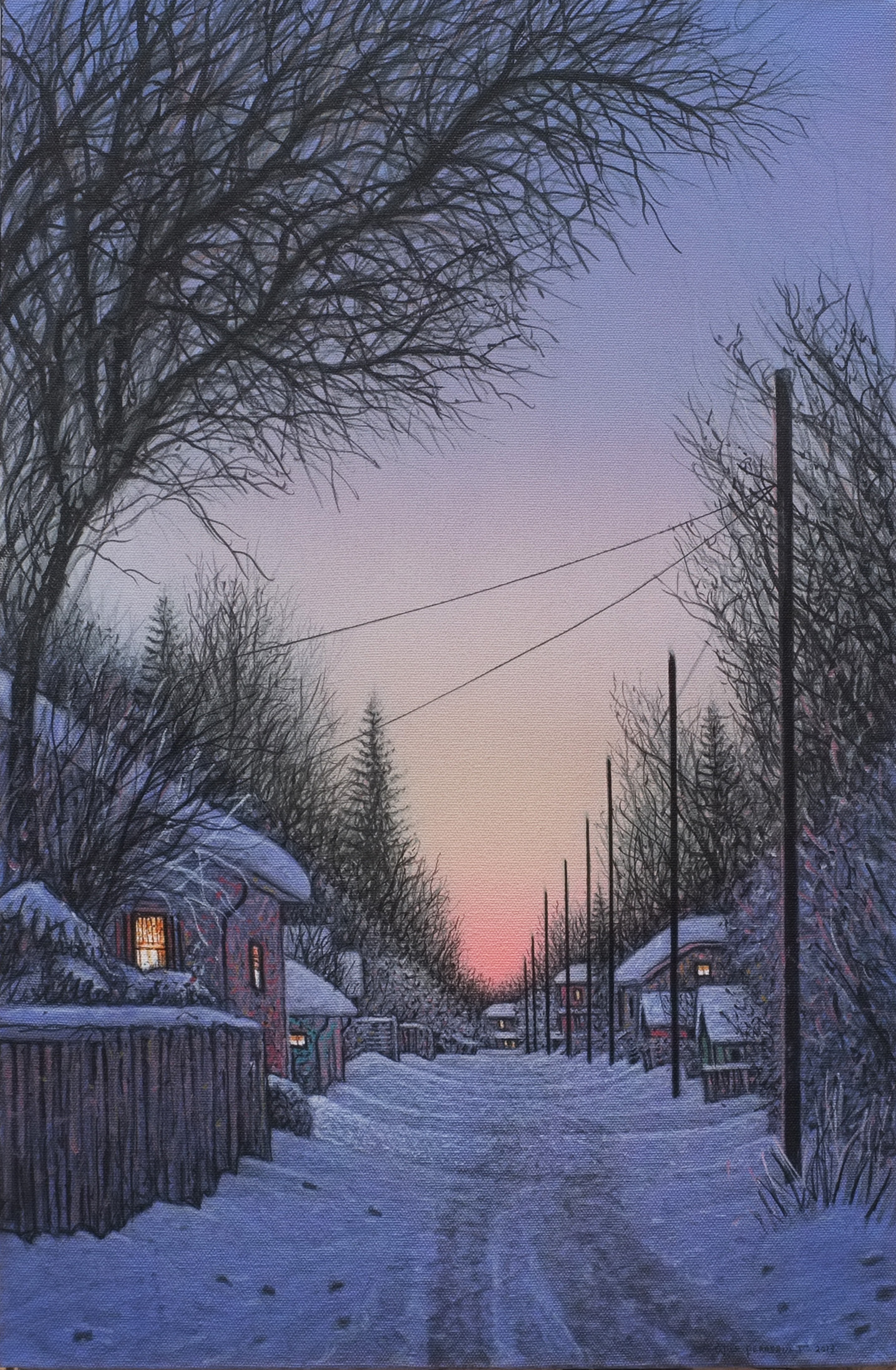
Perreault, Wilf- Winter Trees, acrylic on canvas, 23 in × 15 in (580 mm × 380 mm), 2013

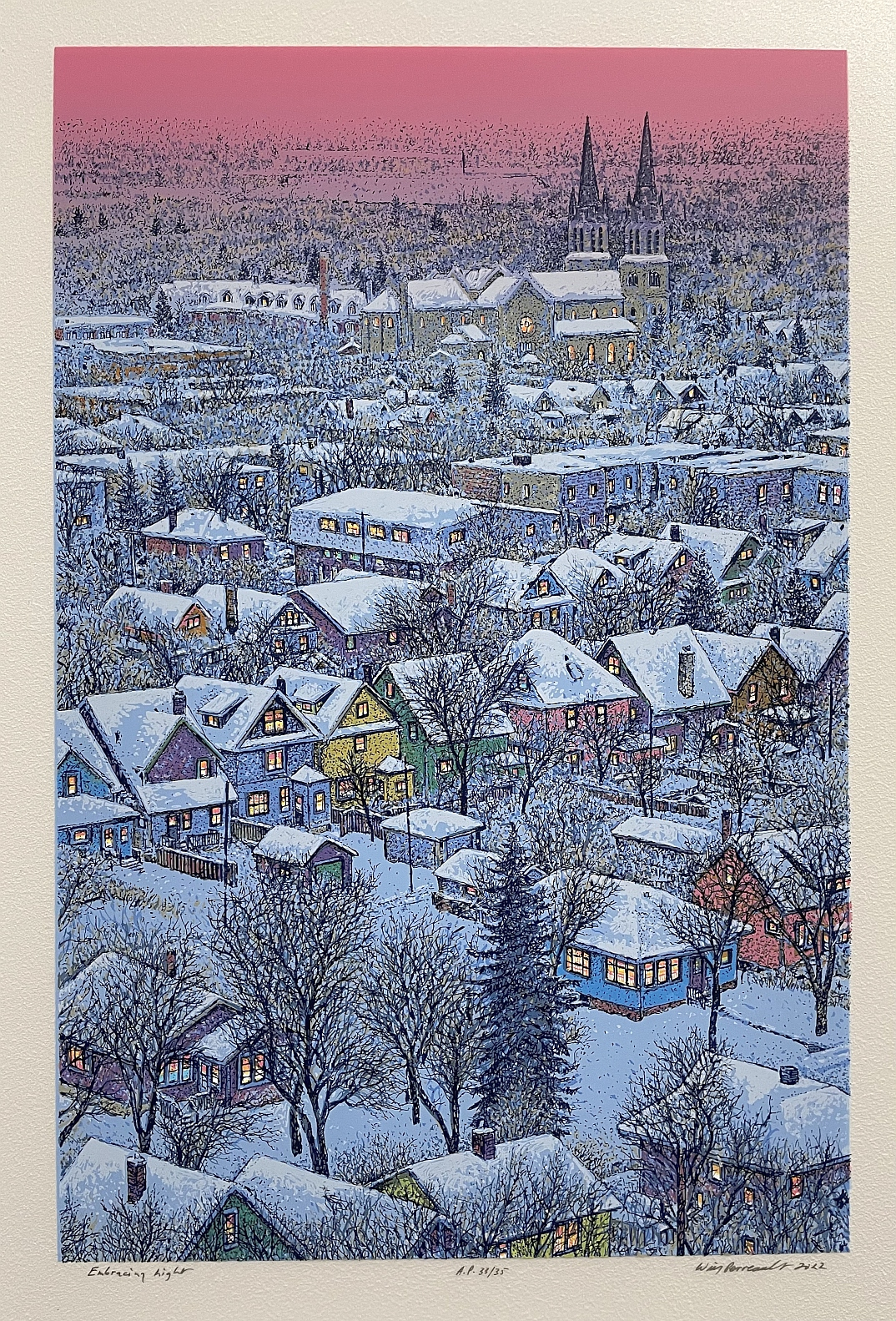
Perreault, Wilf- Embracing Light, original silkscreen on Lexan, 18 in × 12 in (460 mm × 300 mm), 2022
