= Johanne Berry =

Canadian businesswoman

Johanne Berry CM is a Canadian businesswoman. She is the founder of Tele-Ressources Staffing Services Ltd, an employment agency established in 1985 and headquartered in Montreal, Quebec, Canada.

== Career ==
Berry was born in Montreal Canada to an entrepreneur father. In high school, she worked as a secretary at Bell Canada before joining the Organizing Committee for the Olympic Games. As she grew older, she ran her own clothing store in her parents' garage before being recruited by an investment firm at the age of 23.

Eventually growing bored at the investment firm, Berry decided to open her own agency in 1985. She sold her home and car to fund a 1200 square foot sub-let as she began to establish Télé-Ressources. By 1996, Tele-Ressources Staffing Services Ltd became the first Montreal recruiting agency to obtain a ISO 9000 certification. As a result, she received the Women of Distinction Award from YWCA of Montreal and later earned the Mercuriades Company of the Year award.

In 2010, Berry received the Association of Canadian Search, Employment & Staffing Services Award of Excellence. Three years later, she was honoured with the prix Réalisations by the Réseau des femmes d’affaires du Québec in collaboration with Les Affaires. In 2014, Berry was elected a member of the Conseil du patronat du Québec Club entrepreneurs. Berry became a Member of the Order of Canada in 2016.
