= Carole A. Estabrooks =

Canadian applied health services researcher

- Born: 1954 (age 71–72); New Brunswick
- Citizenship: Canadian
- Awards: Member of the Order of Canada (2016); Fellow, Royal Society of Canada (2020); Canadian Academy of Nursing (2020); Fellow, Canadian Academy of Health Sciences (2007); Fellow, American Academy of Nursing (2011); Canada Research Chair Tier 1 (2011–2025)

Academic background
- Education: University of New Brunswick (BN); University of Alberta (MN, PhD); University of Toronto (Postdoc)

Academic work
- Institutions: University of Alberta

Carole Anne Estabrooks CM FCAHS (born 1954) is a Canadian nurse scientist and researcher known for her research on the quality of care and quality of work life in long-term care (LTC) homes and nursing homes. She is a Professor in the Faculty of Nursing at the University of Alberta and held a Canada Research Chair in Knowledge Translation (Tier 1) from 2011 to 2025.

Estabrooks is the Scientific Director of the Translating Research in Elder Care (TREC) program, a longitudinal research initiative focused on improving the quality of care and quality of life for residents of long-term care homes in Canada and quality of work life for paid staff in long-term care homes. She has been listed among the most highly cited researchers in her field and was appointed a Member of the Order of Canada in 2016.

Her research on COVID-19 in long-term care homes, including a widely cited 2020 paper in FACETS on the crisis of mortality in nursing homes during the pandemic, has informed national and international policy on infection prevention and resident care. She has published over 300 peer-reviewed journal articles and has been cited more than 30,000 times on Google Scholar.

== Early life and education ==
Estabrooks earned a Bachelor of Nursing (BN) from the University of New Brunswick in 1977, a Master of Nursing (MN) from the University of Alberta in 1987, and a PhD from the University of Alberta in 1997. She completed a postdoctoral fellowship at the Institute for Clinical Evaluative Sciences and the University of Toronto in 2000.

Before entering academia, she worked as a clinical nurse in critical care at Saint Joseph's Hospital in Saint John, New Brunswick, and at Royal Columbian Hospital in New Westminster, British Columbia. She later served as Head Nurse and Nurse Manager in Intensive Care at Royal Columbian Hospital, and as Director of Nursing for Clinical Education, Research, and Quality Assurance at Royal Alexandra Hospital in Edmonton, Alberta.

== Career ==
Estabrooks joined the Faculty of Nursing at the University of Alberta as Assistant Professor in 1997, was promoted to Associate Professor in 2001, and to Full Professor in 2005. She held a Canada Research Chair in Knowledge Translation (Tier 2) from 2005 to 2011, and a Canada Research Chair (Tier 1) from 2011 to 2025, both funded by the Canadian Institutes of Health Research (CIHR).

She has held adjunct appointments in the Department of Public Health Sciences at the University of Alberta's School of Public Health, and was Principal of the Centre for Knowledge Transfer at the University of Alberta from 2001 to 2005.

== Research ==
Estabrooks's research focuses on improving the quality of care and quality of life for residents of long-term care (LTC) and nursing homes, and the quality of work life for staff who care for them. Her work is rooted in Mode 2 discovery and aims to develop solutions for a sector that is under-studied and whose residents and staff are marginalised and vulnerable.

She is the principal investigator of the Translating Research in Elder Care (TREC) program, established in 2007. TREC is a multi-province longitudinal research program that studies how organisational context affects knowledge translation and care quality in long-term care homes across British Columbia, Alberta, and Manitoba. The program has received over $130 million in total research funding. She is a co-principal investigator for the Atlantic Research Collaboration in LTC (ARC-LTC) that was established in 2023 premised on the TREC program.

Estabrooks developed the Alberta Context Tool (ACT), a validated instrument for assessing organisational context in healthcare settings, which has been adapted for use in multiple countries and translated into six languages. She also developed the INFORM (Improving Nursing Home Care through Feedback on PerfoRMance Data) and SCOPE (Safer Care for Older Persons in Residential Environments) interventions.

== COVID-19 pandemic research ==
During the COVID-19 pandemic, Estabrooks led several studies on the impact of the pandemic on long-term care home staff and residents. Her 2020 paper in FACETS, "Restoring trust: COVID-19 and the future of long-term care," was cited more than 338 times and addressed the crisis of excess mortality in nursing homes during the pandemic. She led CIHR-funded studies on the impact of COVID-19 on LTC staff and residents, and on infection prevention and control measures in LTC homes, including studies funded by the COVID-19 Immunity Task Force.

Her research during the pandemic also examined burnout, compassion fatigue, and post-traumatic stress disorder among care aides in nursing homes, as documented in studies published in the Journal of the American Medical Directors Association and BMC Health Services Research in 2025.

== Awards and honours ==
- 2016: Member of the Order of Canada, "for her contributions to improving the quality of care in long-term care facilities."
- 2020: Fellow, Royal Society of Canada (FRSC).
- 2018: J. Gordin Kaplan Award for Excellence in Research, University of Alberta.
- 2018: Inductee, International Nurse Researcher Hall of Fame, Sigma Theta Tau International.
- 2014: Betty Havens Knowledge Translation Prize ($20,000), Institute of Aging, CIHR.
- 2011: Fellow, American Academy of Nursing (FAAN).
- 2010: Distinguished Academic Award, Confederation of Alberta Faculty Associations.
- 2007: Fellow, Canadian Academy of Health Sciences (FCAHS).
- 2007: Alumni Award of Distinction, University of New Brunswick.
- 2022: Mary Morrison Davis Award for Outstanding Contribution to Gerontology, Alberta Association on Gerontology.
- 2024: Top Trailblazers for Culture Change, Schlegel-UW Research Institute for Aging.
- 2025: 2024 Editors' Choice Award, Journal of the American Geriatrics Society.

== Selected publications ==
- Estabrooks, C.A. (2020). "Restoring trust: COVID-19 and the future of long-term care." FACETS, 5(1), 1018–1024. Cited 338 times. https://doi.org/10.1139/facets-2020-0056
- Royal Society of Canada. (2020). Restoring Trust: COVID-19 and the Future of Long-Term Care. http://rsc-src.ca/en/events/covid-19-policy-briefing/long-term-care/restoring-trust-covid-19-and-future-long-term-care
- Royal Society of Canada. (2024). Repair and Recovery in Long-Term Care: Restoring Trust in the Aftermath of COVID-19 (2020-2023). https://rsc-src.ca/en/covid-19-note-dinformation-politique/repair-and-recovery-in-long-term-care-restoring-trust-in
- Estabrooks, C.A. et al. (2009). "Translating research in elder care: an introduction to a study." BMC Health Services Research, 9, 222. PMID: 19671166. https://pubmed.ncbi.nlm.nih.gov/19671166/
- Saeidzadeh, S. et al. & Estabrooks, C.A. (2025). "Recovering after COVID-19: A comparison of burnout levels among care aides from 2014 to 2024." Journal of the American Medical Directors Association, 26(1), 105842. https://doi.org/10.1016/j.jamda.2025.105842
- Wang, A. et al. & Estabrooks, C.A. (2025). "Association of compassion fatigue and work context with post-traumatic stress disorder symptoms among care aides in nursing homes." Social Psychiatry and Psychiatric Epidemiology. https://doi.org/10.1007/s00127-025-02700-0
- Estabrooks, C.A. (2025). "Reflections on co-production as a mode of knowledge production." International Journal of Health Policy and Management, 14(1), 1–3. https://doi.org/10.34172/ijhpm.8909
- Estabrooks, C.A., Hoben, M., Poss, J.W., Chamberlain, S.A., Thompson, G.N., Silvius, J.L., & Norton, P.G. (2015). "Dying in a nursing home: Treatable symptom burden and its link to modifiable features of work context." Journal of the American Medical Directors Association, 16(6), 515–520. https://doi.org/10.1016/j.jamda.2015.02.007
- DeGraves, B.S., Titley, H., Duan, Y., Thorne, T.E., Banerjee, S., Ginsburg, L., Salma, J., Hegadoren, K., Angel, C., Keefe, J., Lanius, R., & Estabrooks, C.A. (2024). "Workforce resilience supporting staff in managing stress: A coherent breathing intervention for the long-term care workforce." Journal of the American Geriatrics Society, 72(3), 753–766. https://doi.org/10.1111/jgs.18727
- Estabrooks, C.A., Titley, H.K., Thorne, T., Banerjee, S., Feldman, H.H., Silvius, J., & Lanius, R.A. (2022). "A matter for life and death: Managing psychological trauma in care homes." Journal of the American Medical Directors Association, 23(7), 1123–1126. https://doi.org/10.1016/j.jamda.2022.02.007
- Minion, J.T., Huijer, H.M., Akintunde, T.Y., Hegadoren, K., Feldman, H.H., Lanius, R.A., Banerjee, S., Ginsburg, L.R., Silvius, J.L., Little, L.A., Norton, P.G. & Estabrooks, C.A. (2026). "We feel like we don't matter": The work experience of caring for long-term care residents with suspected trauma-related responsive behaviors. BMC Health Services Research, 26, 1051. https://doi.org/10.1186/s12913-026-14785-8
