= Viktor Ratushnyak =

- Віктор Ратушняк

Deputy Minister of Internal Affairs
- In office March 2010 – 4 March 2014

Personal details
- Born: Viktor Ivanovych Ratushnyak; 16 October 1959 (age 66) Vinnytsia Oblast, Ukraine, Soviet Union

Viktor Ivanovych Ratushnyak (Ukrainian: Віктор Іванович Ратушняк; born on 16 October 1959) is a Ukrainian politician, who had served as the Deputy Minister of Internal Affairs during Yanukovich's presidency and head of the Public Security Police Department until 4 March 2014.

== Biography ==
Viktor Ratushnyak was born in Vinnystia Oblast in Ukraine on 16 October 1959.

He graduated from the Nemyriv Pedagogical School in 1978, and the National Academy of Internal Affairs of Ukraine in 1997.

From 1978, he worked as a physical education teacher at an 8-year school in the Vinnytsia Oblast.

He began his service in the internal affairs bodies in 1982 as a policeman of the police patrol service in Kyiv. From December 1991 he worked as an inspector, senior inspector of the Department of Public Order Protection of the Department of Internal Affairs of Kyiv. From July 1992, he was the head of the department.

In December 1991, he was the Inspector, Senior Inspector of the Department of Public Order Protection of the Ministry of Internal Affairs of Kyiv. In June 1995, he became the Head of the Department of Public Order Protection of the Ministry of Internal Affairs in Kyiv. In May 2005, he was the Assistant Head of the State Security Service at the Main Directorate of the Ministry of Internal Affairs of Ukraine in Kyiv. In April 2007, he was the First Deputy Head of the Main Department of the Ministry of Internal Affairs of Ukraine in Kyiv.

In March 2010, Ratushnyak was appointed Deputy Minister of Internal Affairs of Ukraine as the Chief of Public Security Police.

=== Sanctions ===
The EU sanctions were imposed on Ratusnhyak for supporting the Yanukovych regime and violating laws.
