= Military ranks of Turkey =

The military ranks of Turkey are the military insignia used by the Turkish Armed Forces.

== Special insignia ==
The Chief of the Turkish General Staff is allowed to wear special insignia.

| Branch | Army | Air force | Navy |
|---|---|---|---|
| Insignia |
| Name | Genelkurmay başkanı |

== Turkish Land Forces ==
=== Officer ranks ===
| NATO code | OF-10 | OF-9 | OF-8 | OF-7 | OF-6 | OF-5 | OF-4 | OF-3 | OF-2 | OF-1 |
|---|---|---|---|---|---|---|---|---|---|---|---|---|---|
| Turkish Land Forces |
| Turkish Land Forces | Mareşal | Orgeneral | Korgeneral | Tümgeneral | Tuğgeneral | Albay | Yarbay | Binbaşı | Yüzbaşı | Üsteğmen | Teğmen | Asteğmen |
| Literal translation | Marshal | Army general | Corps general | Division general | Brigade general | Regiment chief | Vice chief | Leader of a thousand | Leader of a hundred | Senior lieutenant | Lieutenant | Junior lieutenant |
| U.S. equivalent | General of the Army | General | Lieutenant general | Major general | Brigadier general | Colonel | Lieutenant colonel | Major | Captain | First lieutenant | Second lieutenant | | Cadet / Officer candidate |

=== Other ranks ===
| NATO code | OR-9 | OR-8 | OR-7 | OR-6 | OR-5 | | | OR-4 | | OR-3 | | OR-2 | OR-1 |
|---|---|---|---|---|---|---|---|---|---|---|---|---|---|
| Turkish Land Forces | | | | | | | | | | | | | No insignia |
| Turkish Land Forces | Astsubay kıdemli başçavuş | Astsubay başçavuş | Astsubay kıdemli üstçavuş | Astsubay üstçavuş | Astsubay kıdemli çavuş | Astsubay çavuş | Astsubay astçavuş | Uzman çavuş | Çavuş | Uzman onbaşı | Onbaşı | | Er |
| Literal translation | Noncommissioned senior sergeant major | Noncommissioned sergeant major | Noncommissioned senior superior sergeant | Noncommissioned superior sergeant | Noncommissioned senior sergeant | Noncommissioned sergeant | Junior noncommissioned sergeant | Specialist sergeant | Sergeant | Specialist head of ten | Head of ten | Private |
| U.S. equivalent | Command sergeant major | Master sergeant | Sergeant first class | | Staff sergeant | | | Sergeant | | Corporal | | Private | Private |

== Turkish Air Forces ==
=== Officer ranks ===
| NATO code | OF-10 | OF-9 | OF-8 | OF-7 | OF-6 | OF-5 | OF-4 | OF-3 | OF-2 | OF-1 |
|---|---|---|---|---|---|---|---|---|---|---|---|---|---|
| Turkish Air Force |
| Turkish Air Force | Mareşal | Orgeneral | Korgeneral | Tümgeneral | Tuğgeneral | Albay | Yarbay | Binbaşı | Yüzbaşı | Üsteğmen | Teğmen | Asteğmen |
| U.S. equivalent | General of the Air Force | General | Lieutenant general | Major general | Brigadier general | Colonel | Lieutenant colonel | Major | Captain | First lieutenant | Second lieutenant | | Cadet / Officer trainee |

=== Other ranks ===
| NATO code | OR-9 | OR-8 | OR-7 | OR-6 | OR-5 | | | OR-4 | | OR-3 | | OR-2 | OR-1 |
|---|---|---|---|---|---|---|---|---|---|---|---|---|---|
| Turkish Air Force | | | | | | | | | | | | | No insignia |
| Turkish Air Force | Astsubay kıdemli başçavuş | Astsubay başçavuş | Astsubay kıdemli üstçavuş | Astsubay üstçavuş | Astsubay kıdemli çavuş | Astsubay çavuş | Astsubay astçavuş | Uzman çavuş | Çavuş | Uzman onbaşı | Onbaşı | | Er |
| U.S. equivalent | Chief master sergeant | Senior master sergeant | Master sergeant | | Technical sergeant | | | Staff sergeant | | Senior airman/ Sergeant | | Airman first class | Airman basic |

== Turkish Naval Forces ==
=== Officer ranks ===
| NATO code | OF-10 | OF-9 | OF-8 | OF-7 | OF-6 | OF-5 | OF-4 | OF-3 | OF-2 | OF-1 |
|---|---|---|---|---|---|---|---|---|---|---|---|---|---|
| Turkish Naval Forces |
| Turkish Naval Forces | Büyük amiral | Oramiral | Koramiral | Tümamiral | Tuğamiral | Albay | Yarbay | Binbaşı | Yüzbaşı | Üsteğmen | Teğmen | Asteğmen |
| U.S. equivalent | Fleet admiral | Admiral | Vice admiral | Rear admiral | Rear admiral (lower half) | Captain | Commander | Lieutenant commander | Lieutenant | Lieutenant (junior grade) | Ensign | | Midshipman / officer candidate |

Note: Commodores in the Turkish navy are not given special ranks or insignia. In the Turkish navy a commodore is not a rank but a position (usually group commander). Commodores almost always have the rank of Captain (Albay), but can fly their special pennants and wear special ribbons.

- Tuğamiral (Rear Admiral/Lower Half) is the lowest admiral's rank. Their shoulderboards are covered in gold lace, and have a silver garland with swords crossed in the middle (General's mark) and a silver five pointed star above that. All admirals also wear two rows of leaves on their caps.
- Tümamiral (Rear Admiral/Upper Half) wears the same shoulderboards as Tuğamirals, but with two silver stars.
- Koramiral (Vice Admiral): There are usually six Koramirals in the whole navy. Koramirals wear three silver stars on the usual shoulder boards.
- Oramiral (Admiral): There are two oramirals, one of them is the Commander of the Naval Forces (Deniz Kuvvetleri Komutanı ), while the other is Commander of the Turkish Fleet (Donanma Komutanı). Oramiralwear shoulder boards with four silver stars, and three normal stripes (the top one with the curl) above the broad stripe.
- Genelkurmay Başkanı (Chief of the Turkish General Staff) assumes command of the Turkish Armed Forces, and although he is commonly appointed from the Turkish Army, he is entitled to wear all uniforms in the Turkish Armed Forces, including the Navy's. When he wears the Navy's uniform, he wears the oramiral's shoulder boards with specially embroidered lace as the base, and he wears the oramiral's sleeve stripes with the broad stripe also embroidered and decorated with leaves.
- Büyük Amiral (Admiral of the Fleet): This is a wartime-only rank and has never been awarded to any member of the Turkish Navy. Its army equivalent, Mareşal (Field Marshal), has had only two bearers in the republic's history: Marshal Fevzi Çakmak and Mustafa Kemal Atatürk himself. A Büyük Amiral would wear shoulder boards with special gold handwork on red velvet, decorated with golden leaves, and with a general's garland on top of that.

==== Rank pennants and flags (ensigns) ====
Pennants are only flown for officers who assume command of an independent unit. Staff officers who work in headquarters do not fly pennants.

- Flandra (Masthead Pennant): The Flandra is flown when the ship's commanding officer boards the ship. It is quite like a very long red stripe with a crescent moon and star close to the mast.
- Group Commander: For group commanders, a red triangular pennant with one bomb (twenty pointed white star) is flown.
- Regiment Commanders: For regiment commanders, a square red flag with an anchor in the middle is flown.
- Commodores: A swallow-tailed red pennant with two bombs (one on the upper left corner, the other one below that) is flown.
Rear Admiral (Lower half)

Rear Admiral (Upper half)

Vice Admiral

Admiral

Commander of the Naval Forces

Admiral of the Fleet

=== Other ranks ===
| NATO code | OR-9 | OR-8 | OR-7 | OR-6 | OR-5 | | | OR-4 | | OR-3 | | OR-2 | OR-1 |
|---|---|---|---|---|---|---|---|---|---|---|---|---|---|
| Turkish Naval Forces | | | | | | | | | | | | | No insignia |
| Turkish Naval Forces | Astsubay kıdemli başçavuş | Astsubay başçavuş | Astsubay kıdemli üstçavuş | Astsubay üstçavuş | Astsubay kıdemli çavuş | Astsubay çavuş | Astsubay astçavuş | Uzman çavuş | Çavuş | Uzman onbaşı | Onbaşı | | Er |
| U.S. equivalent | Master chief petty officer | Senior chief petty officer | Chief petty officer | | Petty officer first class | | | Petty officer second class | | Petty officer third class | | | Seaman recruit |

==== Rates (insignia of category) ====
There are several major categories in the Navy for different professions. Insignia of category are worn right above the circle in the topmost stripe, both on the sleeve and the shoulder board. It is a small round patch with gold-coloured needlework. Line officers and admirals do not wear these patches. (Admirals with special circumstances (doctors and engineers) may wear them on their sleeves, but not shoulders)

- Naval Infantry (Marines): In the Turkish armed forces, marines are subordinates to the navy and wear the Navy's uniforms. Their patch consists of an anchor and two rifles crossing it.
- Combat Engineer (Civil Engineer): A combat engineer wears a patch with the portrayal of what seems to be a fortress, beyond the sea.
- Supply: Supply officers wear a branch with three gold-coloured leaves.
- Hydrography/Oceanography: These officers wear a patch which portrays a lighthouse, with two beams of light heading away from each other.
- Medical Corps (Medical Doctors): Doctors bear the Staff of Asclepius, a staff with a single snake entangled around it.
- Pharmacists: Pharmacists wear the image of a cup, with a snake around it and a branch surrounding both.
- Dentists: Dentists wear a staff with a branch around it.
- Engineers: An engineer wears the image of a protractor and a pair of compasses beneath that.
- Prosecutors/Judges: Officers of this category wear a patch that includes a book laying open and a pair of scales behind that.
- Legal: Officers Officers of this category wear a patch that includes a book laying open and a pair of "H" above it.
- Instructors: Instructors wear a patch with a book laying open with a torch behind.
- Band Musician: A band musician wears a patch with a musical harp.
- Nurse: Officers from the Nurses' Corps wear a single golden crescent with the corners pointed upwards.
- Intelligence: The Intelligence patch consists of a golden circle with a cross in between; embroidered with arrows at each point the cross cuts the circle. Portrayed as if this Wheel was turning around its own axis.
- Staff Officers: Staff officers, are the officers who assume command or important positions in other headquarters, with a specialty in military personnel and supplies management. They wear a single golden five-point star as their patch of category.

== Gendarmerie General Command ==
Officer ranks

| NATO code | OF-10 | OF-9 | OF-8 | OF-7 | OF-6 | OF-5 | OF-4 | OF-3 | OF-2 | OF-1 |
|---|---|---|---|---|---|---|---|---|---|---|---|---|
| Turkish Gendarmerie |
| Turkish Gendarmerie | | Orgeneral | Korgeneral | Tümgeneral | Tuğgeneral | Albay | Yarbay | Binbaşı | Yüzbaşı | Üsteğmen | Teğmen | Asteğmen |

Other ranks

| NATO code | OR-9 | OR-8 | OR-7 | OR-6 | OR-5 | | OR-4 | | | OR-3 | OR-2 | OR-1 |
|---|---|---|---|---|---|---|---|---|---|---|---|---|
| Turkish Gendarmerie |
| Turkish Gendarmerie | Astsubay kıdemli başçavuş | Astsubay başçavuş | Astsubay kıdemli üstçavuş | Astsubay üstçavuş | Astsubay kıdemli çavuş | Astsubay çavuş | Uzman Jandarma Kademeli Çavuş | I. Kıdemli Uzman Çavuş | Uzman Çavuş | Uzman onbaşı |

=== Uzman Jandarma ===
In 1988 the 3466 Uzman Jandarma Kanunu (Law No. 3466 on Specialized Gendarmerie) was passed, which established the rank category of Uzman Jandarma. Uzman Jandarma attend the Uzman Jandarma Okulu (Specialist Gendarmerie School) for 1 year of training, covering military and legal topics. Attendees are selected from those who have completed their 6-month conscription and who can pass a written entrance exam. Uzman Jandarma who complete training are then required to serve for 15 years.

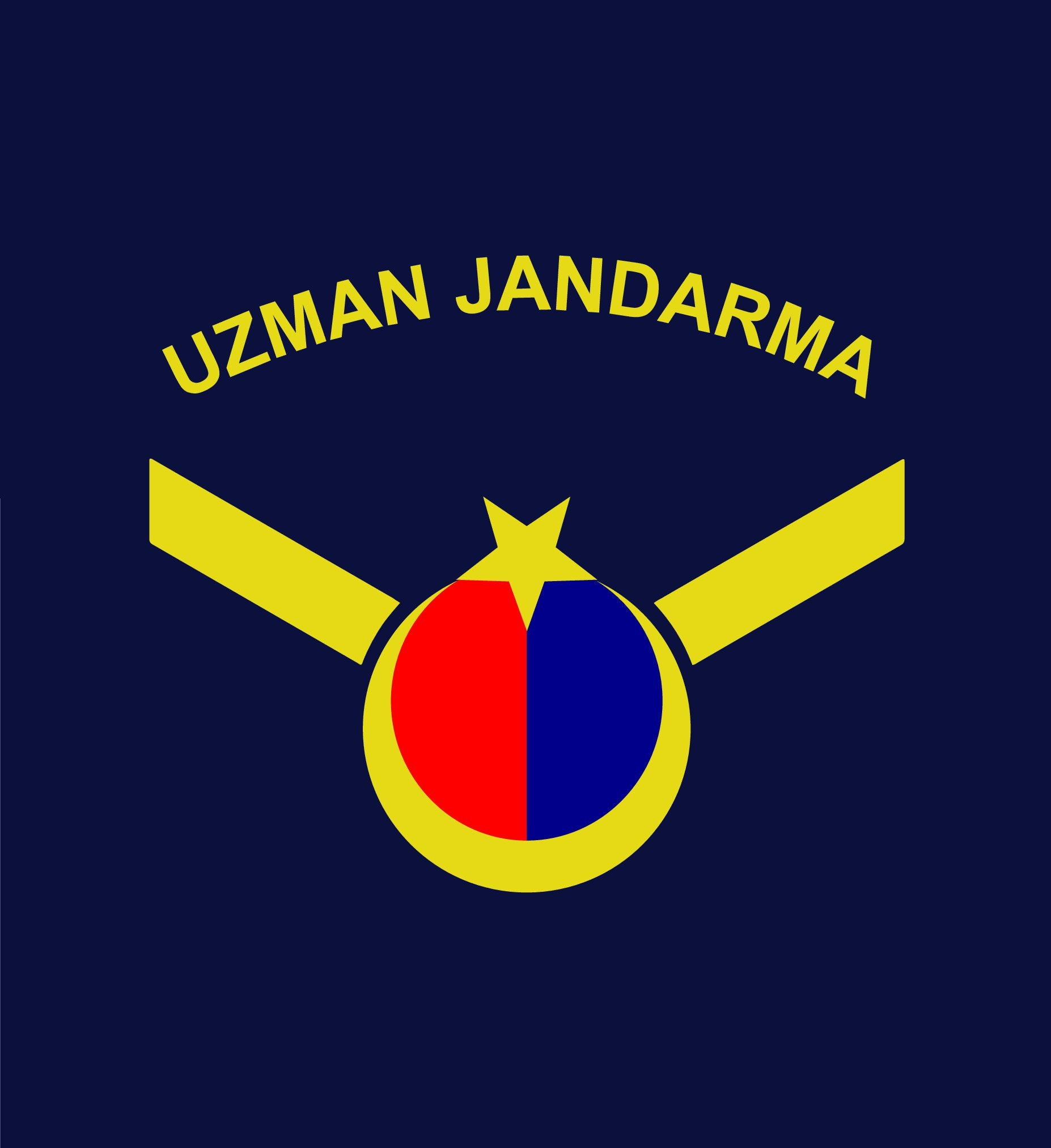
| NATO code | OR-4 | | | | | | | | | Candidate |
|---|---|---|---|---|---|---|---|---|---|---|
| Turkish Gendarmerie |
| Turkish Gendarmerie | Uzman Jandarma VIII Kademeli Çavuş | Uzman Jandarma VII Kademeli Çavuş | Uzman Jandarma VI Kademeli Çavuş | Uzman Jandarma V Kademeli Çavuş | Uzman Jandarma IV Kademeli Çavuş | Uzman Jandarma III Kademeli Çavuş | Uzman Jandarma II Kademeli Çavuş | Uzman Jandarma I Kademeli Çavuş | Uzman Jandarma Çavuş | Uzman Jandarma Adayı |

The Uzman Jandarma Okulu was closed in 2012, and as a result no new Uzman Jandarma would be trained, with those in the rank class retaining their rank until they retire.

| Year | Number of Uzman Jandarma |
|---|---|
| 2011 | 24,700 |
| 2012 | 24,176 |
| 2013 | 24,292 |
| 2014 | 23,380 |
| 2015 | 22,394 |
| 2016 | 21,917 |
| 2017 | 18,526 |
| 2018 | 17,711 |
| 2019 | 16,847 |
| 2020 | 15,390 |
| 2021 | 14,450 |
| 2022 | 13,815 |
| 2023 | 12,555 |
| 2024 | 11,646 |

=== Uzman Çavuş ===
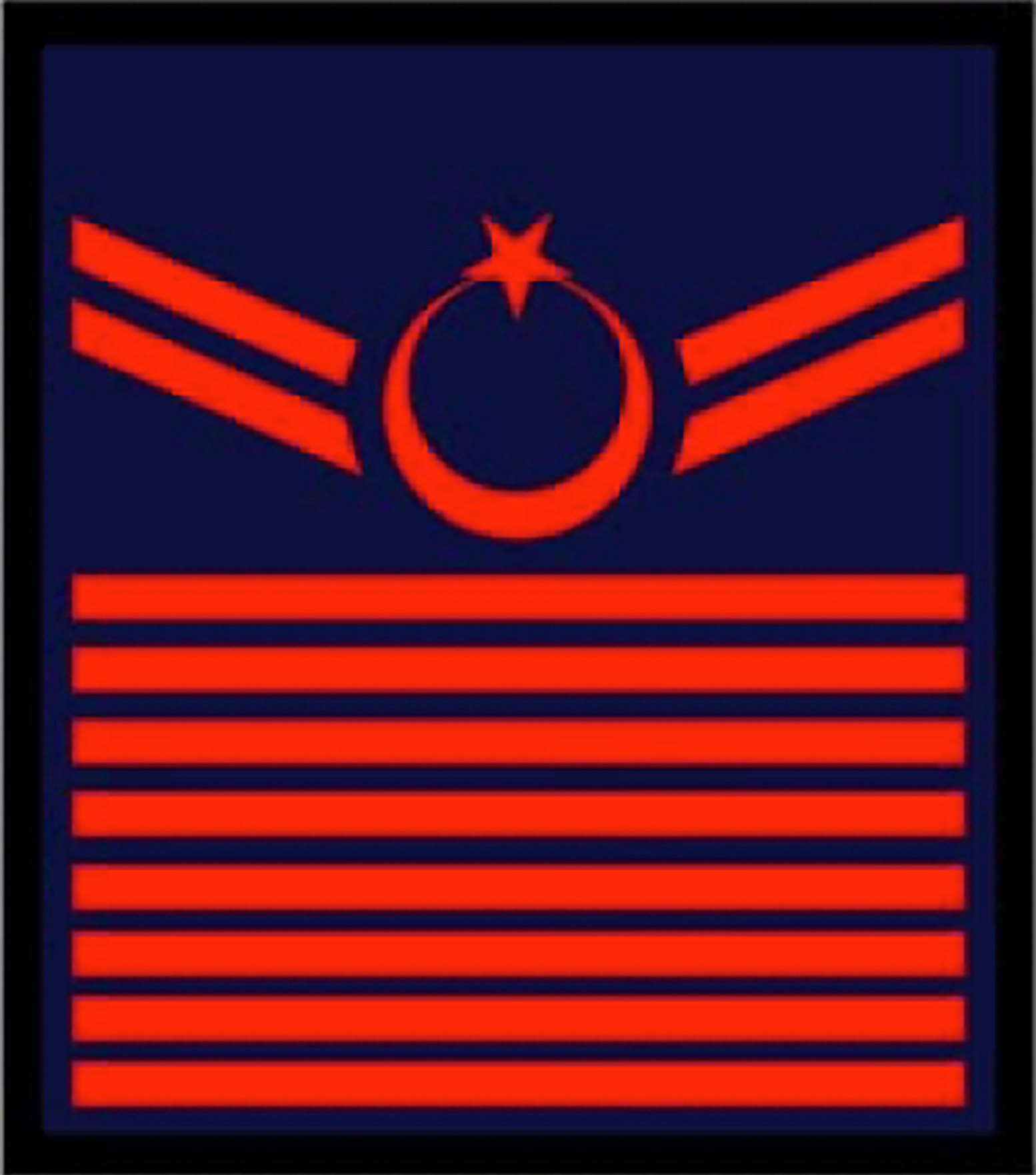
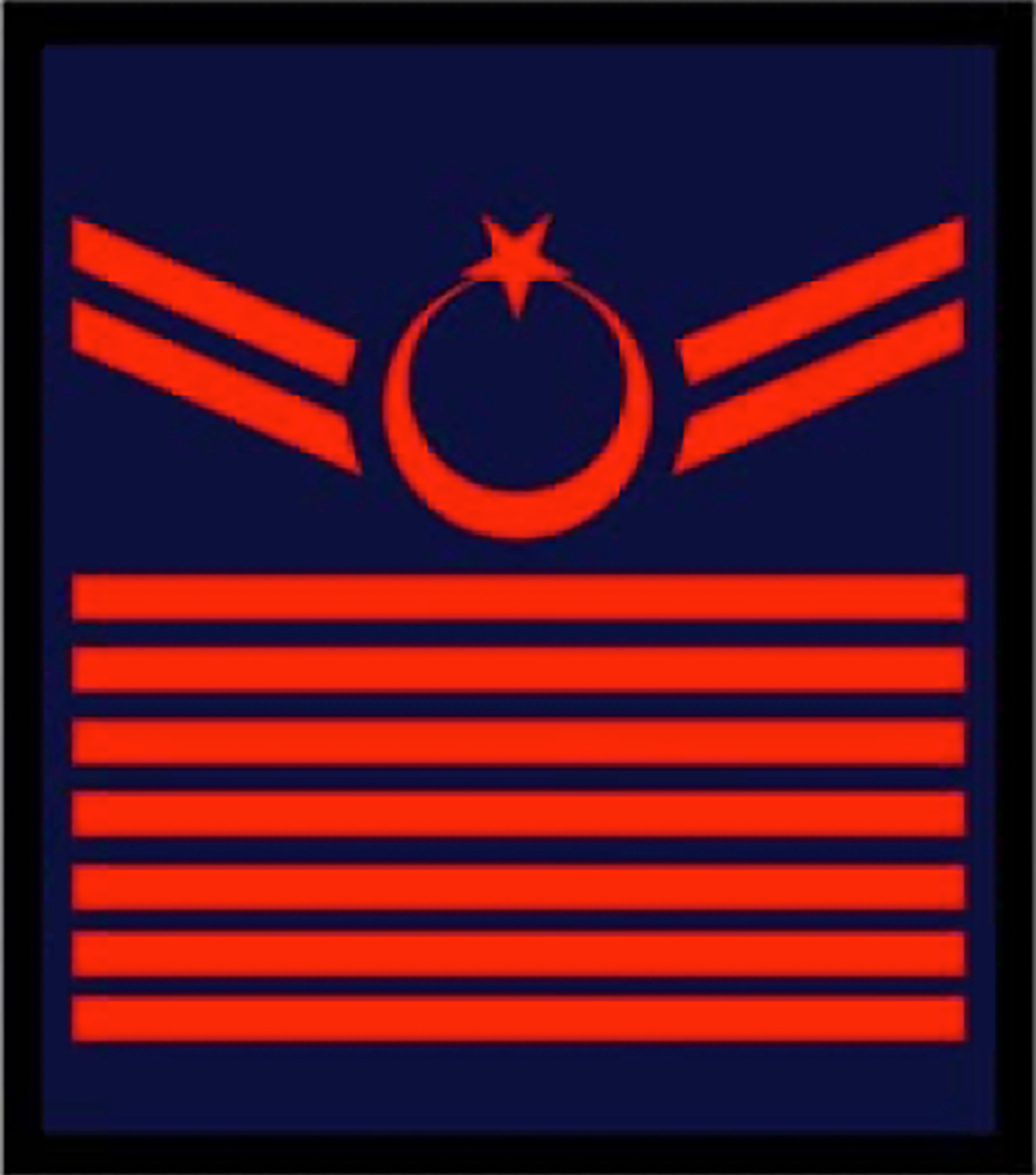
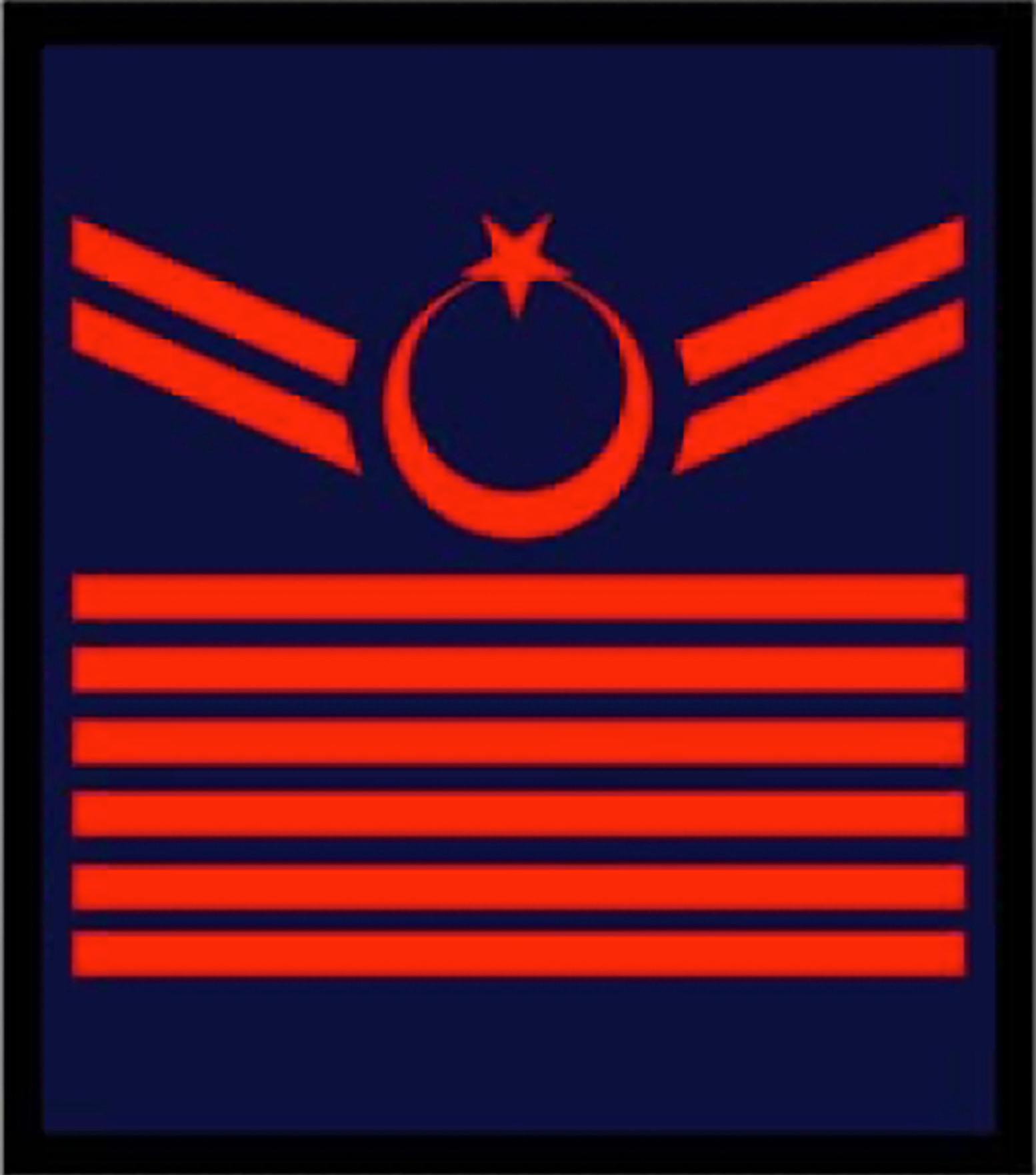
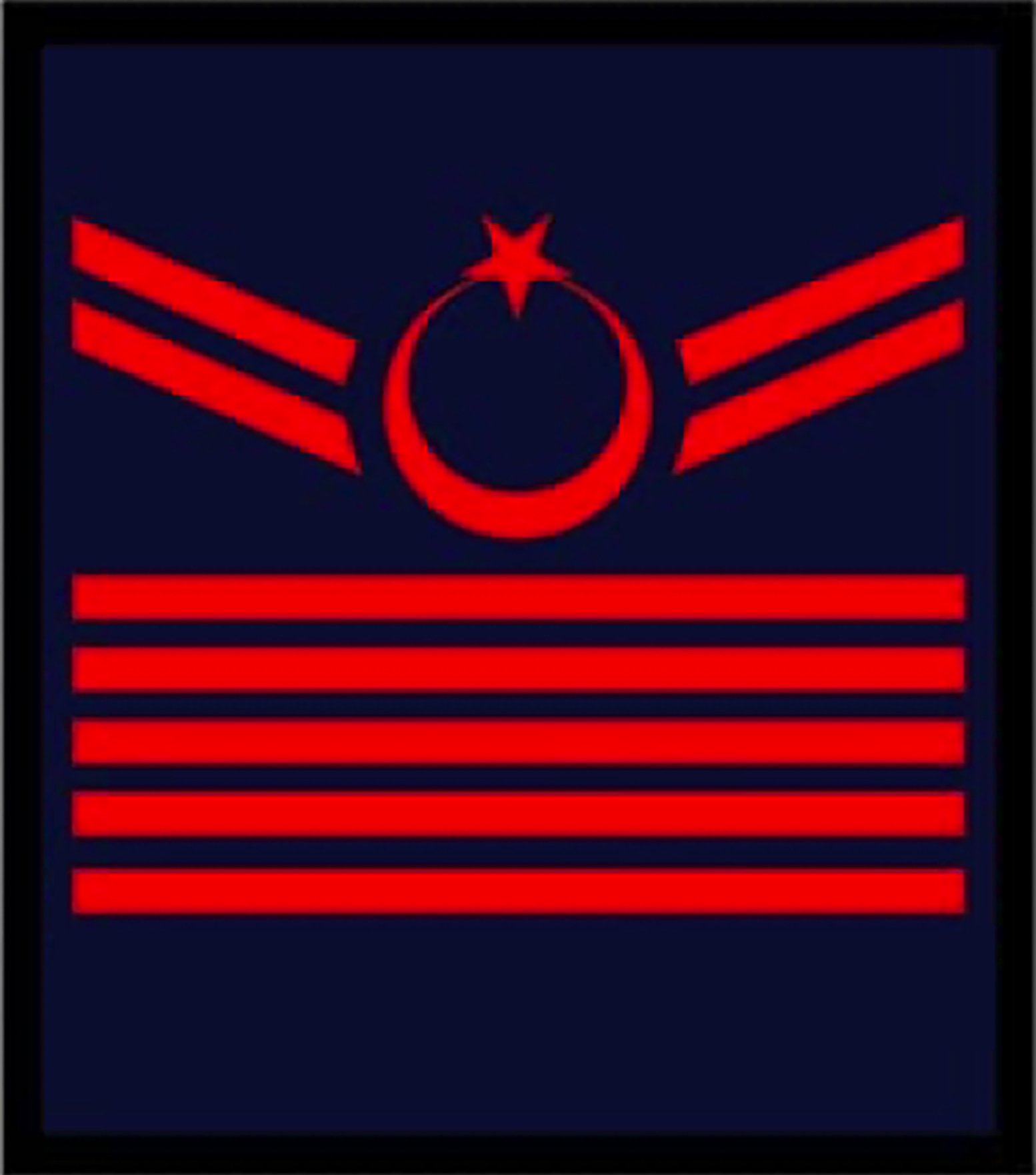
| NATO code | OR-4 |
|---|---|---|---|---|---|---|---|---|---|
| Turkish Gendarmerie |
| Turkish Gendarmerie | VIII. Kıdemli Uzman Çavuş | VII. Kıdemli Uzman Çavuş | VI. Kıdemli Uzman Çavuş | V. Kıdemli Uzman Çavuş | IV. Kıdemli Uzman Çavuş | III. Kıdemli Uzman Çavuş | II. Kıdemli Uzman Çavuş | I. Kıdemli Uzman Çavuş | Uzman Çavuş |

== Coast Guard ==
Officers

| NATO code | OF-10 | OF-9 | OF-8 | OF-7 | OF-6 | OF-5 | OF-4 | OF-3 | OF-2 | OF-1 |
|---|---|---|---|---|---|---|---|---|---|---|---|
| Turkish Coast; Guard Command |
| Turkish Coast; Guard Command | | | Koramiral | Tümamiral | Tuğamiral | Albay | Yarbay | Binbaşı | Yüzbaşı | Üsteğmen | Teğmen |

Enlisted

| NATO code | OR-9 | OR-8 | OR-7 | OR-6 | OR-5 | | OR-4 | | | OR-3 | OR-2 | OR-1 |
|---|---|---|---|---|---|---|---|---|---|---|---|---|
| Turkish Coast; Guard Command | | | | | | | Kıdemli uzman çavuş 2 / Kıdemli uzman çavuş 1 | | Kıdemli uzman onbaşı 2 / Kıdemli uzman onbaşı 1 | | | No insignia |
| Turkish Coast; Guard Command | Astsubay kıdemli başçavuş | Astsubay başçavuş | Astsubay kıdemli üstçavuş | Astsubay üstçavuş | Astsubay kıdemli çavuş | Astsubay çavuş | Kıdemli uzman çavuş 2 / Kıdemli uzman çavuş 1 | Uzman çavuş | Kıdemli uzman onbaşı 2 / Kıdemli uzman onbaşı 1 | Uzman onbaşı | | Er |

The coast guards wear the same rank and rate insignia as ordinary navy officers but with an orange thin arc-shaped stripe, with the words "Sahil Güvenlik" (Coast Guards) embroidered in black, worn on their upper right arm, close to the shoulder. Also, special pennants are flown for the senior officers of the Coast Guard.

- Commander of the Coast Guard : For the Commander of the Coast Guard, a square orange coloured flag with a black stripe running diagonally across the left side of the flag, also bearing three bombs is flown.
- Coast Guard Commander (Rank of Captain) : For these officers, a swallow tailed pennant with a horizontal black stripe across the flag, dividing it in two, also bearing a bomb on each side of the stripe, is flown.
- Coast Guard School Commander : The Coast Guard School Commander has a square orange flag, with a white anchor in the center and a vertical black stripe just near the mast.
- Coast Guard Group Commander : The Group Commander has a triangular orange pennant, with a black anchor in the middle.

== Historic ranks ==
=== Turkish Land Forces and Turkish Air Force Officers ===
The rank insignia of commissioned officers.

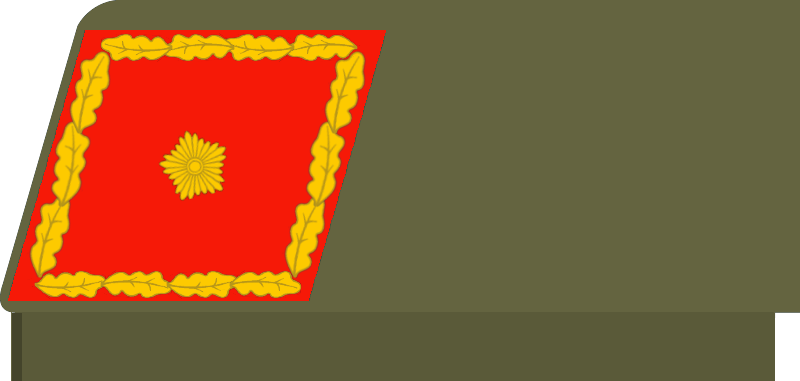
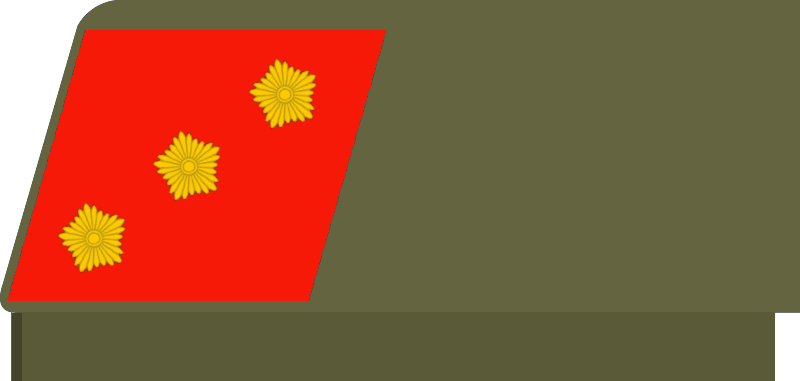
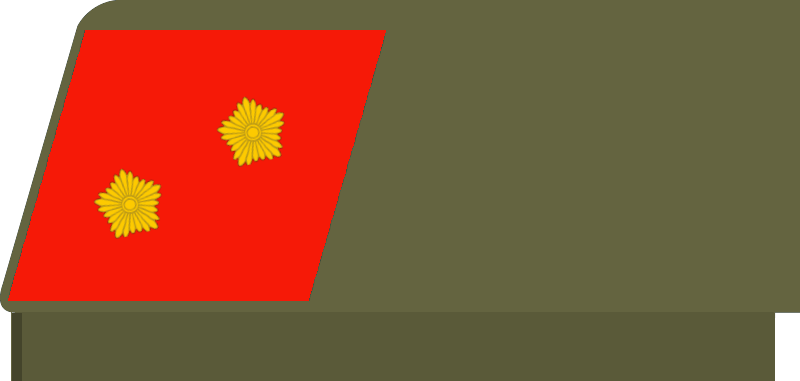
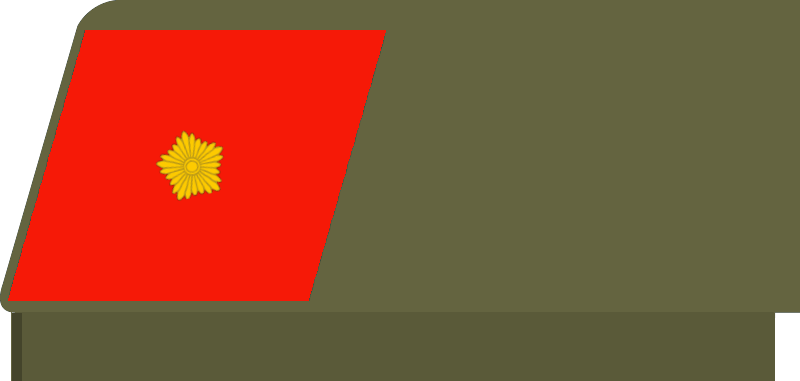
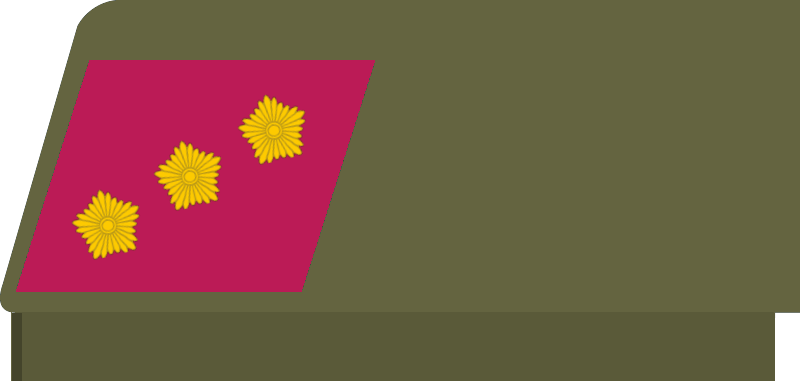
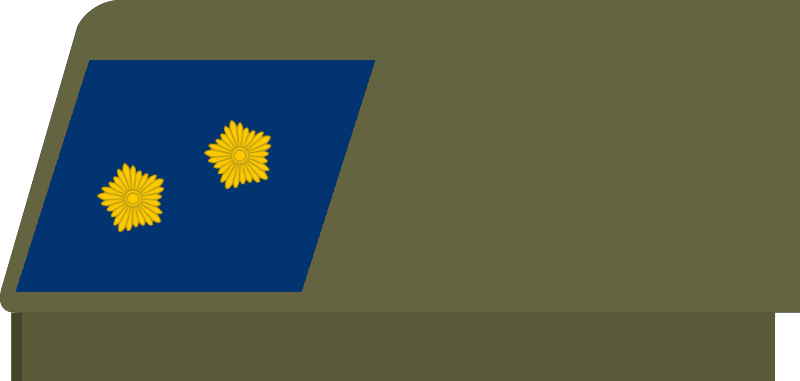
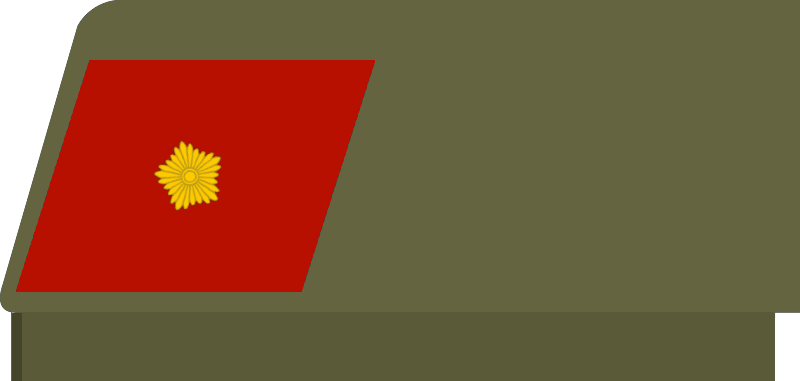
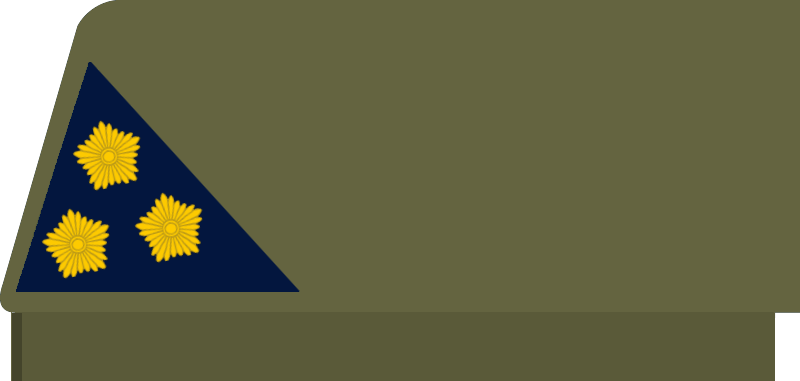
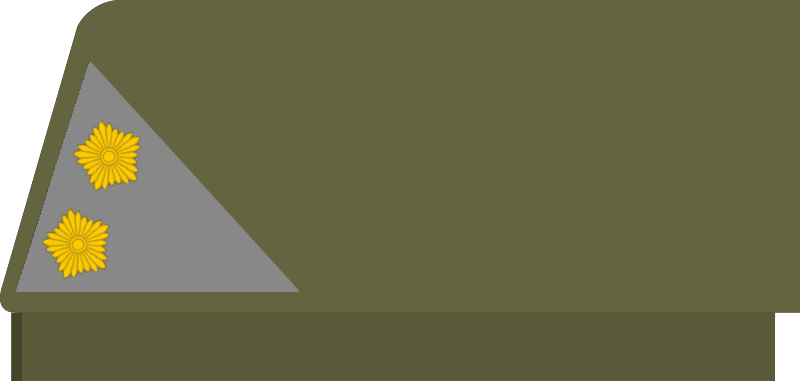
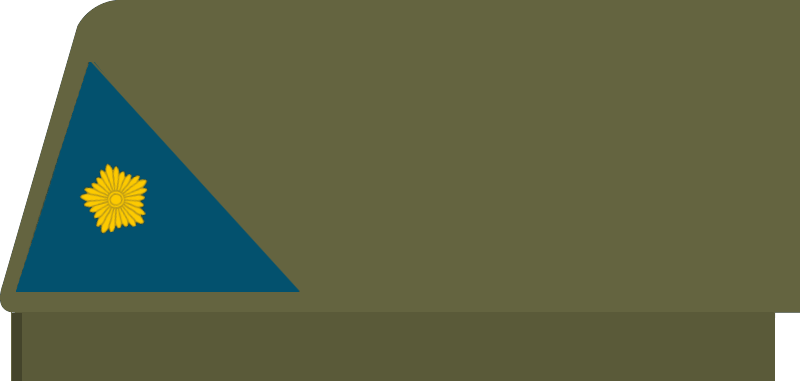
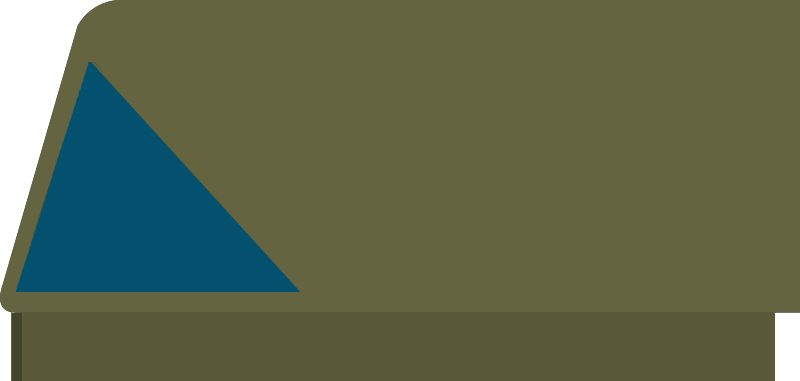
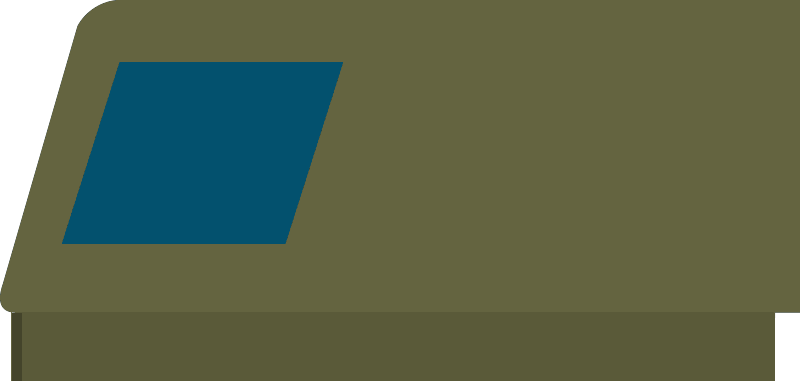
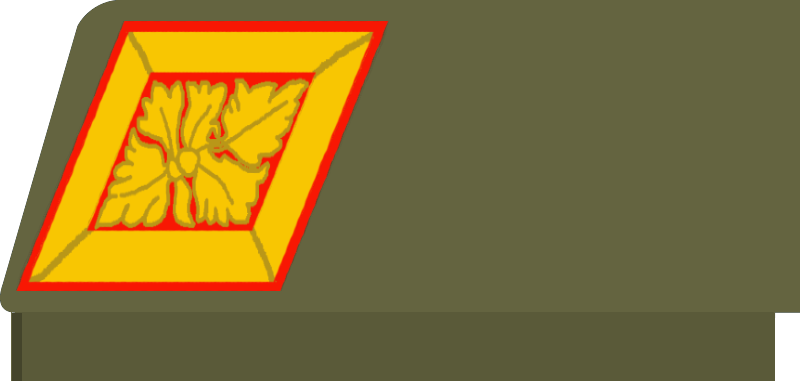
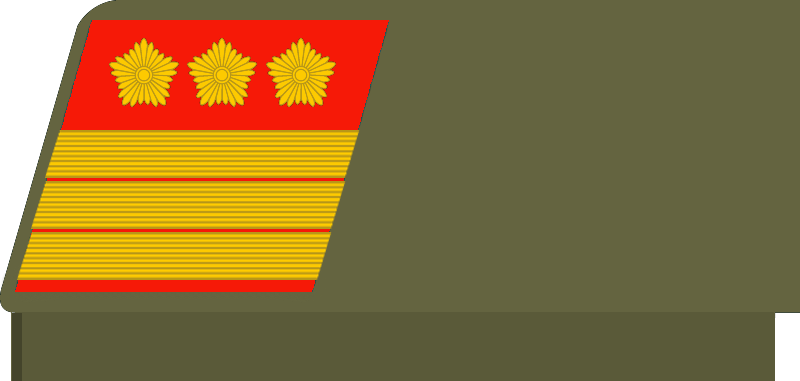
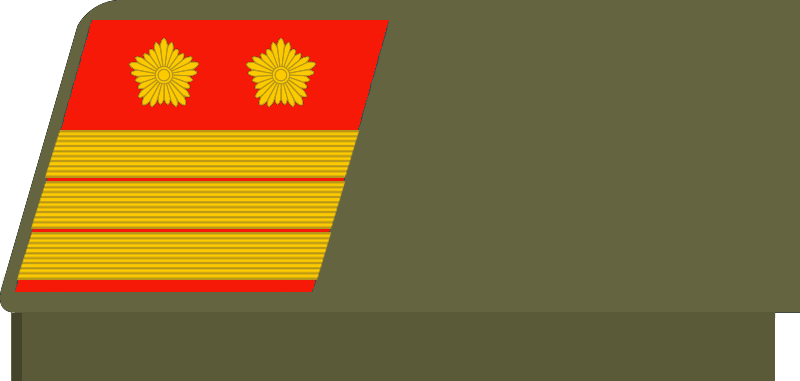
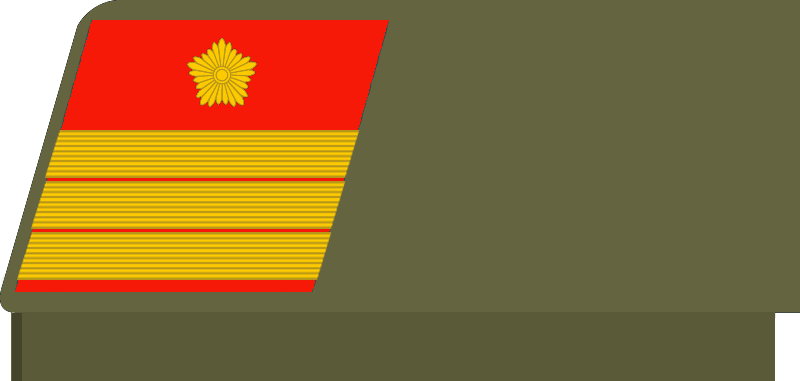
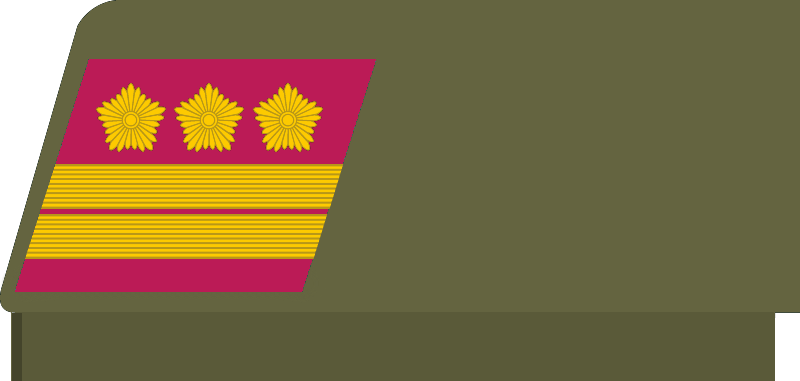
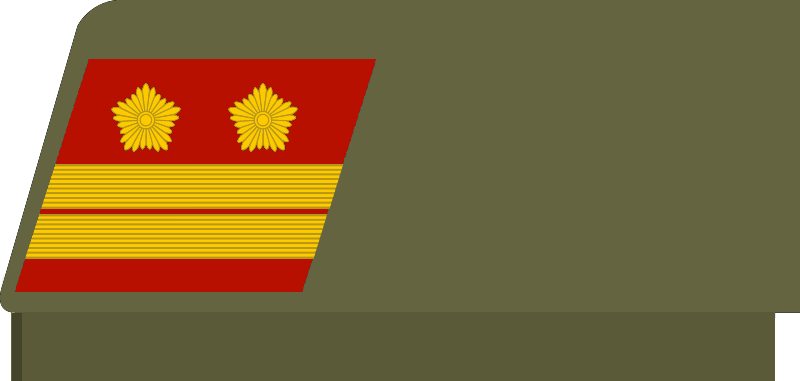
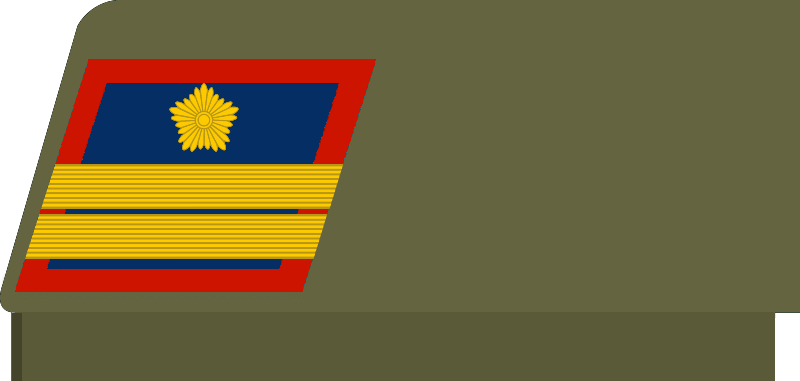
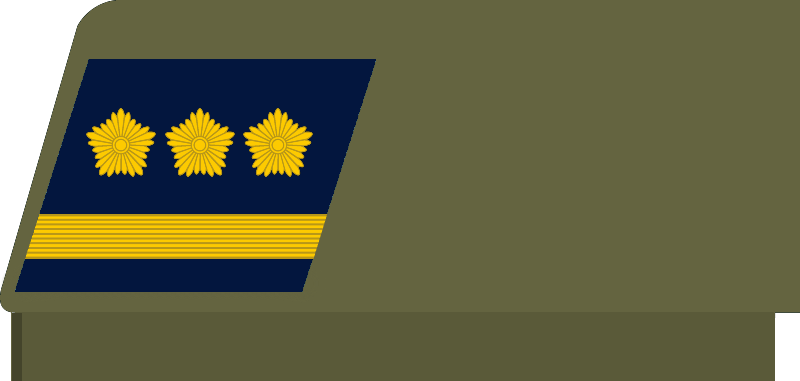
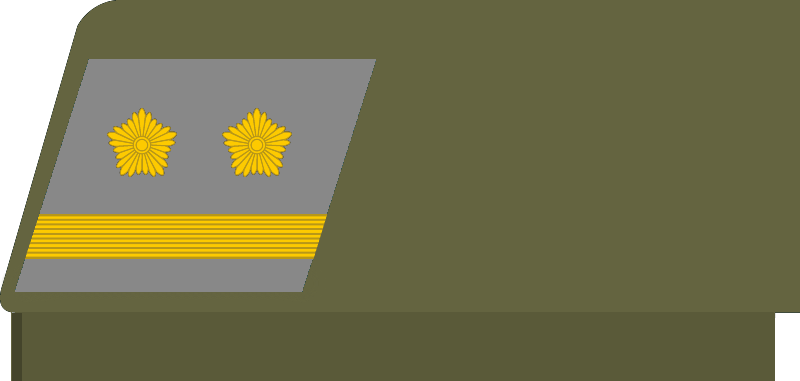
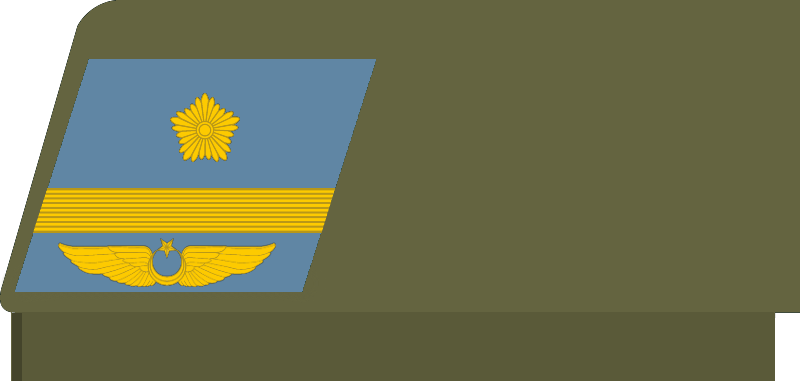
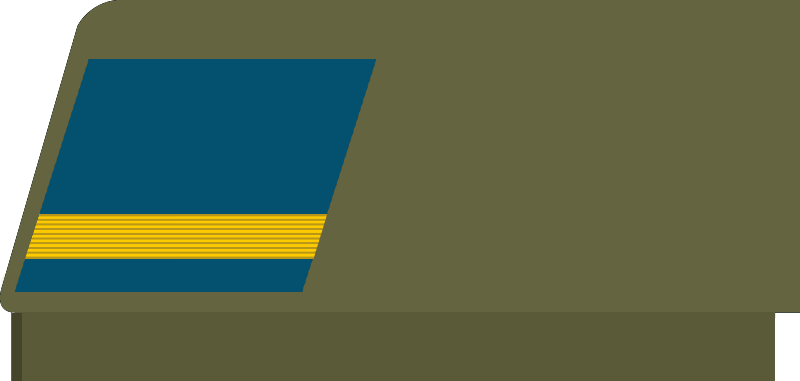
| Rank group | General / flag officers | | | | | Senior officers | | | Junior officers |
|---|---|---|---|---|---|---|---|---|---|---|---|---|---|
| (Turkey) Turkish Land & Air Forces (1920–1924) |
| (Turkey) Turkish Land & Air Forces (1920–1924) | مشیر; Müşîr | فريق اول; Ferîk-i evvel | | فريق; Ferîk | ميرلوا; Mirliva | ميرآلاى; Miralay (General staff) | قائم مقام; Kaymakam (Combat engineer) | بينباشى; Binbaşı (Medical) | يوزباشى; Yüzbaşı (Artillery) | ملازم اول; Mülâzım-ı evvel (Cavalry) | ملازم ثانى; Mülâzım-ı sânî (Infantry) | ضابط وكيلی; Zabit vekili (Note: Given to students of the temporary military academy established in Ankara who have been sent to the frontline as platoon commanders.) (Infantry) | ضابط نامزدى; Zabit namzedi (Note: Given to the students of the Kuleli Military High School who have made their way to the temporary military academy in Ankara and was deemed competent enough to be sent to the frontline as platoon commanders.) (Infantry) |
| (Turkey) Turkish Land & Air Forces (1924–1933) | (Note: Insignia kept as the collar tab of the Müşîr and Mareşal ranks until 1947.) |
| (Turkey) Turkish Land & Air Forces (1924–1933) | مشیر; Müşîr | فريق اول; Ferîk-i evvel | | فريق; Ferîk | ميرلوا; Mirliva | ميرآلاى; Miralay (General staff) | قائم مقام; Kaymakam (Medical) | بينباشى; Binbaşı (Gendarmerie) | يوزباشى; Yüzbaşı (Artillery) | ملازم اول; Mülâzım-ı evvel (Cavalry) | ملازم ثانى; Mülâzım-ı sânî (Aviation) | ضابط وكيلی; Zabit vekili (Infantry) |
| (Turkey) Turkish Land & Air Forces (1933–1935) |
| (Turkey) Turkish Land & Air Forces (1933–1935) | Müşîr | Birinci ferîk | | Ferîk | Mirliva | Miralay | Kaymakam | Binbaşı | Yüzbaşı | Birinci mülâzım | Mülâzım | Zabit vekili |
| (Turkey) Turkish Land & Air Forces (1935–1938) |
| (Turkey) Turkish Land & Air Forces (1935–1938) | Mareşal | Orgeneral | Korgeneral | Tümgeneral | Tuğgeneral | Albay | Yarbay | Binbaşı | Yüzbaşı | Teğmen | Asteğmen | Yarsubay |
| (Turkey) Turkish Land & Air Forces (1938–1947) |
| (Turkey) Turkish Land & Air Forces (1938–1947) | Mareşal | Orgeneral | Korgeneral | Tümgeneral | Tuğgeneral | Albay | Yarbay | Binbaşı | Yüzbaşı | Üsteğmen | Teğmen | Asteğmen |
| (Turkey) Turkish Land & Air Forces (1947–1956) |
| (Turkey) Turkish Land & Air Forces (1947–1956) | Mareşal | Orgeneral | Korgeneral | Tümgeneral | Tuğgeneral | Albay | Yarbay | Binbaşı | Yüzbaşı | Üsteğmen | Teğmen | Asteğmen |
| (Turkey) Turkish Land & Air Forces (1956–1964) |
| (Turkey) Turkish Land & Air Forces (1956–1964) | Mareşal | Orgeneral | Korgeneral | Tümgeneral | Tuğgeneral | Albay | Yarbay | Binbaşı | Yüzbaşı | Üsteğmen | Teğmen | Asteğmen |

=== Turkish Land Forces and Turkish Air Force Other ranks ===
The rank insignia of non-commissioned officers and enlisted personnel.

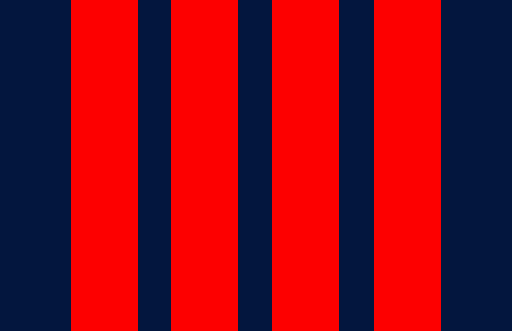
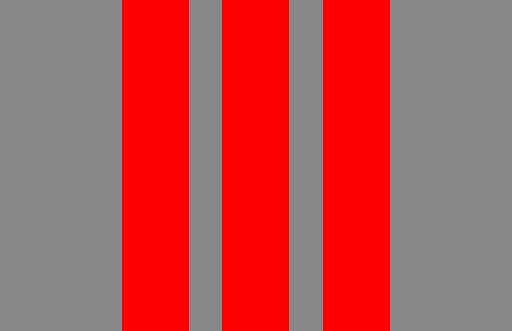
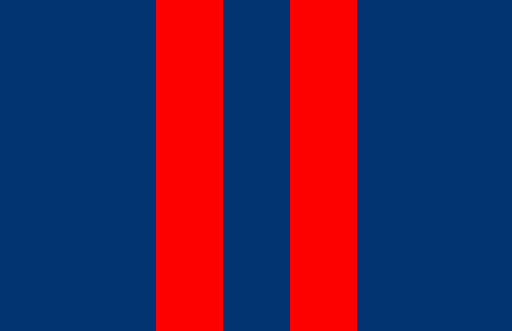
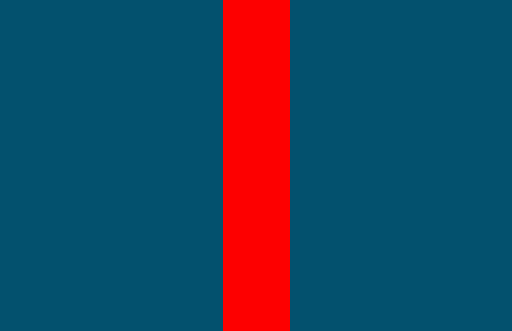
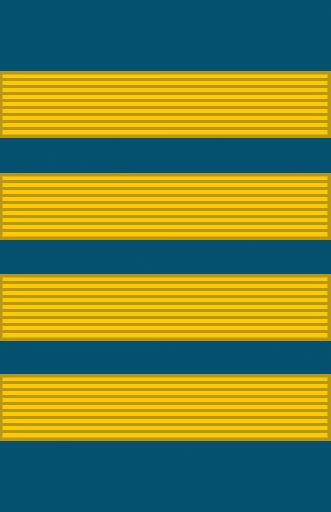
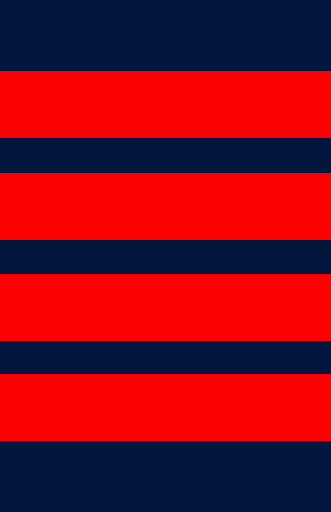
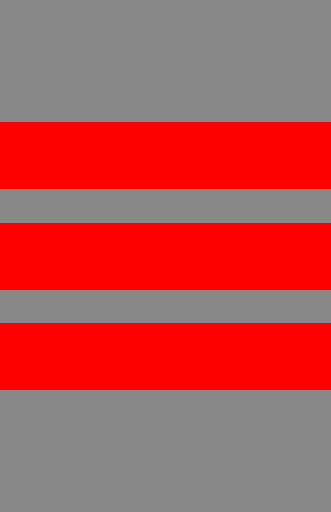
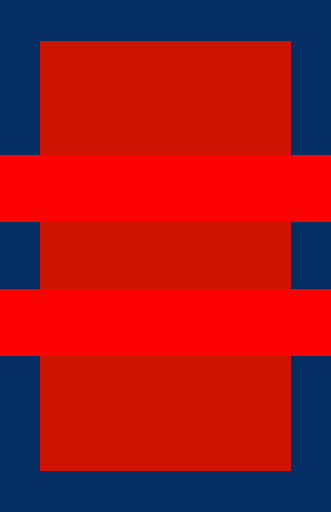
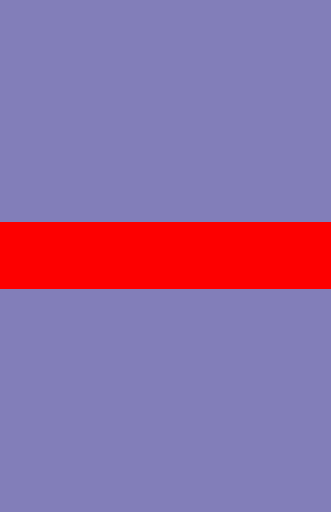
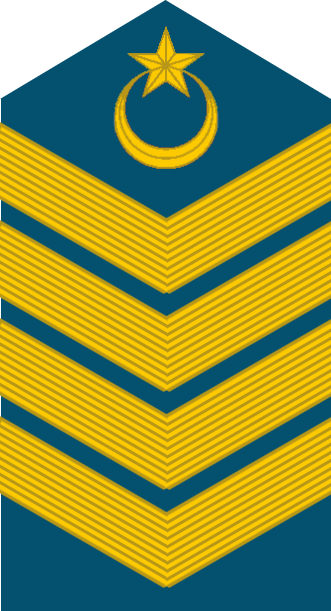
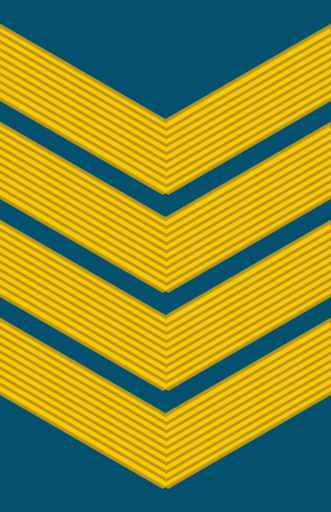
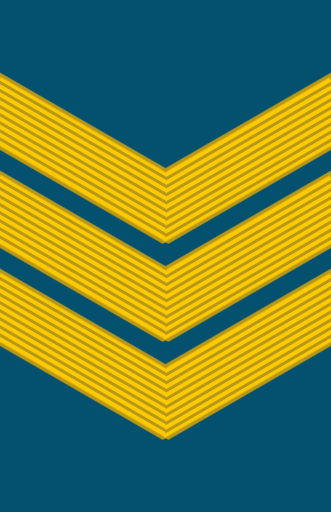
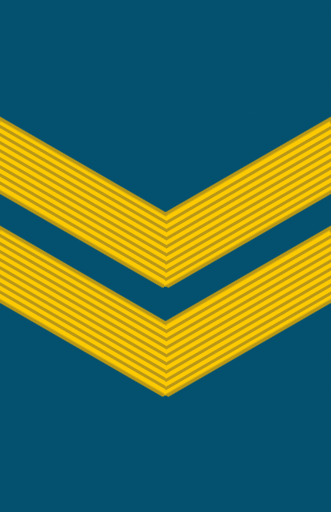
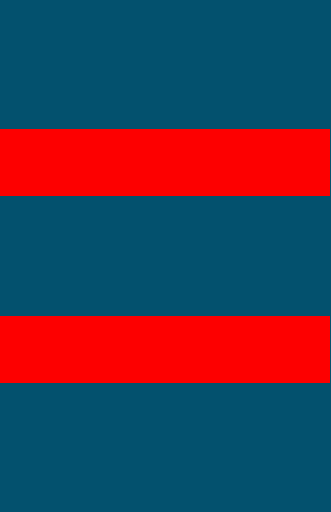
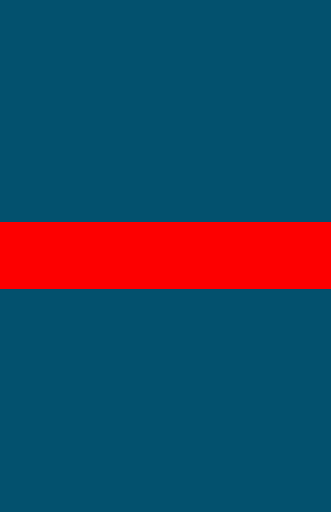
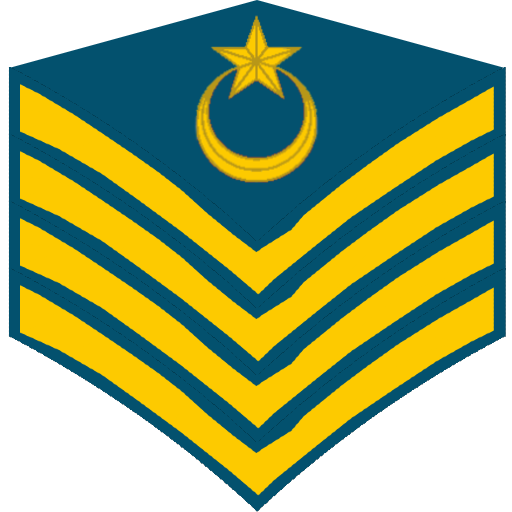
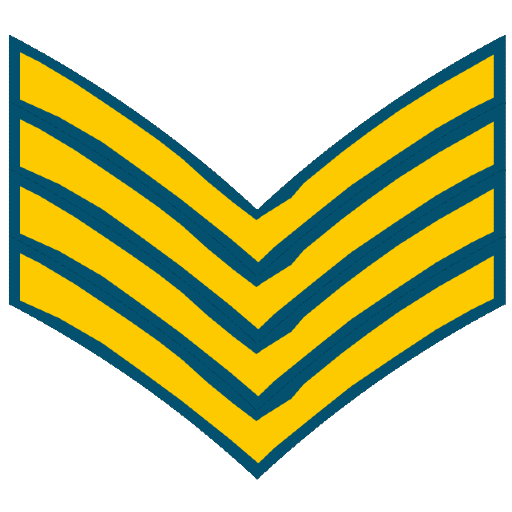
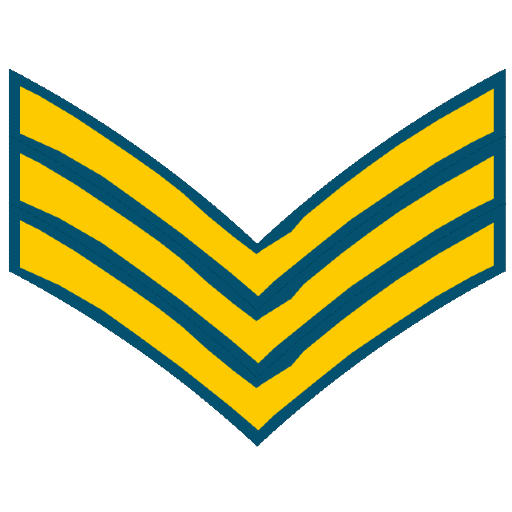
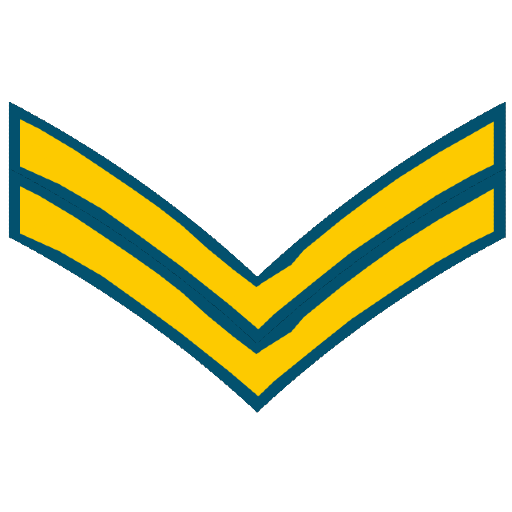
| Rank group | Non-commissioned officer | | | | | Enlisted |
|---|---|---|---|---|---|---|---|
| (Turkey) Turkish Land & Air Forces (1920–1924) (Note: Only worn on the left sleeve.) | | | | | | | No insignia |
| (Turkey) Turkish Land & Air Forces (1920–1924) | ㅤ | باش چاووش; Başçavuş (Artillery) | باش چاووش معاونی; Başçavuş muavini (Cavalry) | چاووش; Çavuş (Combat engineer) | ㅤ | اون باشی; Onbaşı (Infantry) | نفر; Nefer |
| (Turkey) Turkish Land & Air Forces (1924–1933) | | | | | | | No insignia |
| (Turkey) Turkish Land & Air Forces (1924–1933) | تاکم باشی; Takımbaşı (Infantry) | باش چاووش; Başçavuş (Artillery) | باش چاووش معینی; Başçavuş muavini (Cavalry) | چاووش; Çavuş (Gendarmerie) | ㅤ | اون باشی; Onbaşı (Quartermaster) | نفر; Nefer |
| (Turkey) Turkish Land & Air Forces (1933–1947) | | | | | | | No insignia |
| (Turkey) Turkish Land & Air Forces (1933–1947) | Başgedikli (Infantry) | Gedikli başçavuş (Infantry) | Gedikli üstçavuş (Note: Gedikli başçavuş muavini until 1935.) (Infantry) | Gedikli çavuş (Infantry) | Çavuş (Infantry) | Onbaşı (Infantry) | Er (Note: Nefer until 1935.) |
| (Turkey) Turkish Land & Air Forces (1947–1953) | | | | | | | No insignia |
| (Turkey) Turkish Land & Air Forces (1947–1953) | Astsubay kıdemli başçavuş (Note: Başgedikli until 1951.) | Astsubay başçavuş (Note: Gedikli başçavuş until 1951.) | Astsubay üstçavuş (Note: Gedikli üstçavuş until 1951.) | Astsubay çavuş (Note: Gedikli çavuş until 1951.) | Çavuş | Onbaşı | Er |
| (Turkey) Turkish Land & Air Forces (1953–1956) | | | | | | | No insignia |
| (Turkey) Turkish Land & Air Forces (1953–1956) | Astsubay kıdemli başçavuş | Astsubay başçavuş | Astsubay üstçavuş | Astsubay çavuş | Çavuş | Onbaşı | Er |
| (Turkey) Turkish Land & Air Forces (1956–1970) | | | | | | | No insignia |
| (Turkey) Turkish Land & Air Forces (1956–1970) | Astsubay kıdemli başçavuş | Astsubay başçavuş | Astsubay üstçavuş | Astsubay çavuş | Çavuş | Onbaşı | Er |

=== Turkish Naval Forces Officers ===
The rank insignia of commissioned officers.

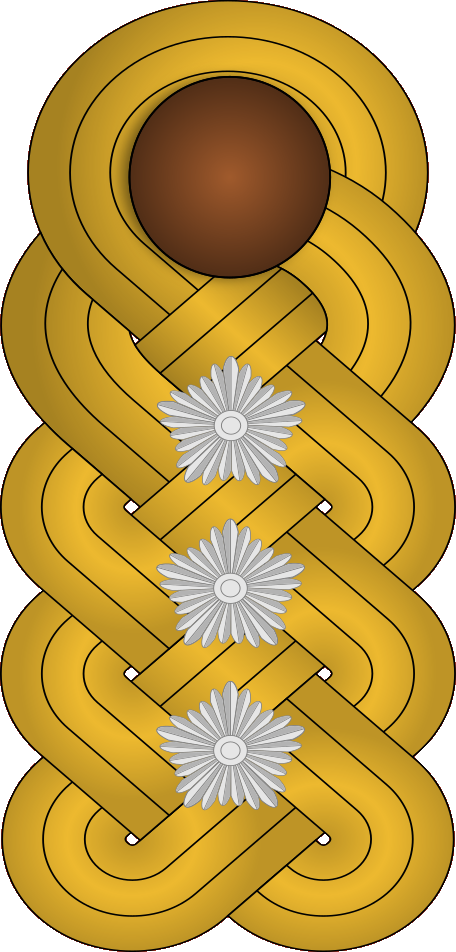
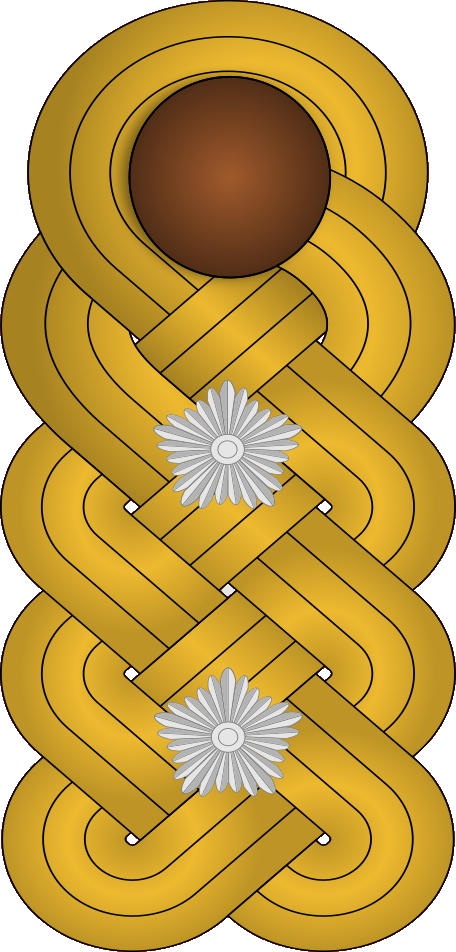
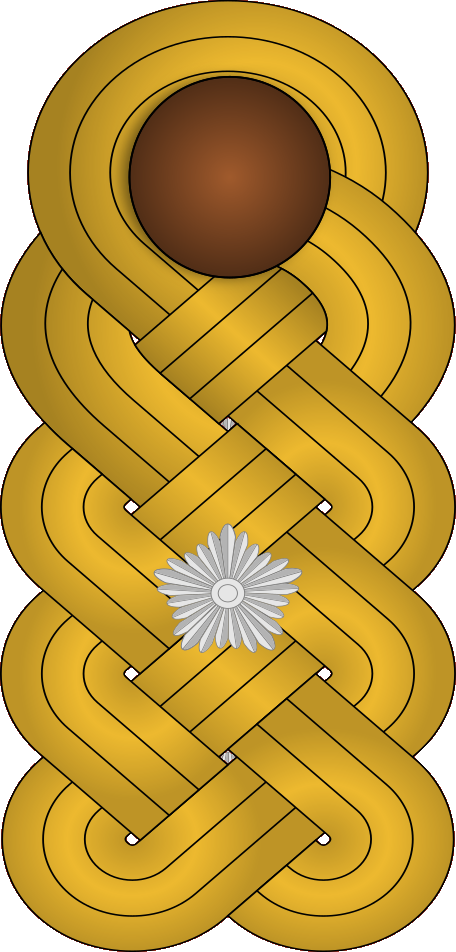
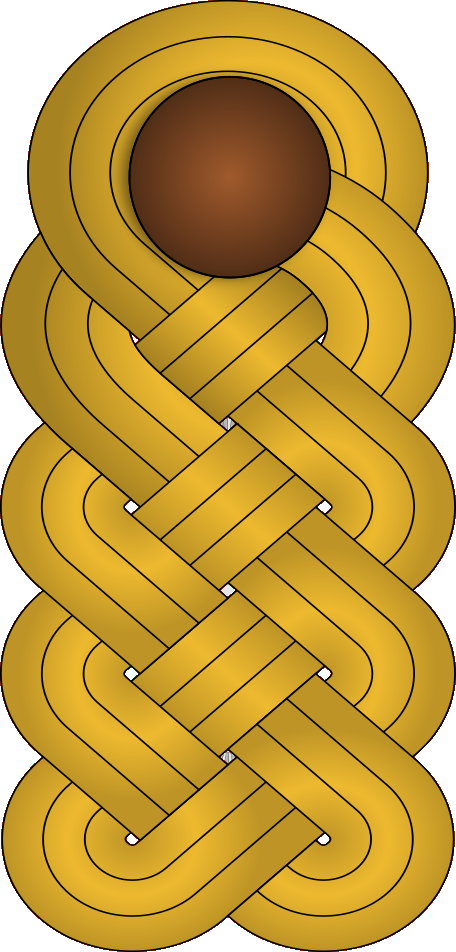
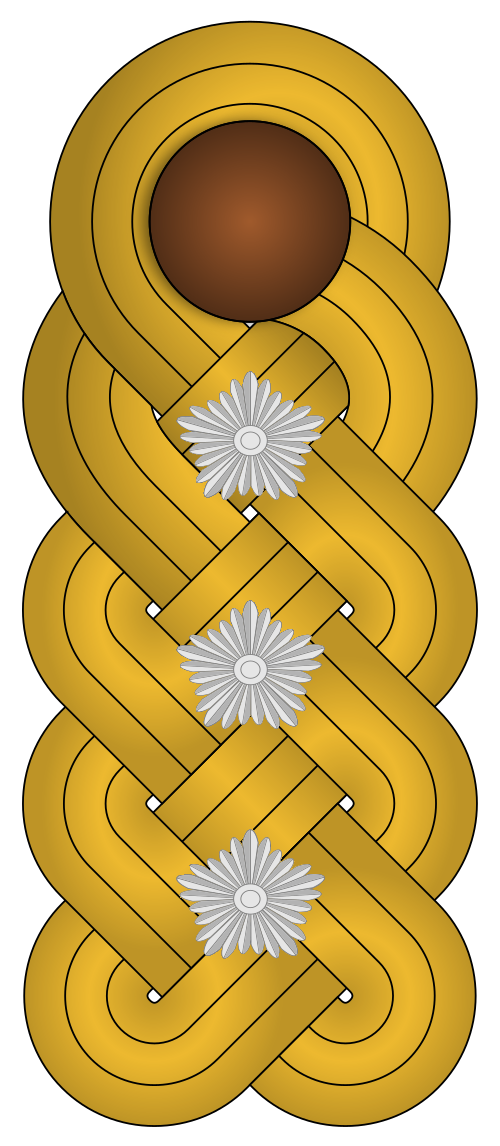
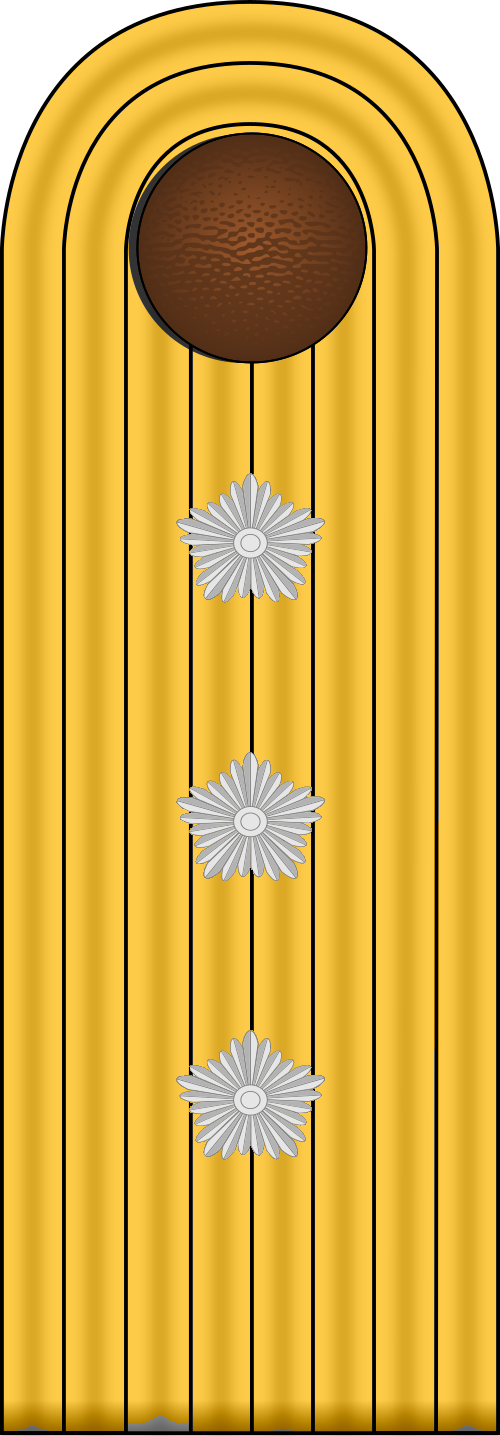
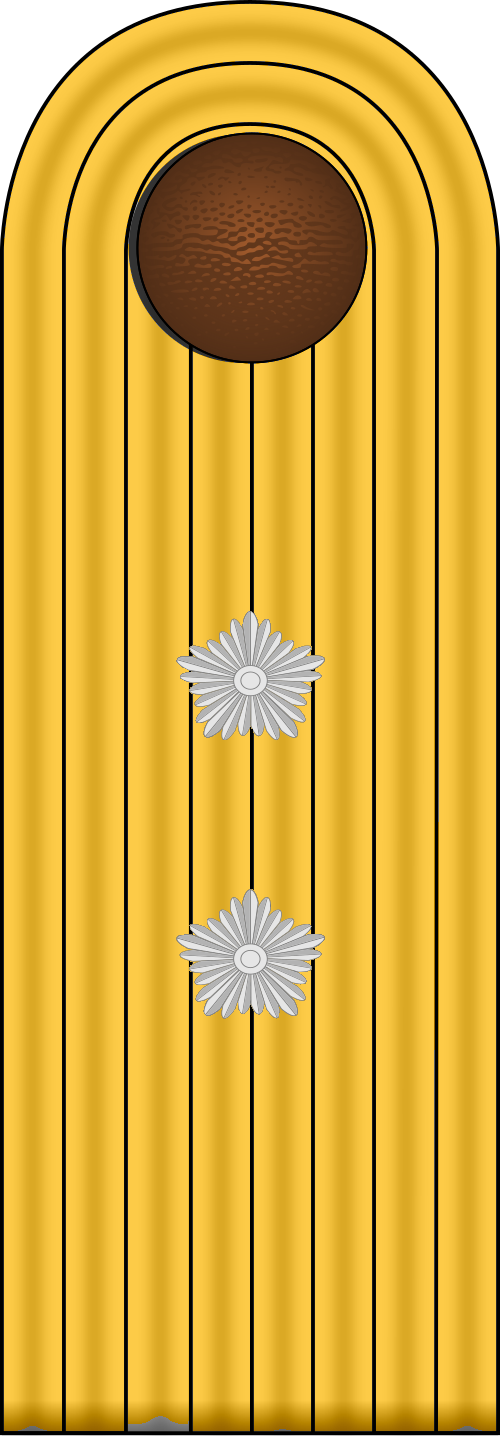
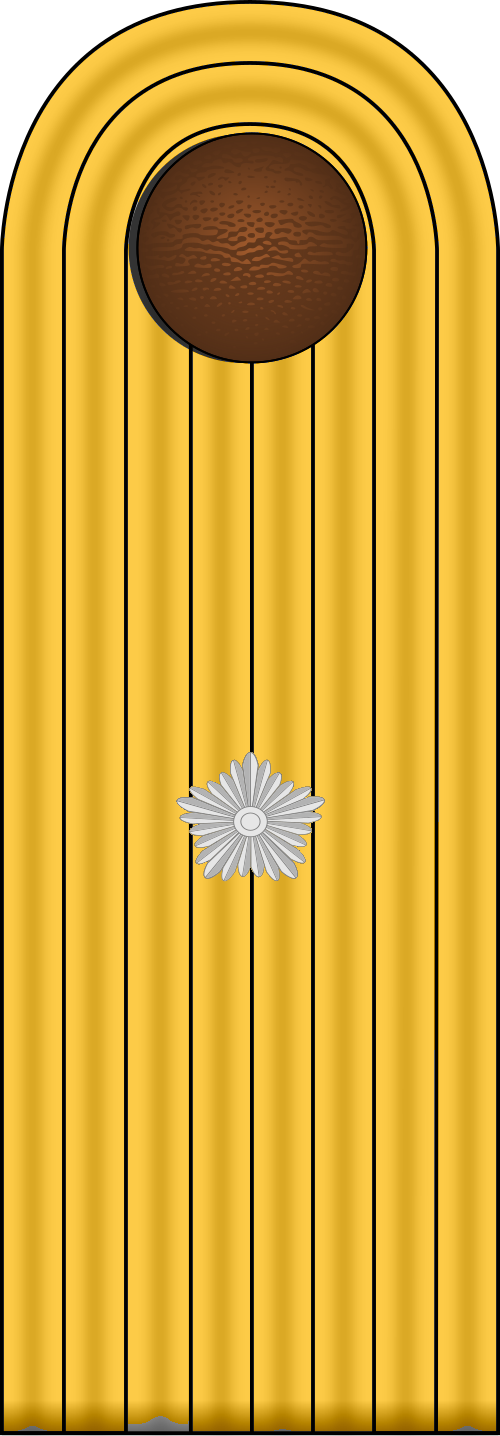
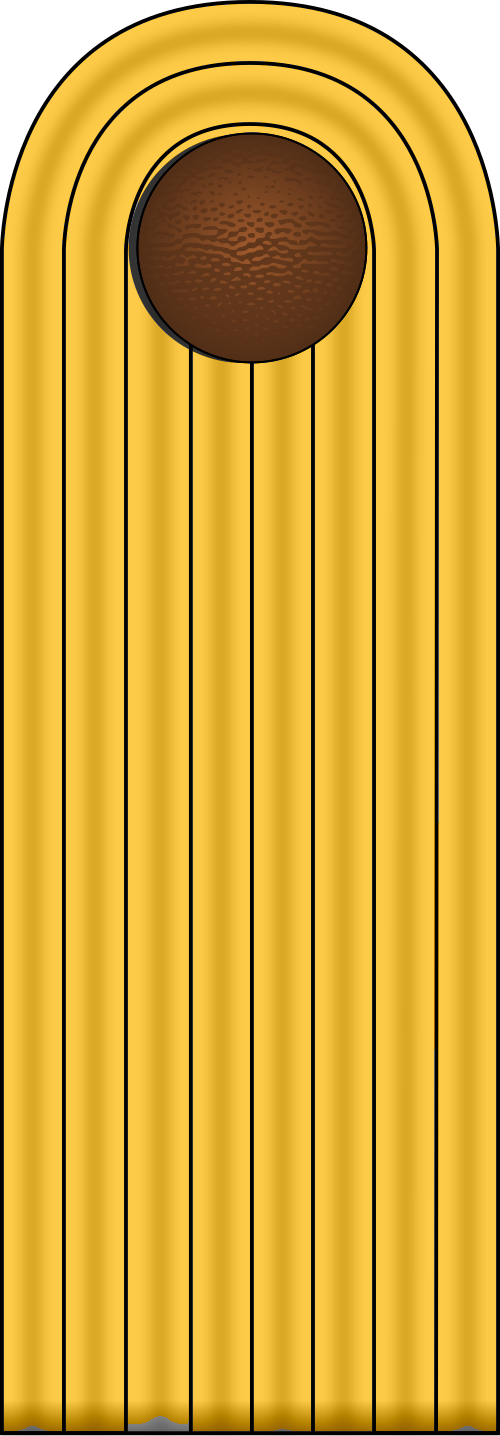
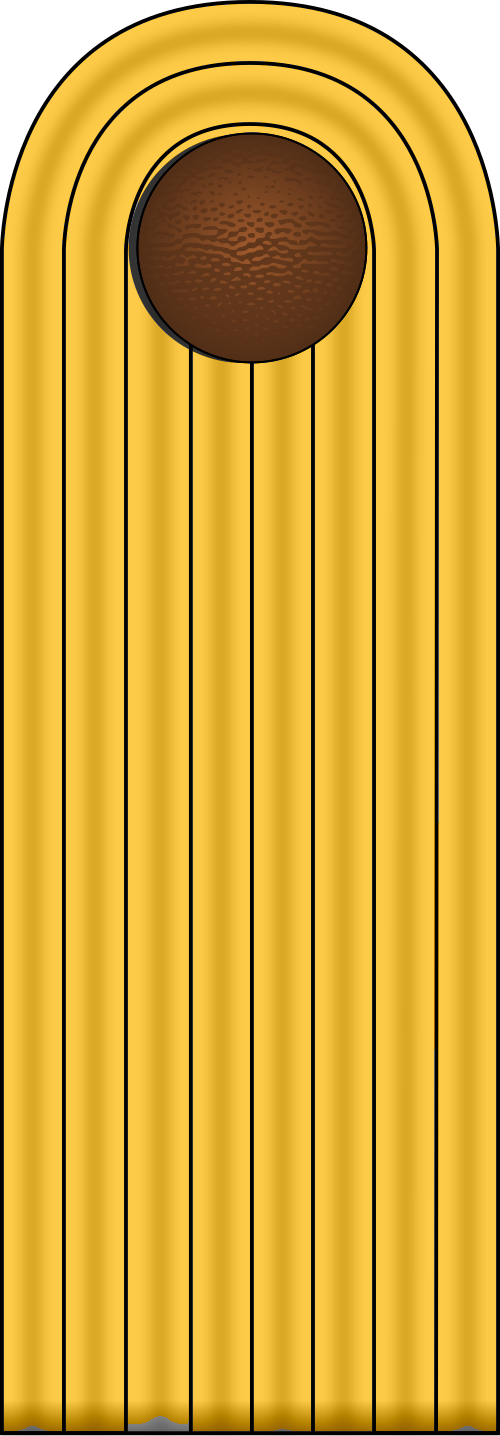
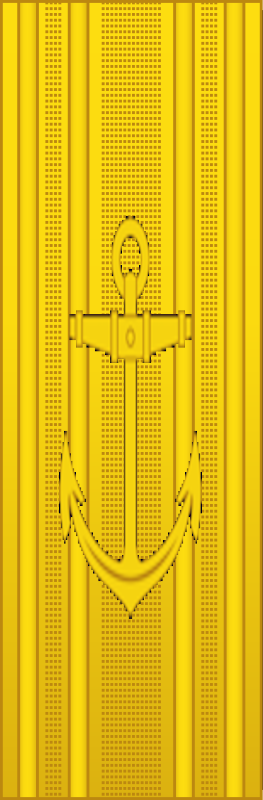
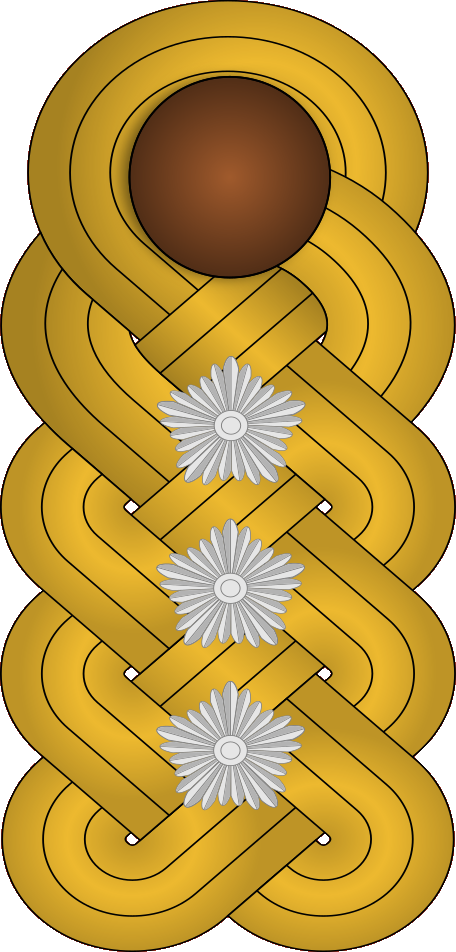
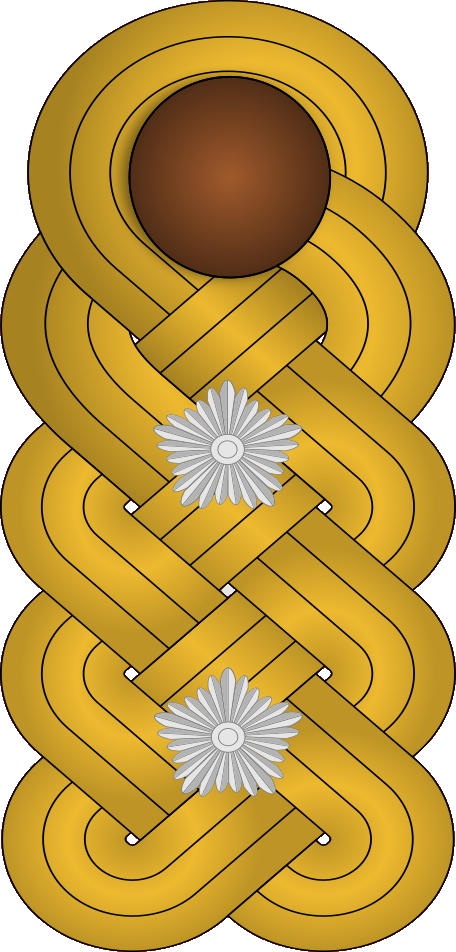
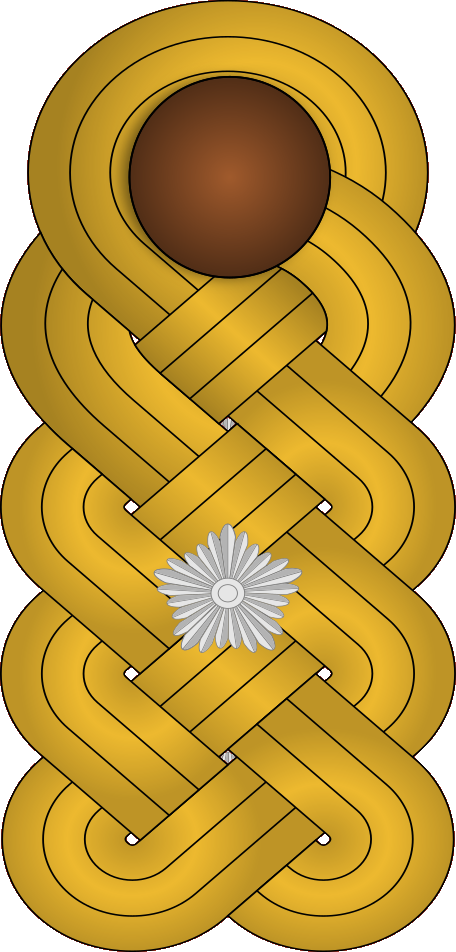
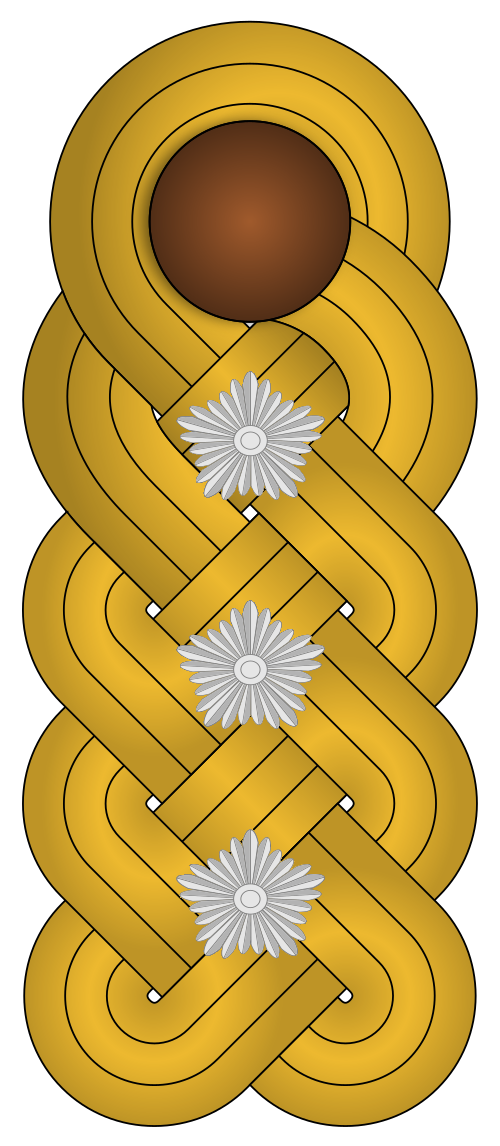
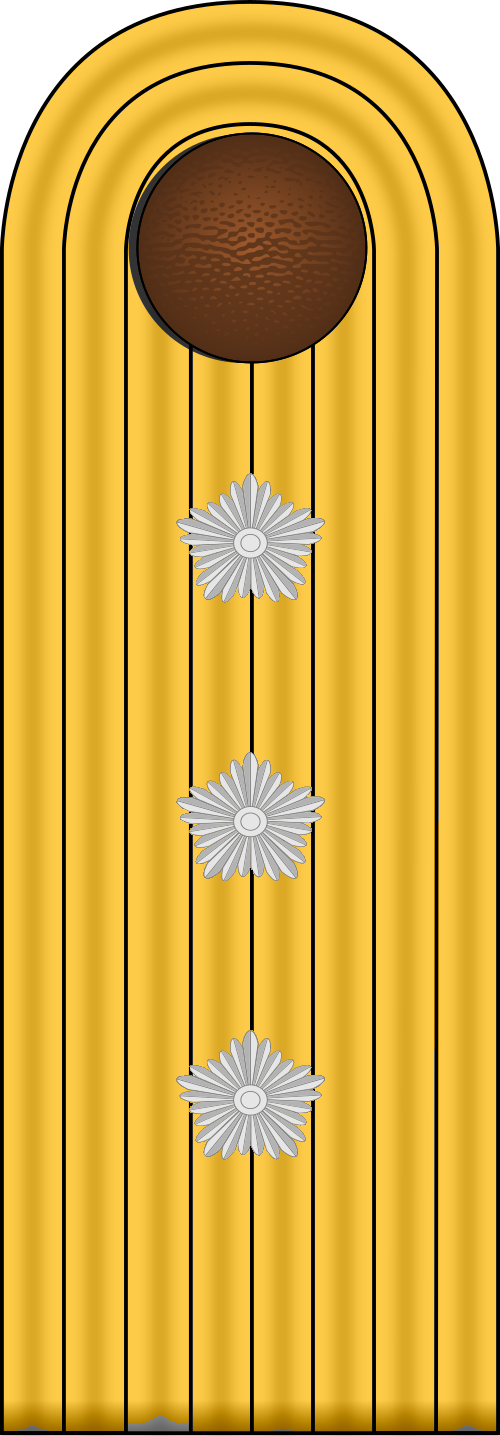
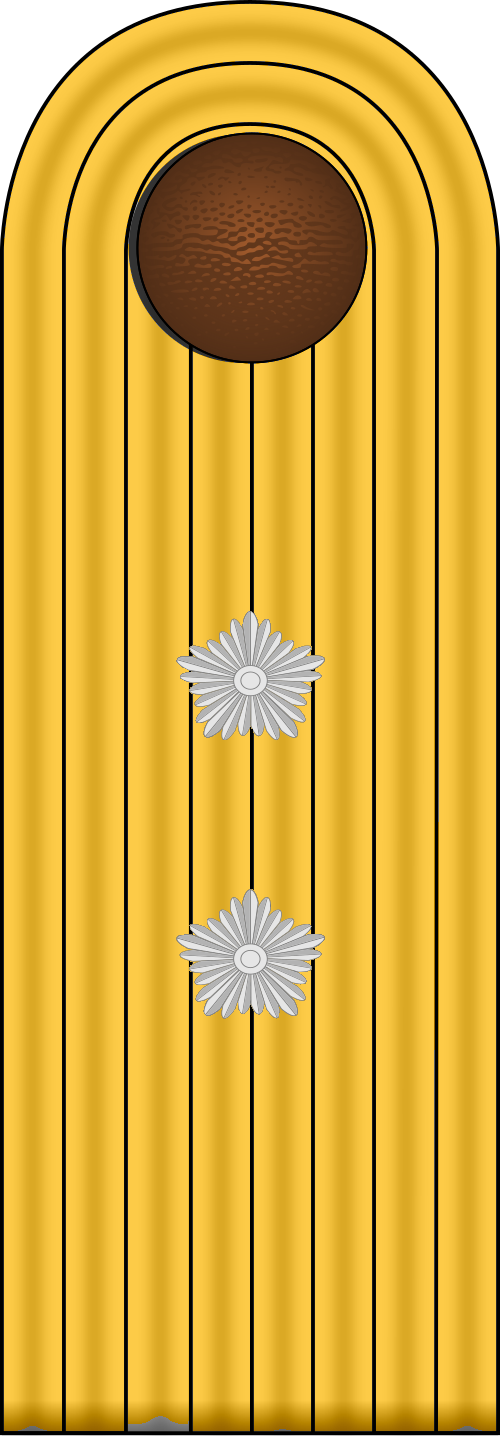
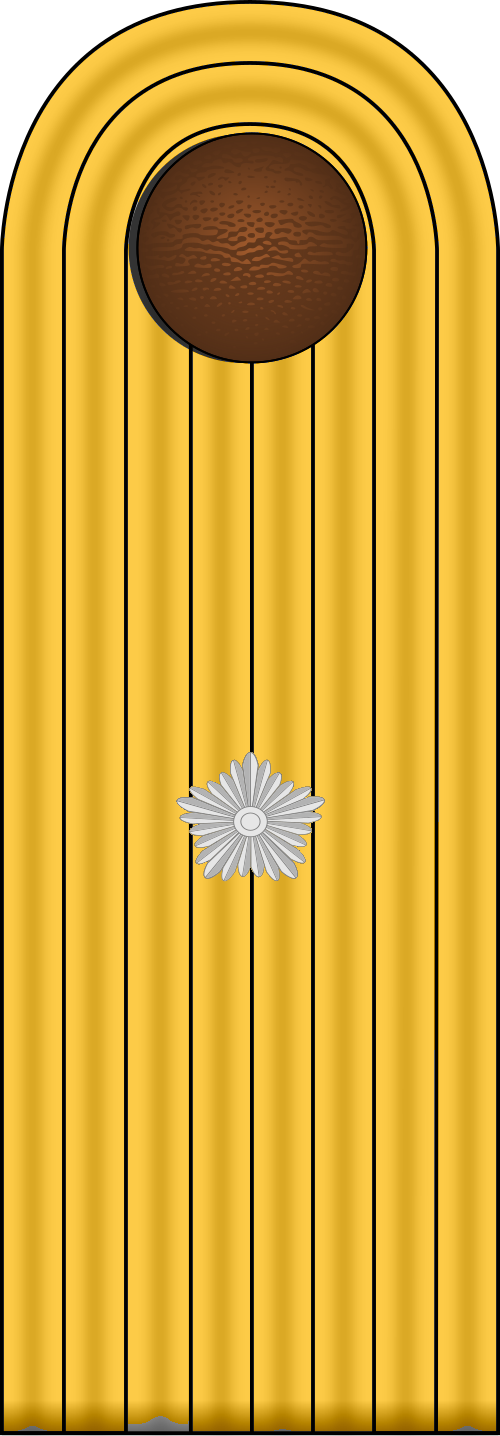
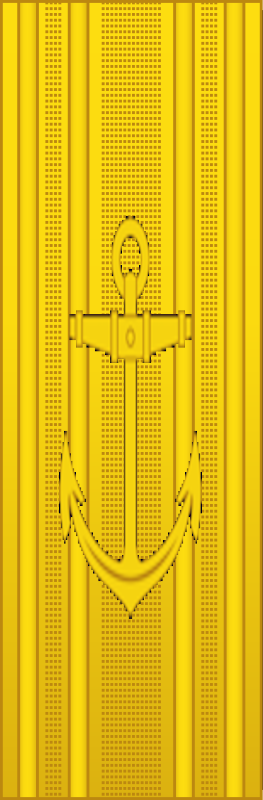
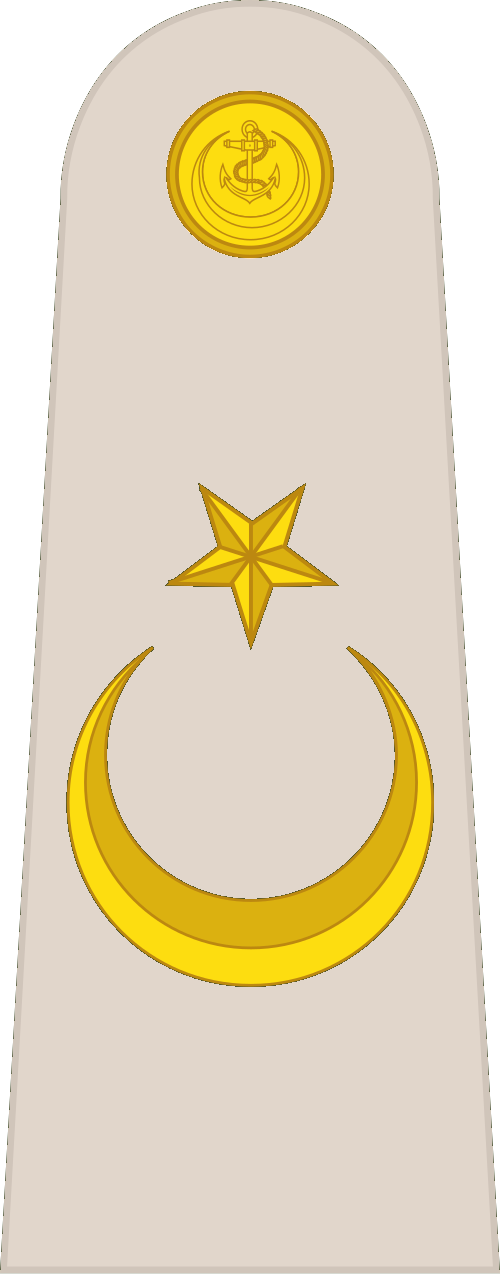
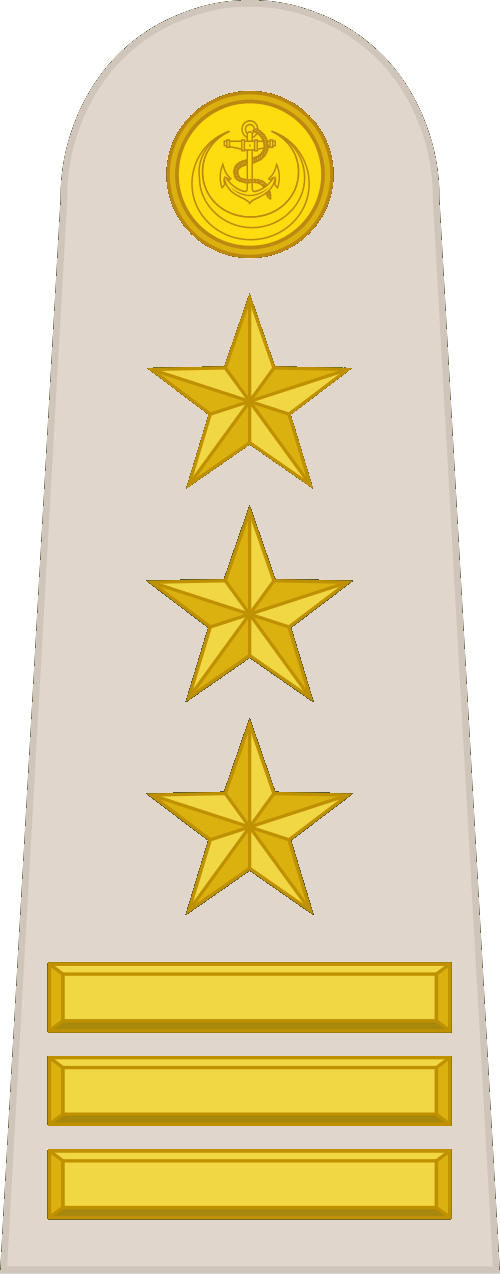
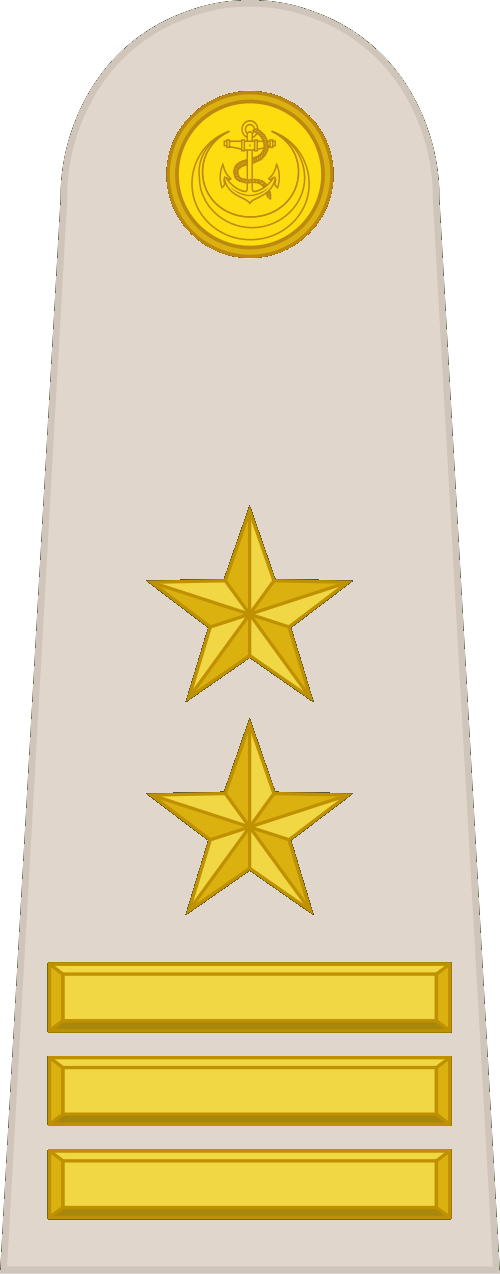
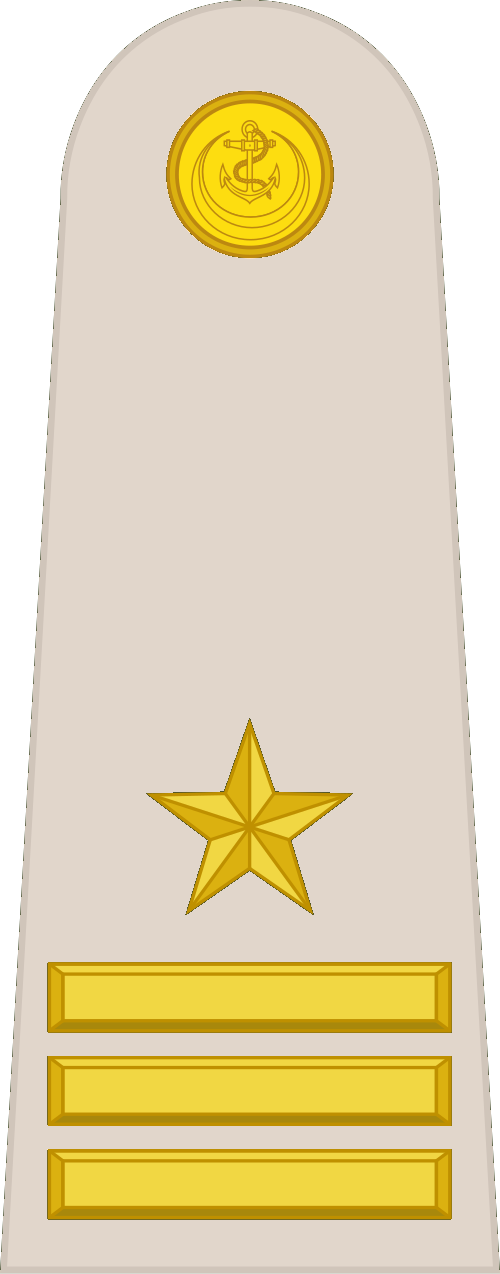
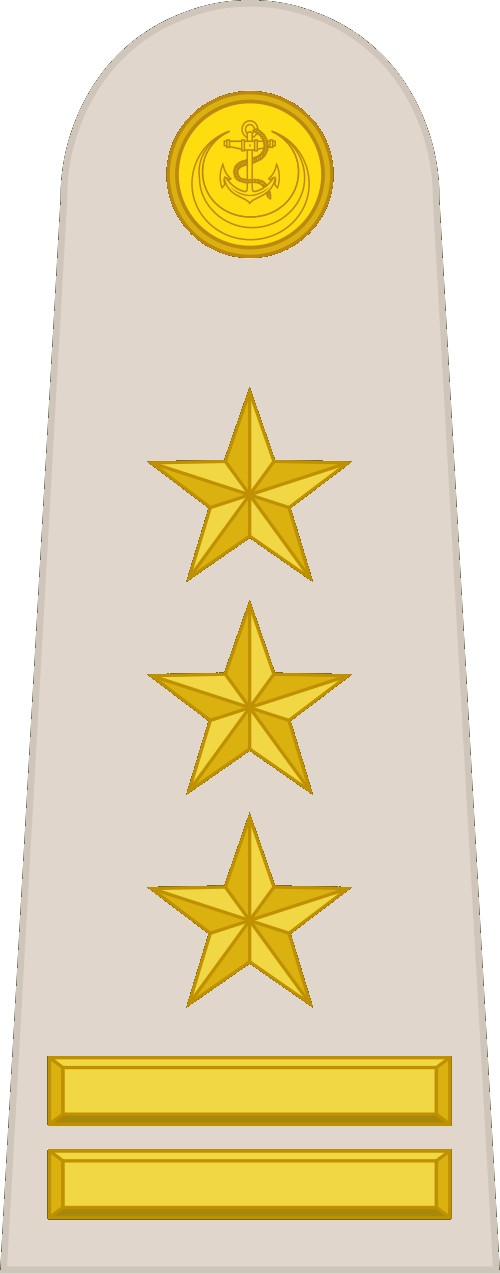
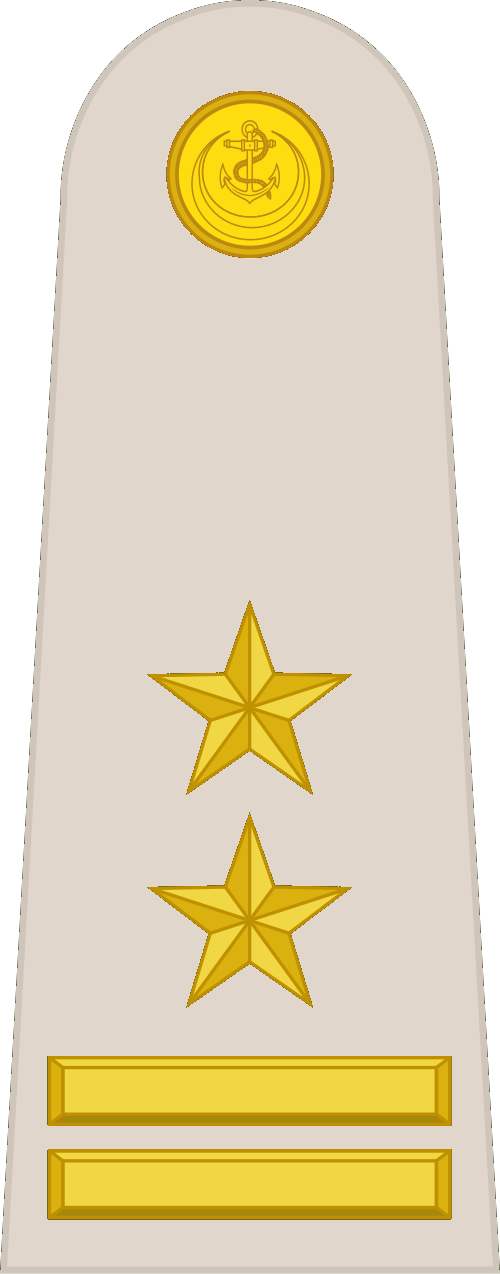
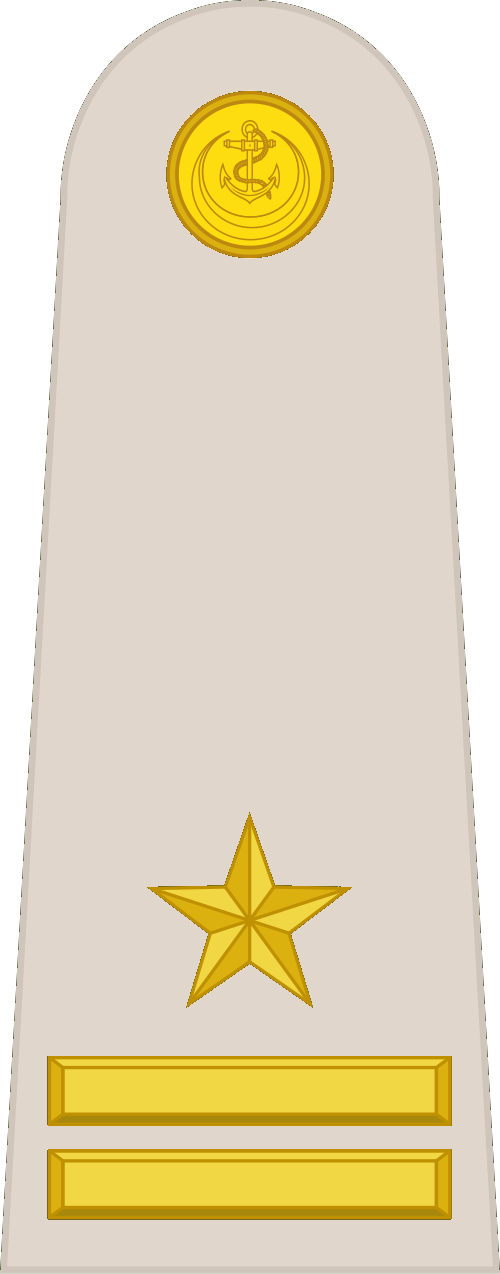
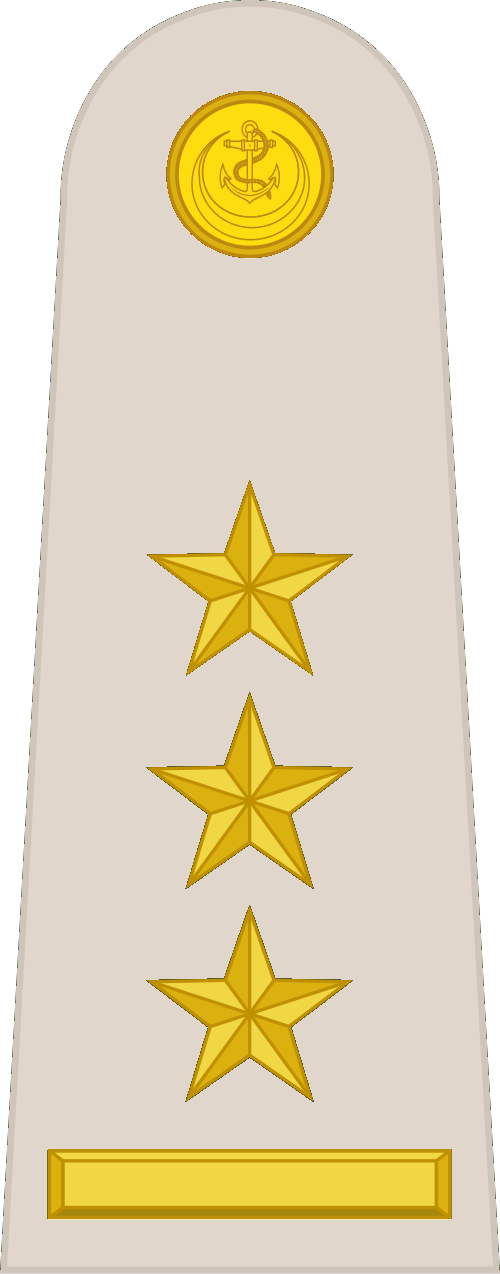
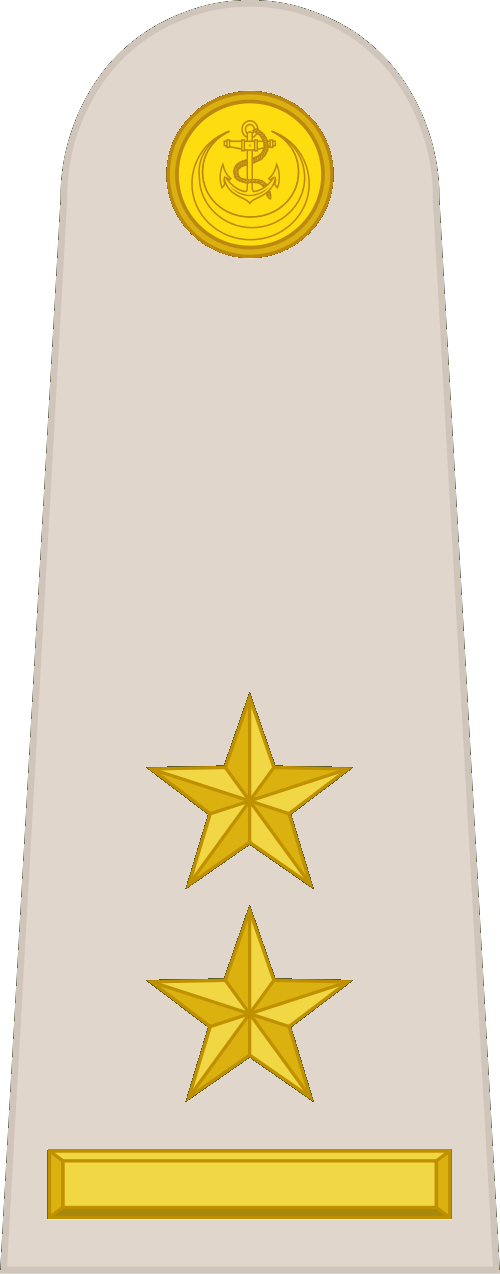
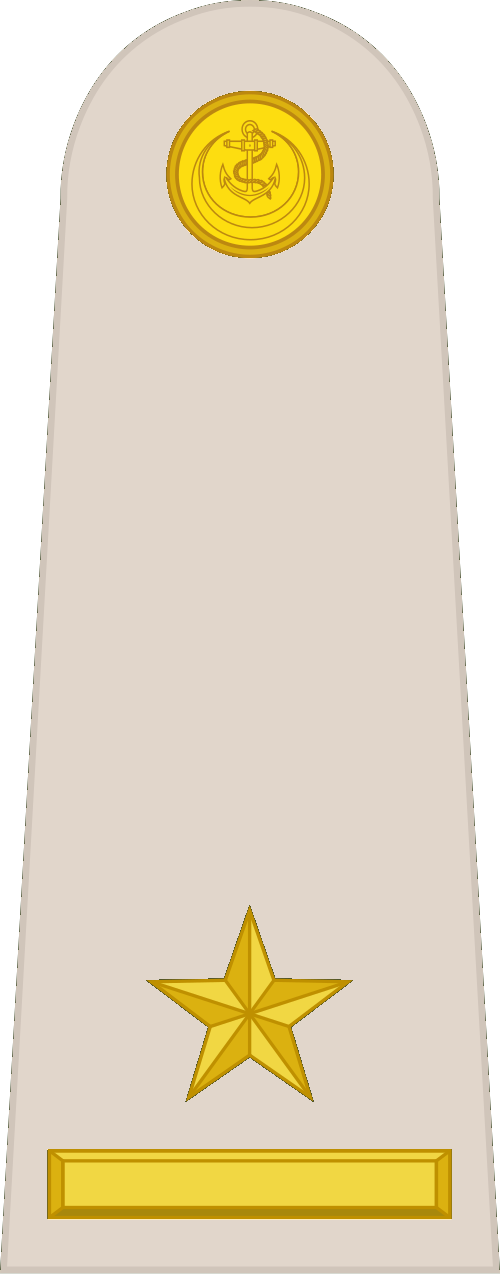
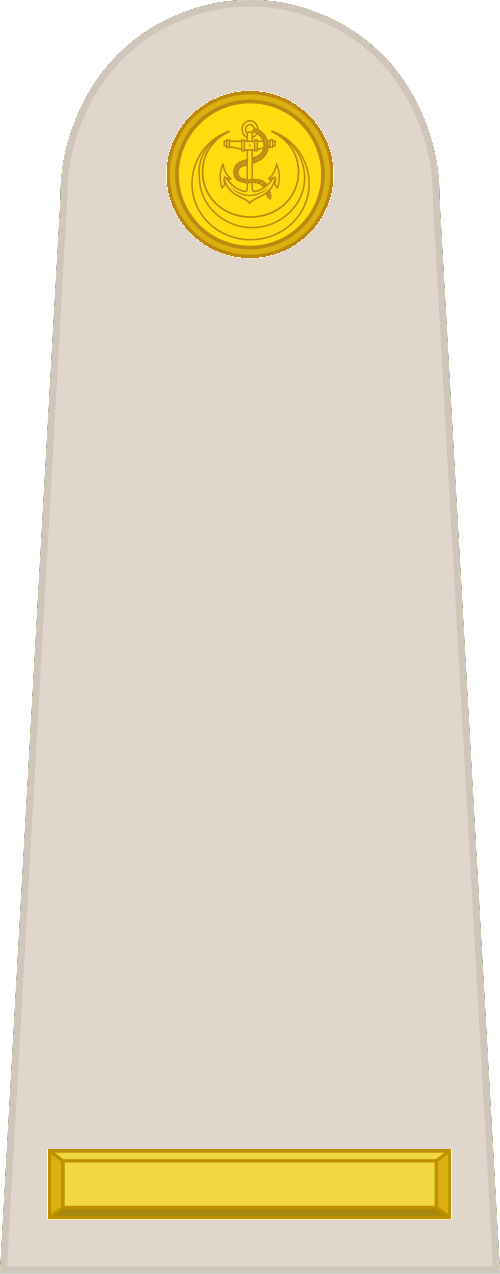
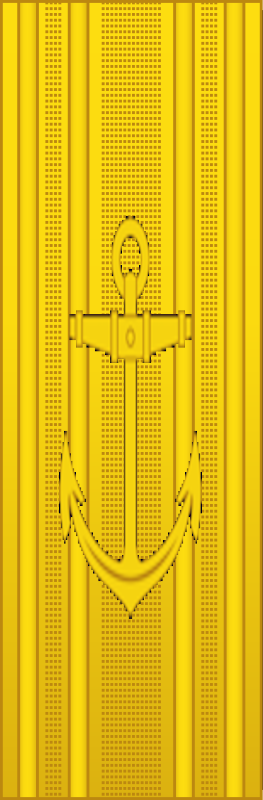
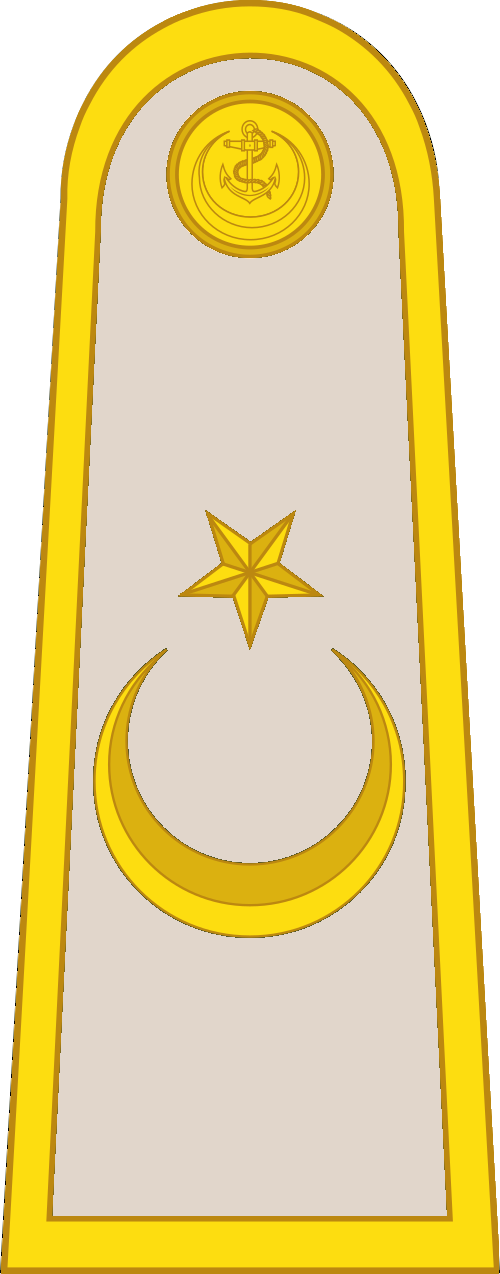
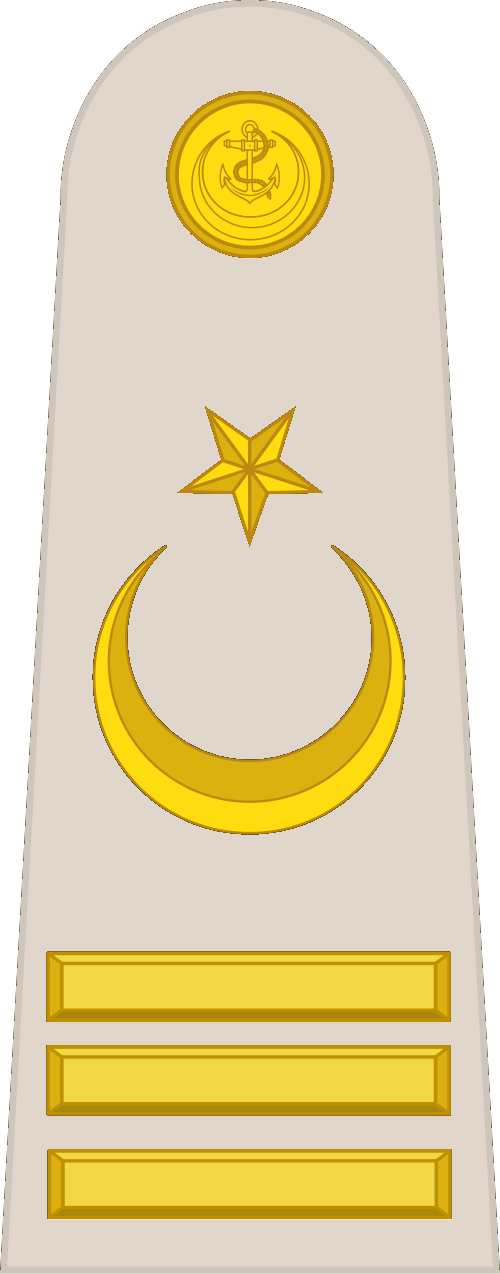
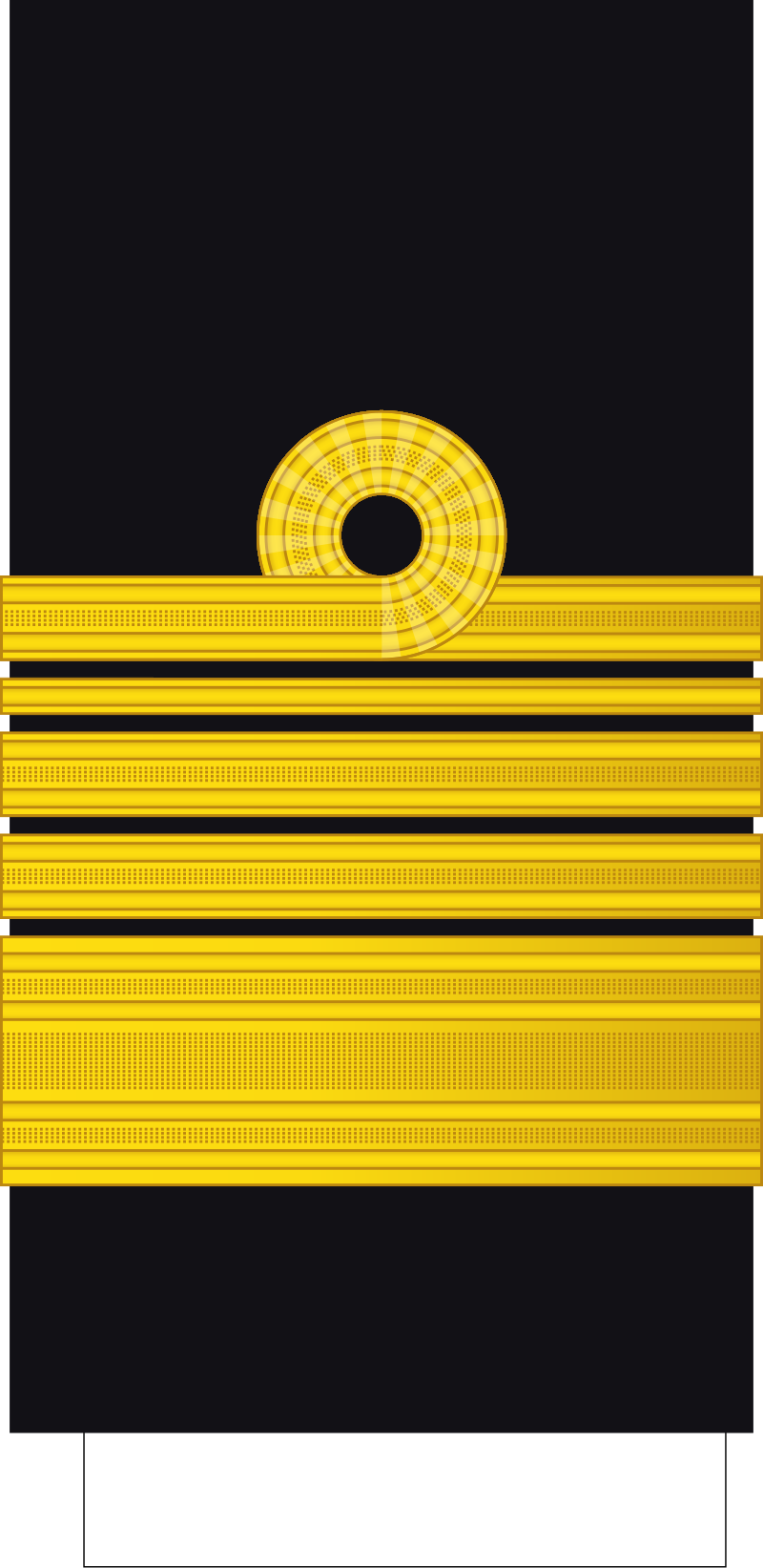
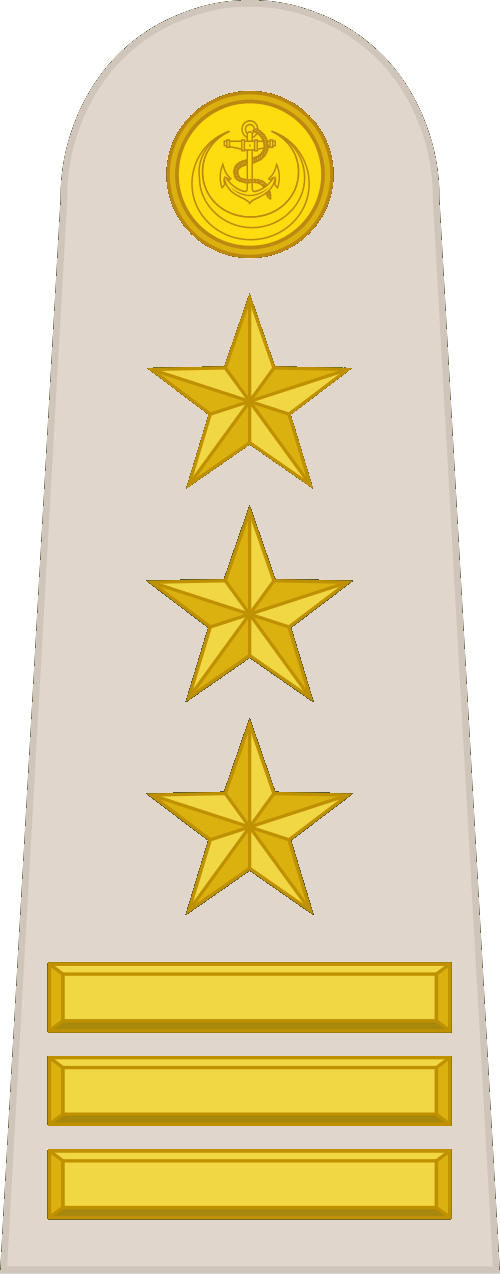
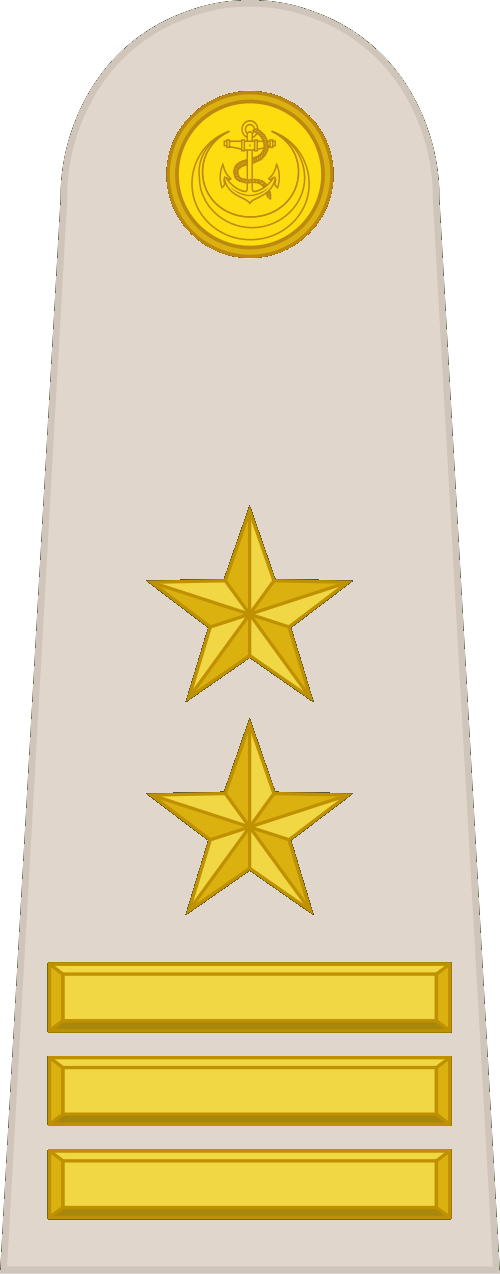
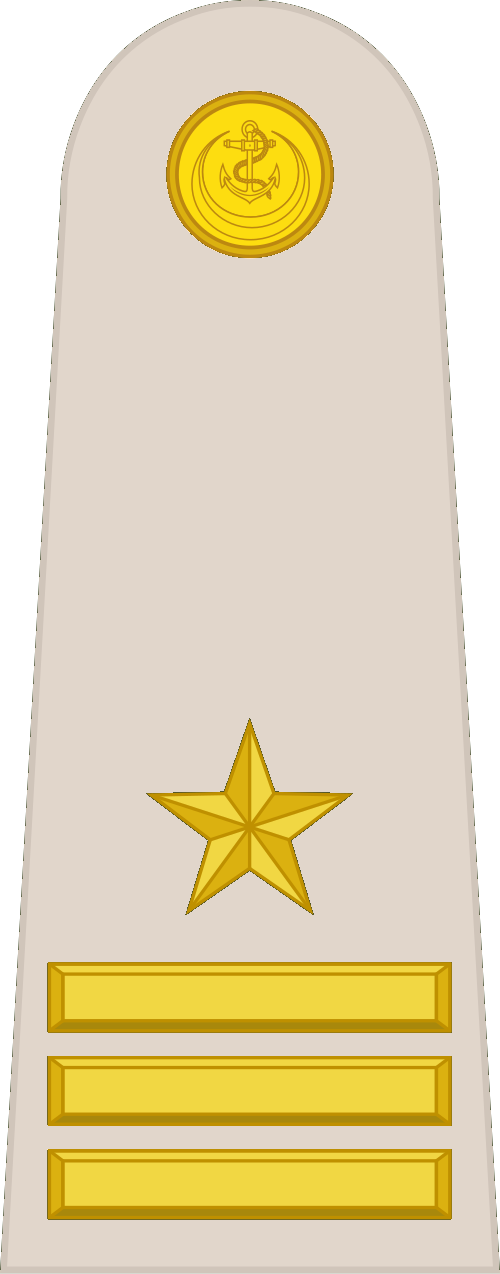
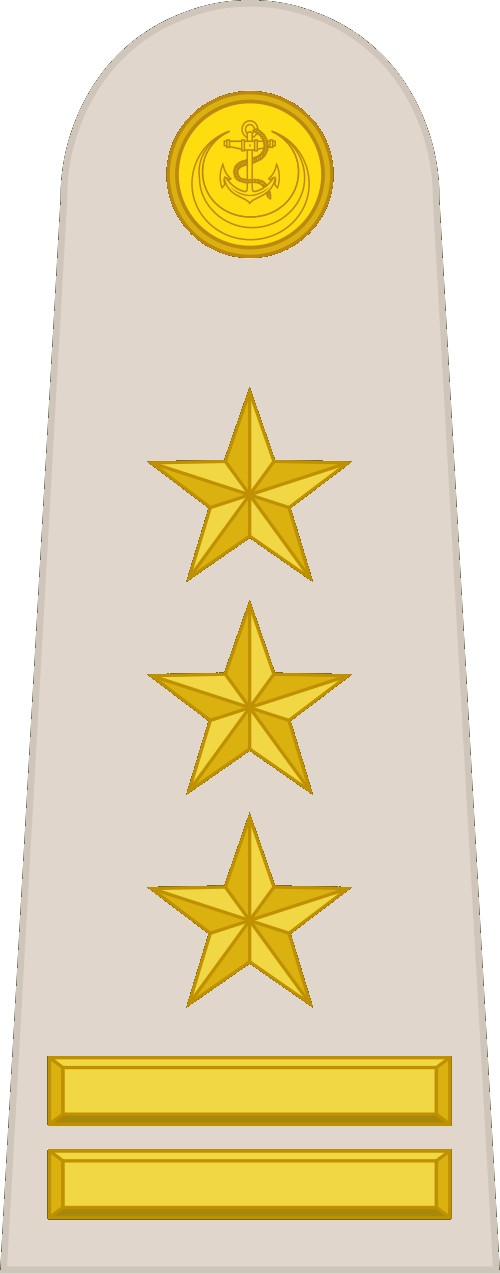
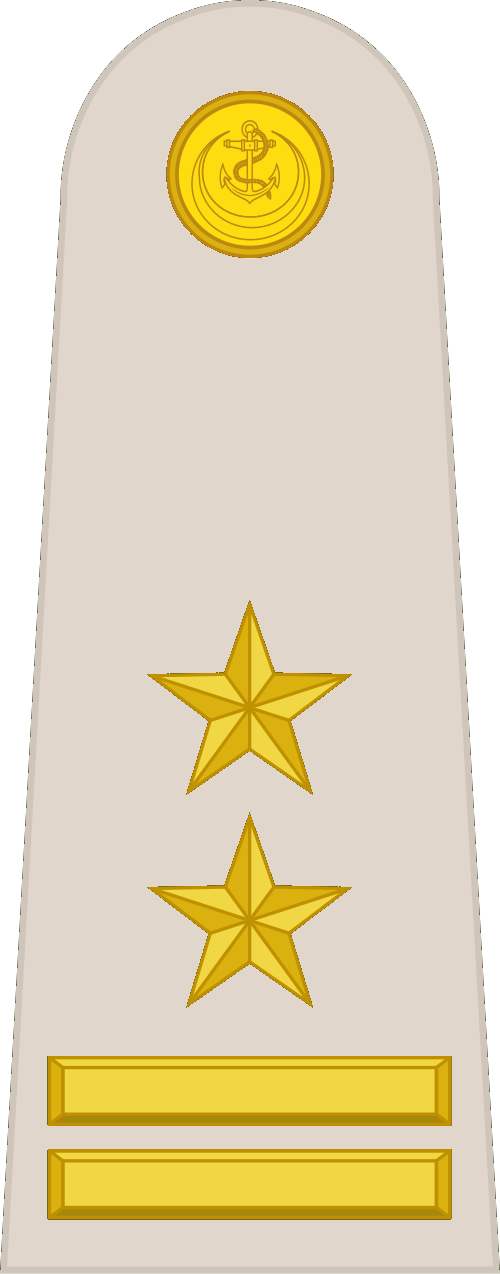
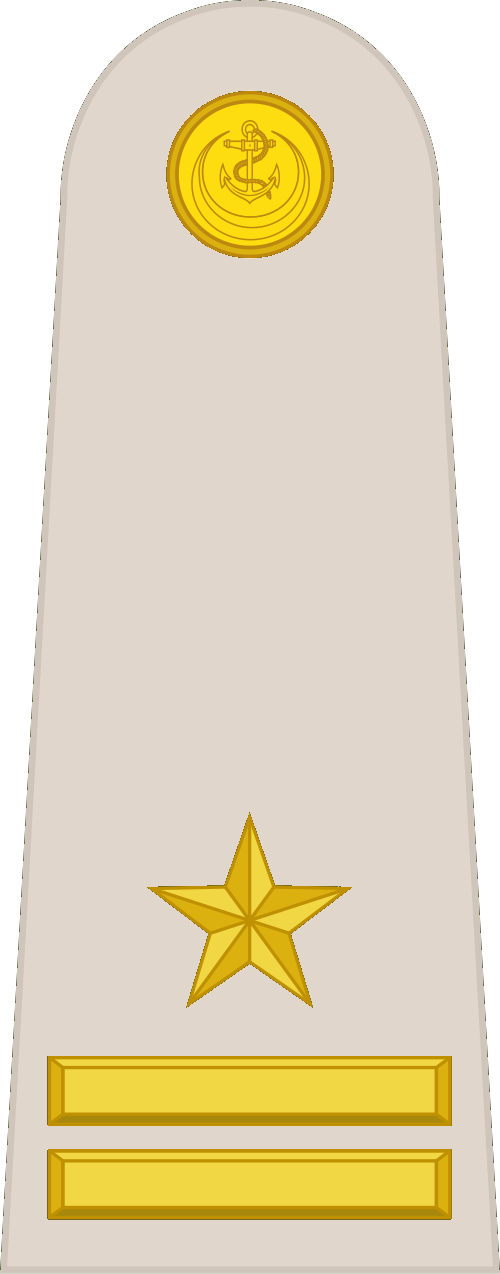
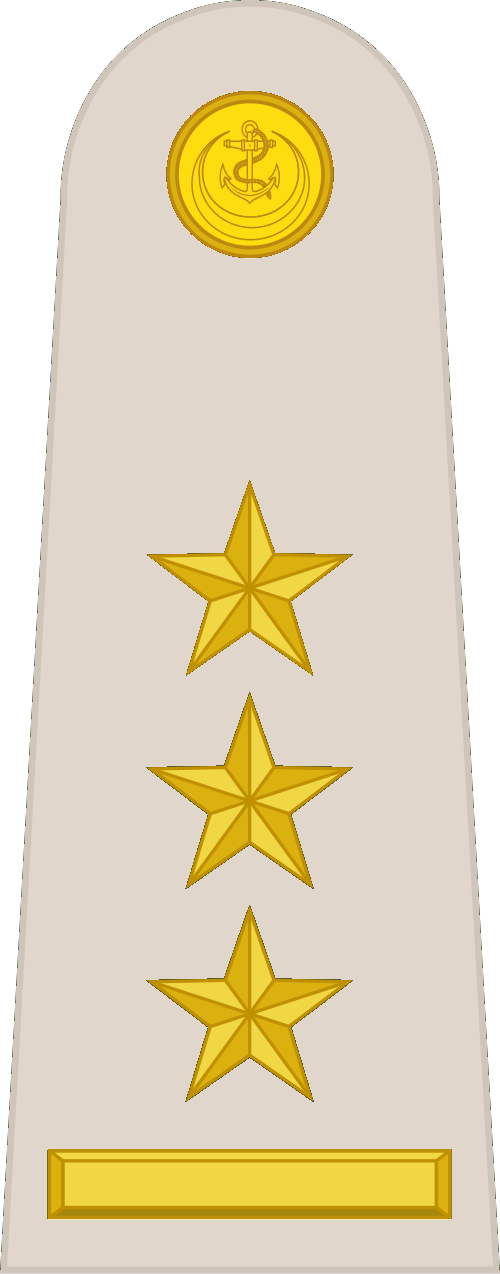
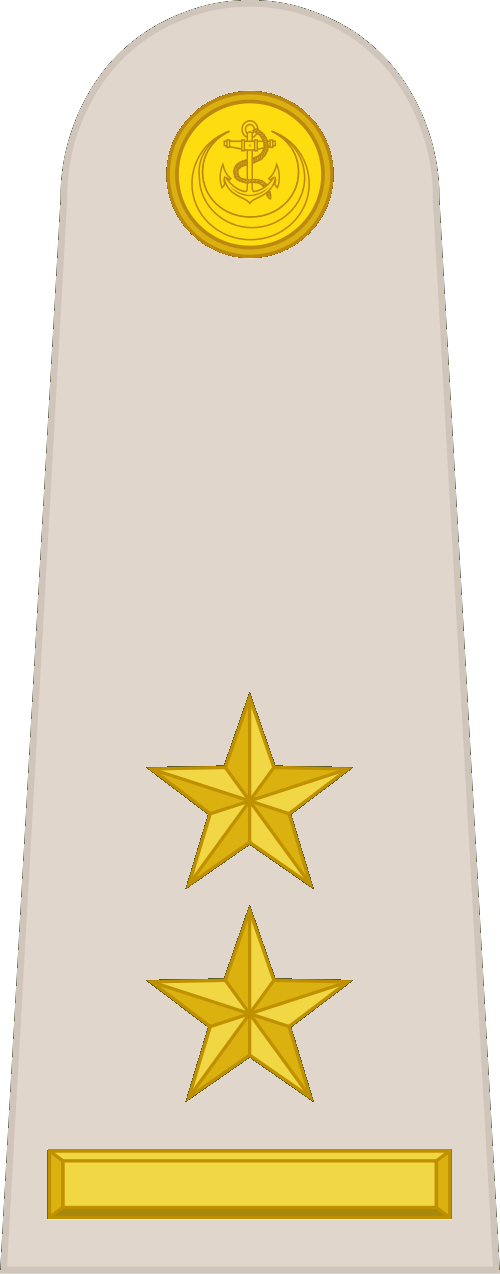
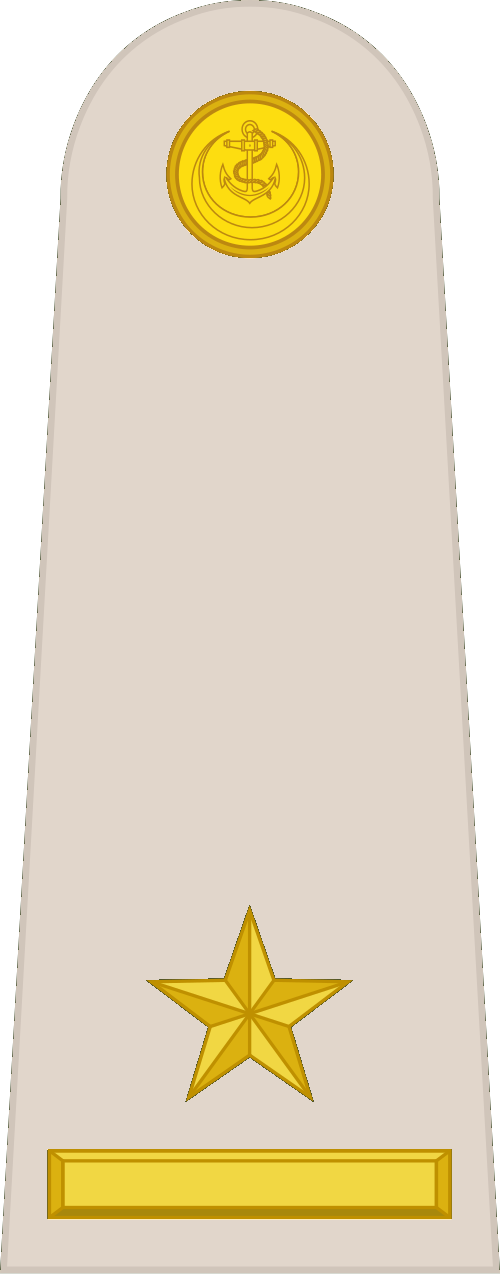
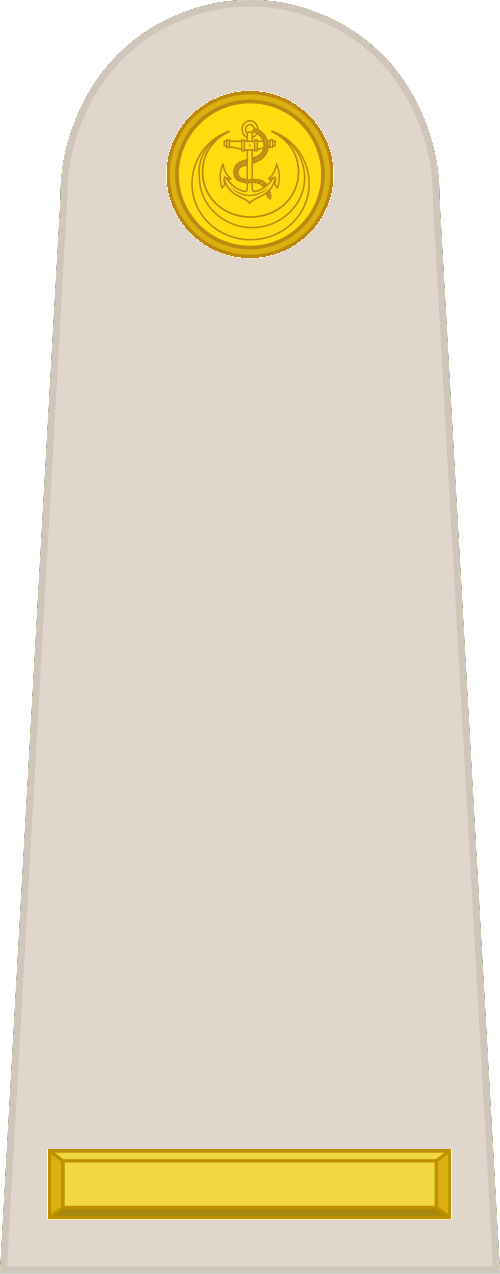
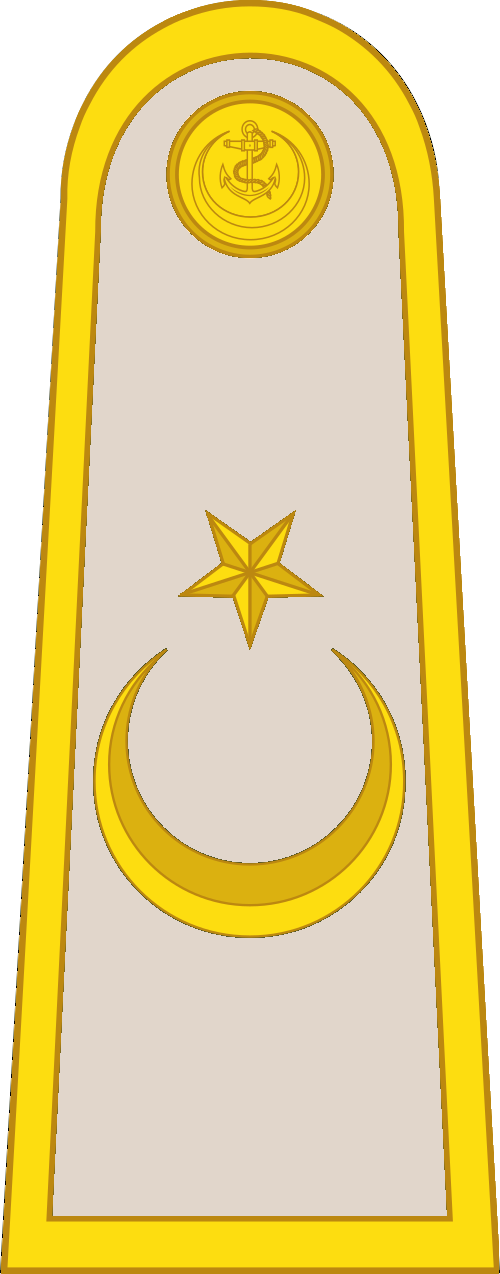
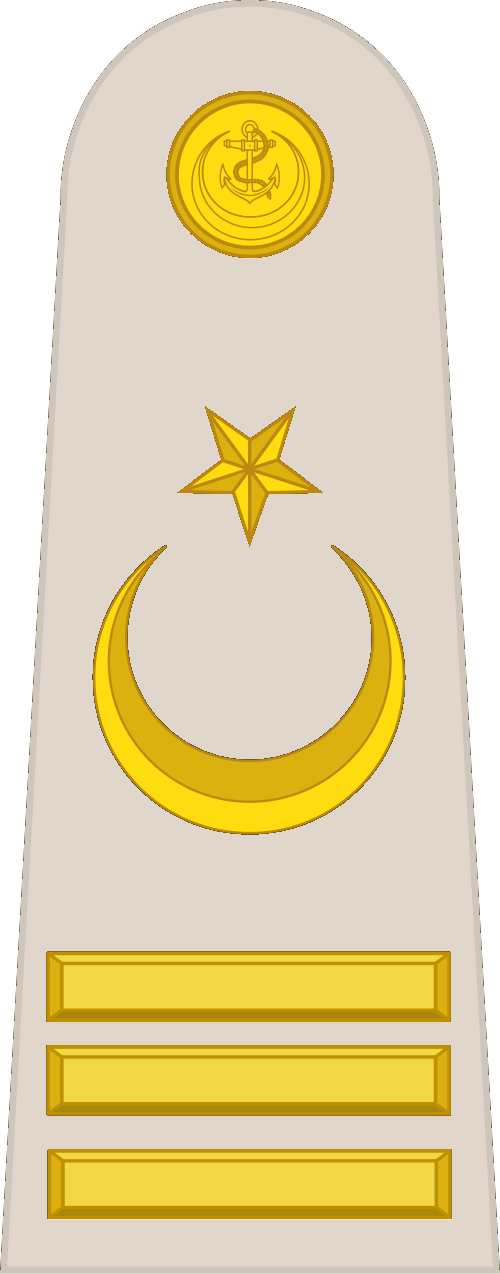
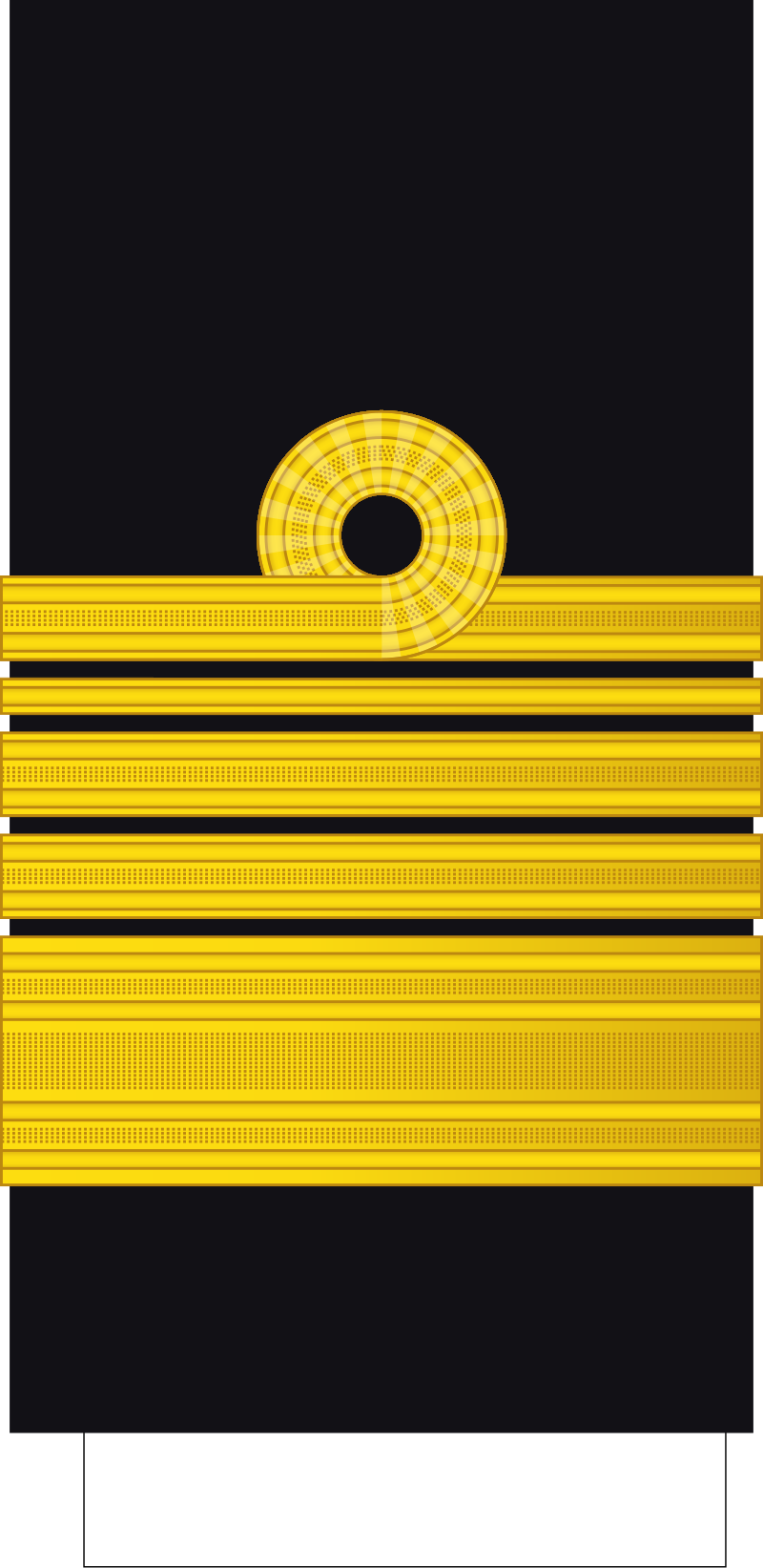
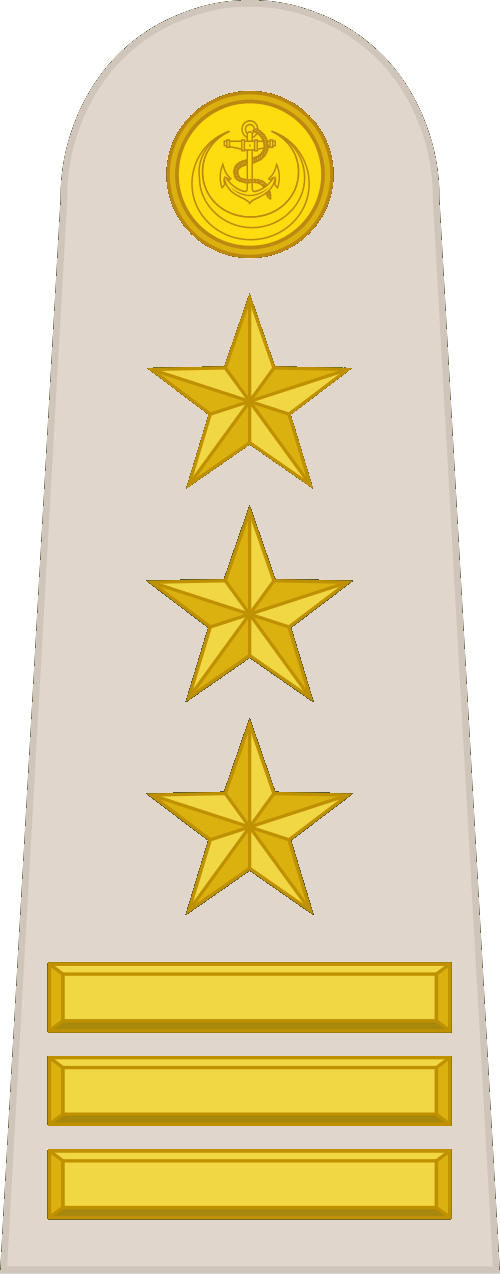
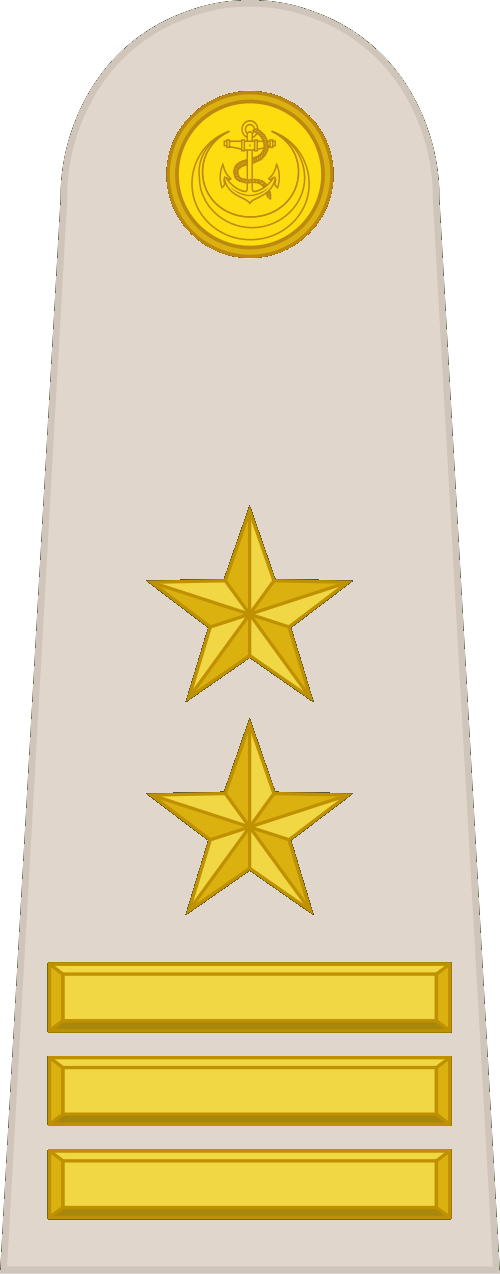
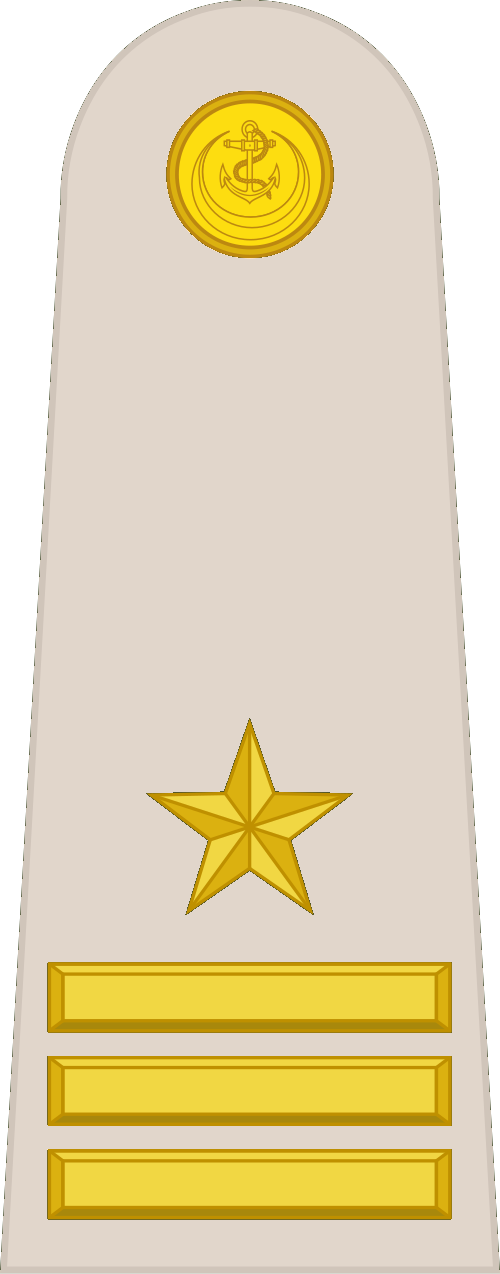
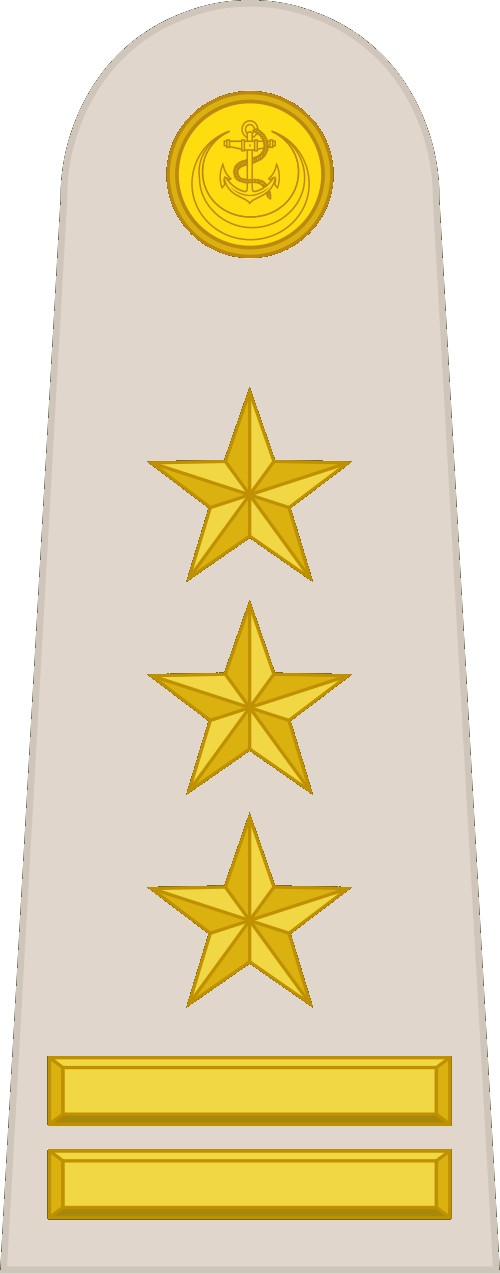
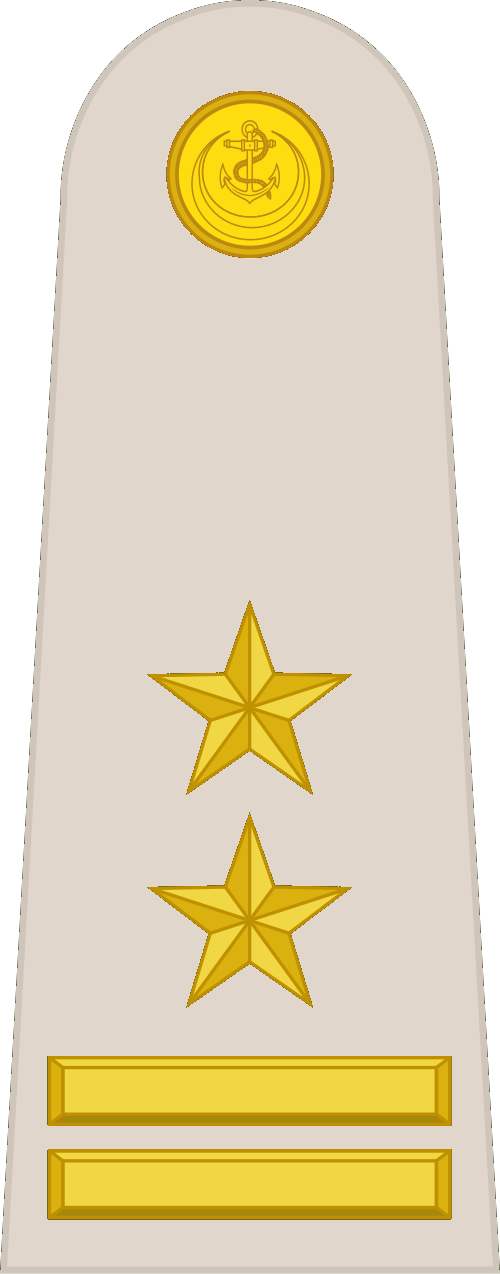
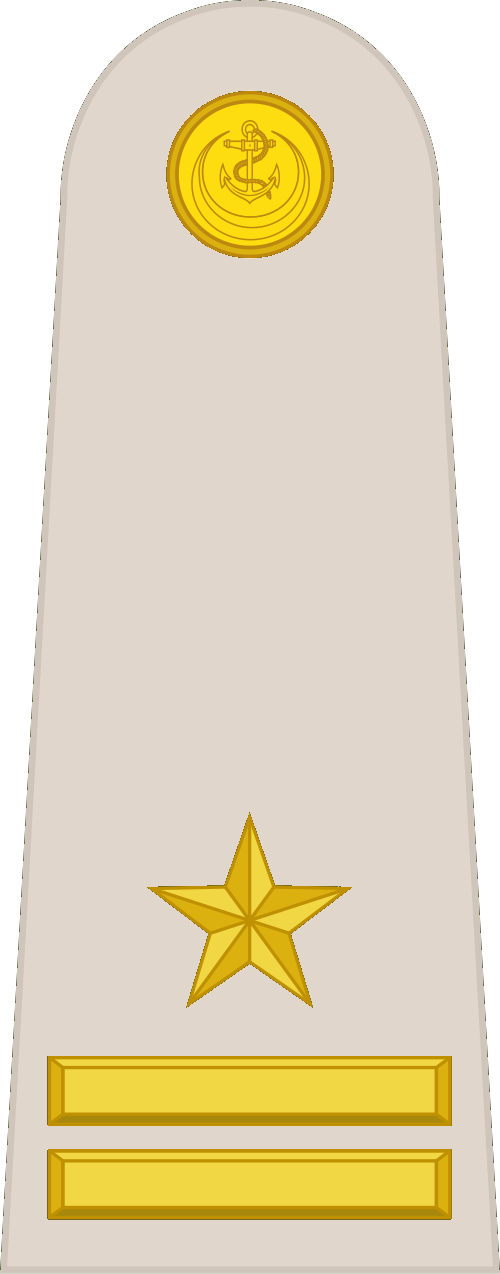
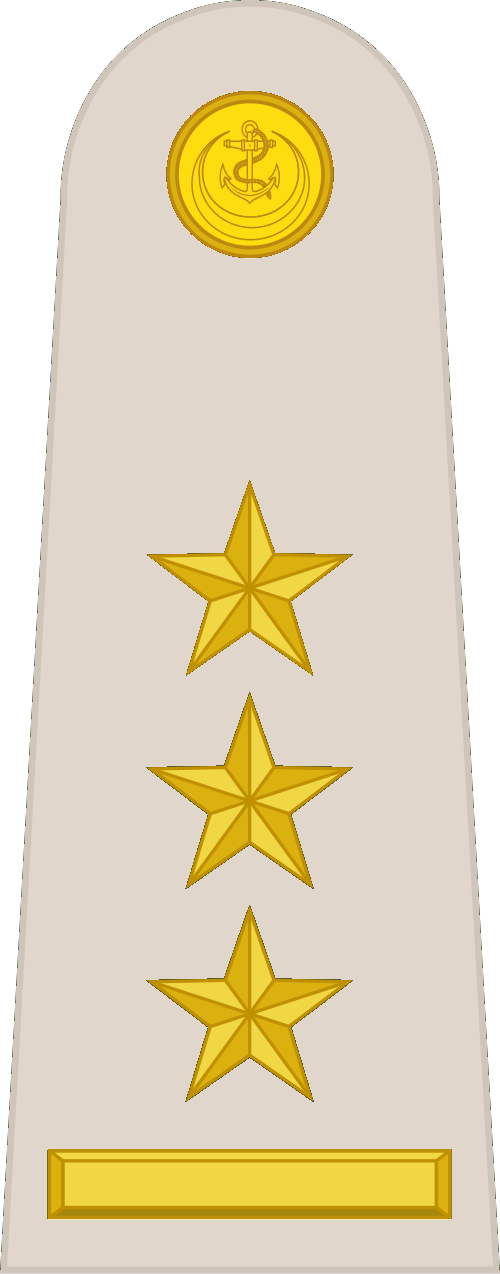
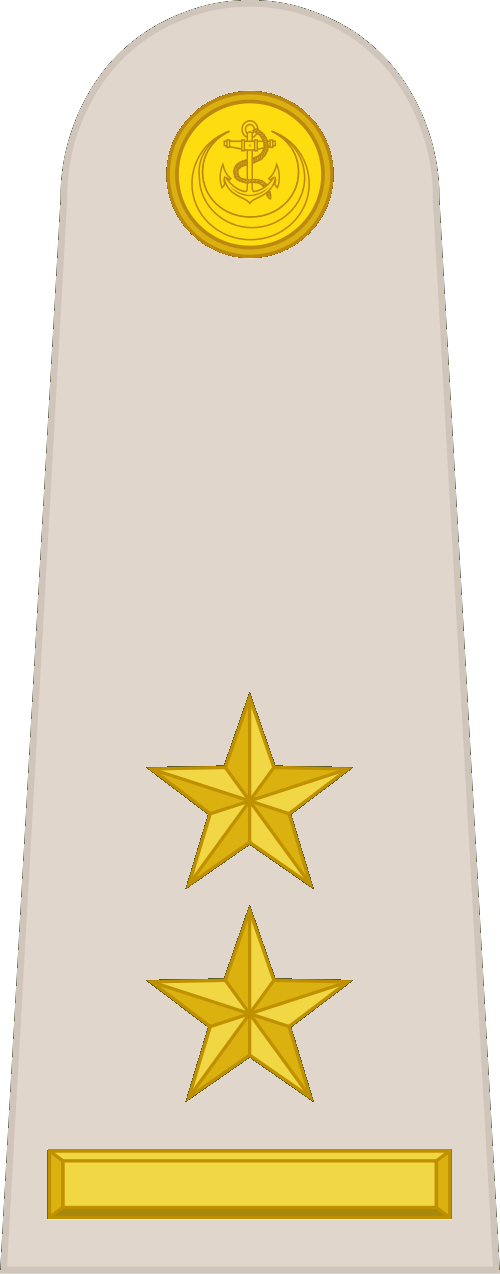
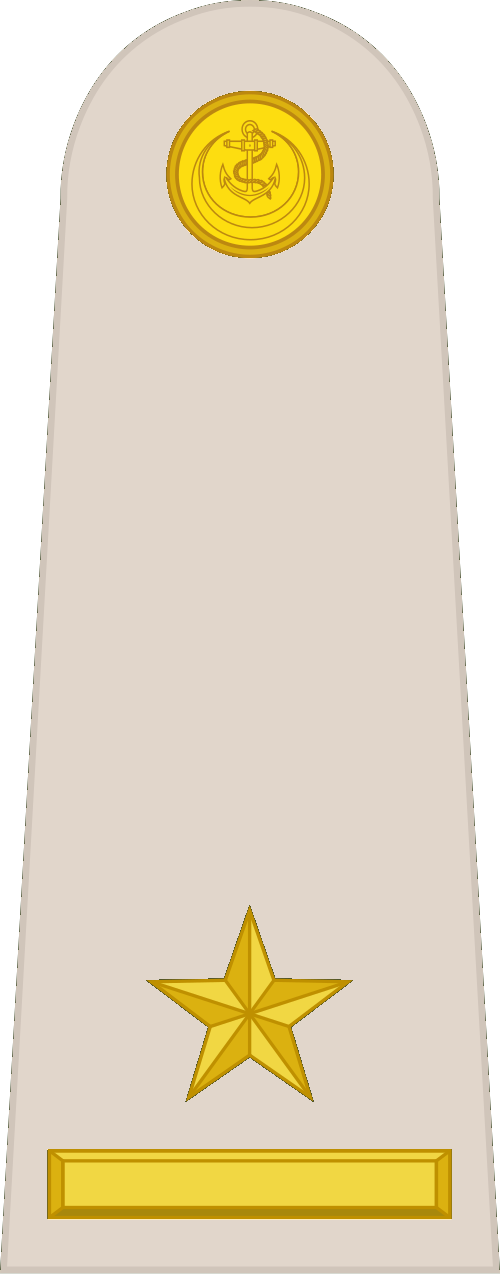
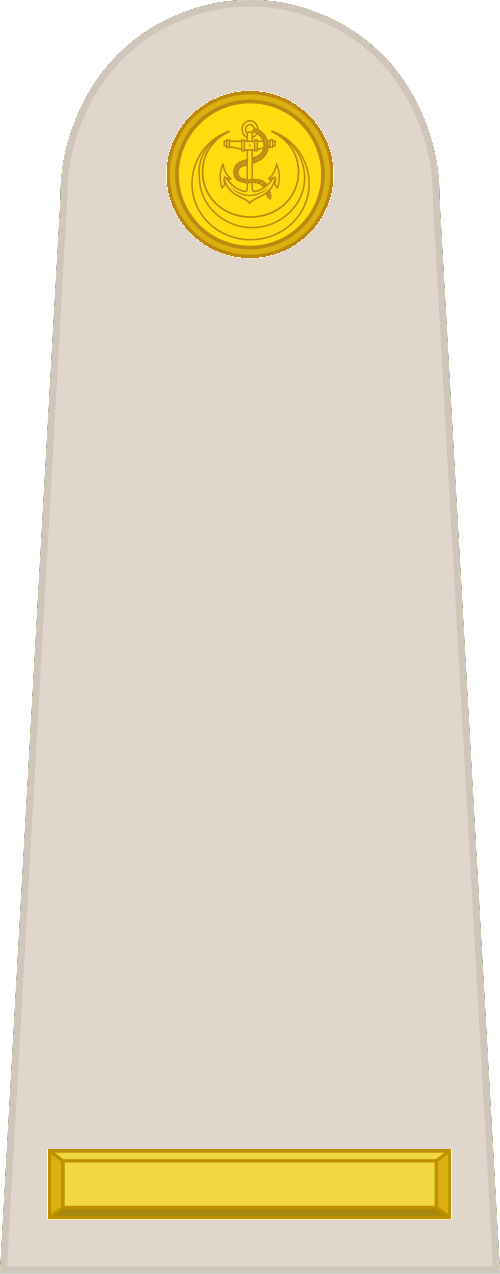
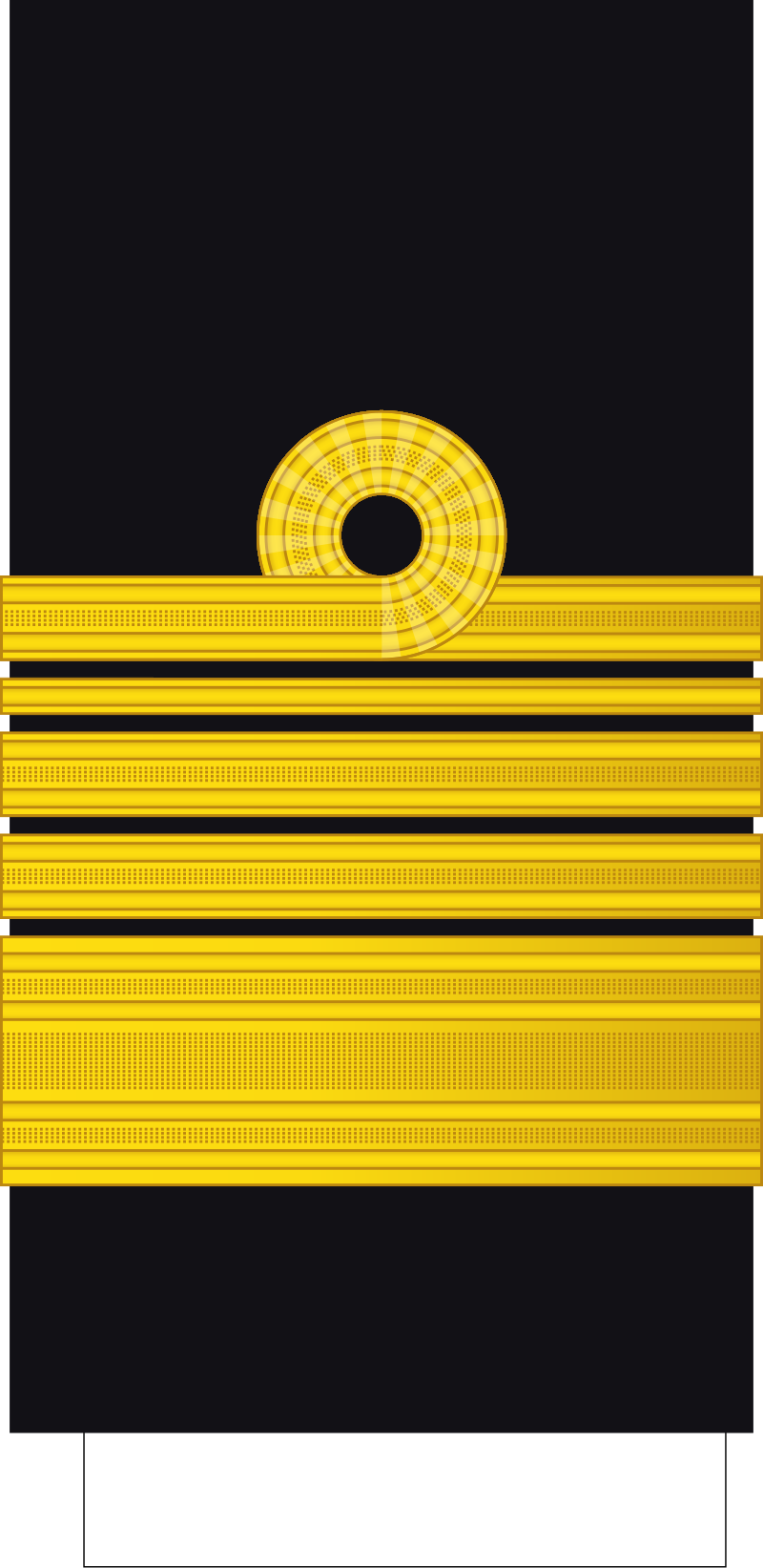
| Rank group | General / flag officers | | | | | Senior officers | | | Junior officers |
|---|---|---|---|---|---|---|---|---|---|---|---|---|---|
| 1920–1926 | | | | | | | | | | | | | (Note: Worn on the collar.) |
| 1920–1926 | مشیر امیرال; Müşîr amiral | امیرال; Amiral | ویس امیرال; Vice amiral | لوا امیرال; Liva amiral | قومودور; Komodor | قلیون قپتانی; Kalyon kaptanı | فرقاته ین قپتانی; Fırkateyn kaptanı | قوروت قپتانی; Korvet kaptanı | بیرینجی صنف یوزباشی; Birinci sınıf yüzbaşı | یوزباشی; Yüzbaşı | ملازم اول; Mülâzım-ı evvel | ملازم ثانی; Mülâzım-ı sânî | مهندس; Mühendis |
| 1926–1933 |
| 1926–1933 | مشیر; Müşîr | فريق اول; Ferîk-i evvel | | فريق; Ferîk | ميرلوا; Mirliva | ميرآلاى; Miralay | قائم مقام; Kaymakam | بينباشى; Binbaşı | قدملی یوزباشی; Kıdemli yüzbaşı | یوزباشی; Yüzbaşı | | ملازم; Mülâzım | مهندس; Mühendis |
| 1933–1935 |
| 1933–1935 | Müşîr | Birinci ferîk | | Ferîk | Mirliva | Miralay | Kaymakam | Binbaşı | Yüzbaşı | | Birinci mülâzım | Mülâzım | Zabit vekili |
| 1935–1938 |
| 1935–1938 | Büyük amiral | Oramiral | Koramiral | Tümamiral | Tuğamiral | Albay | Yarbay | Binbaşı | Yüzbaşı | | Teğmen | Asteğmen | Yarsubay |
| 1938–1947 |
| 1938–1947 | Büyükamiral | Oramiral | Koramiral | Tümamiral | Tuğamiral | Albay | Yarbay | Binbaşı | Yüzbaşı | | Üsteğmen | Teğmen | Asteğmen |
| 1947–1956 |
| 1947–1956 | Büyük amiral | Oramiral | Koramiral | Tümamiral | Tuğamiral | Albay | Yarbay | Binbaşı | Yüzbaşı | | Üsteğmen | Teğmen | Asteğmen |

=== Turkish Naval Forces Other ranks ===
The rank insignia of non-commissioned officers and enlisted personnel.

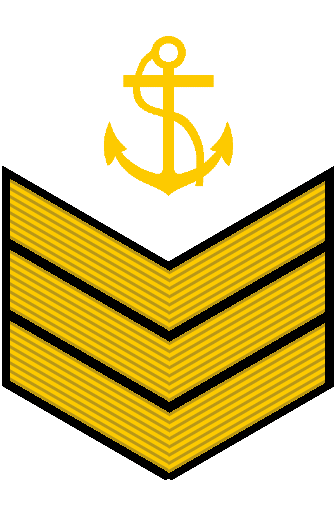
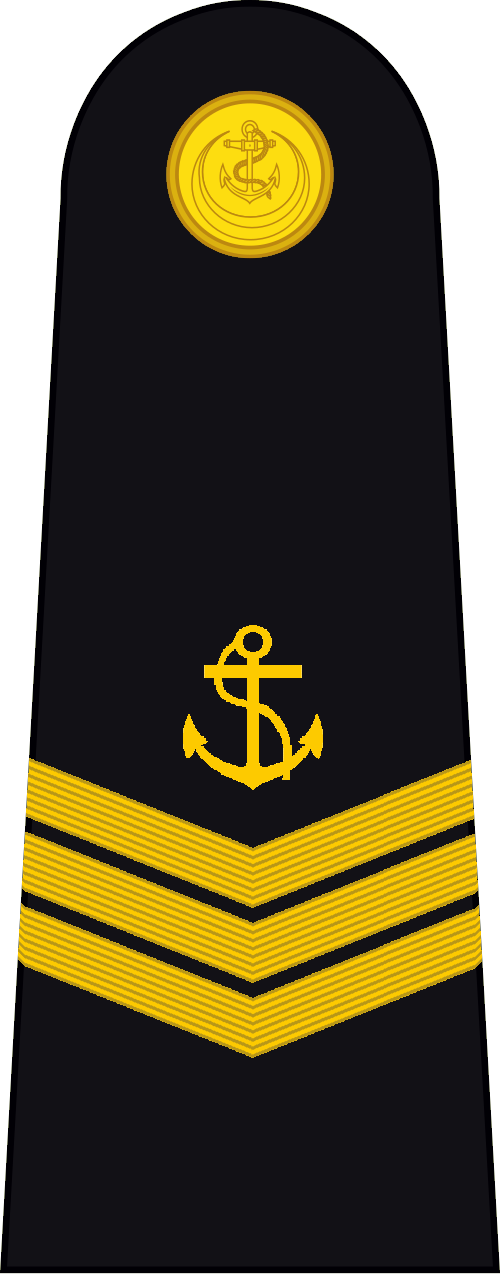
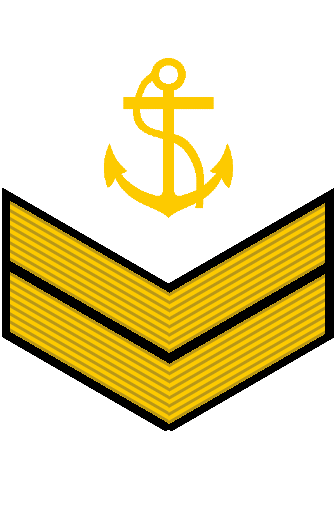
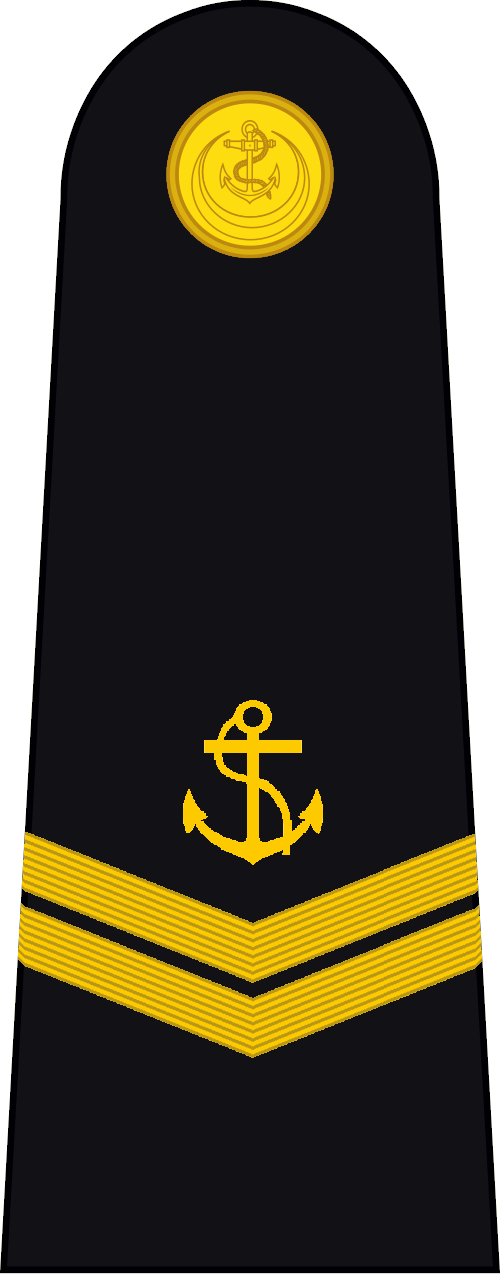
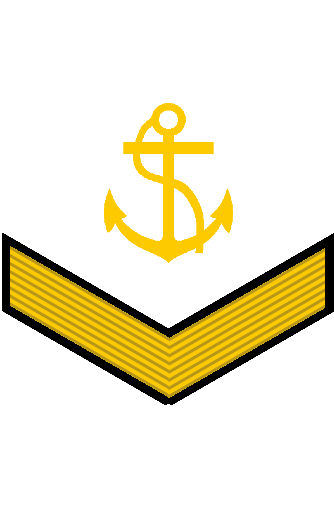
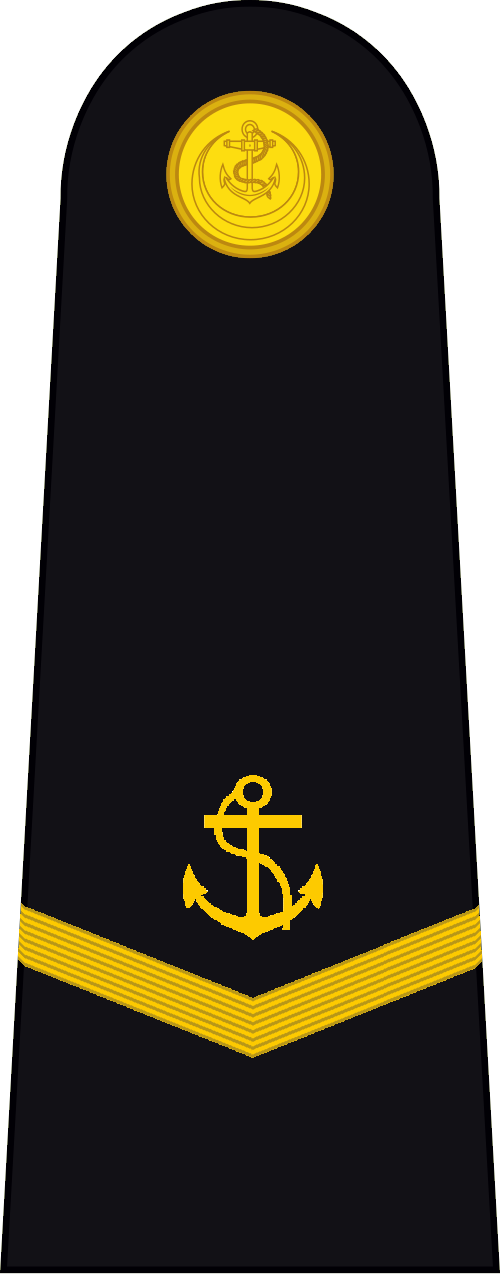
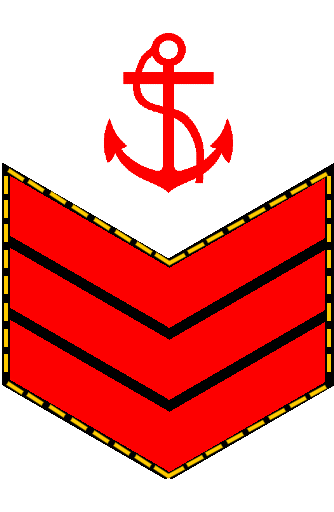
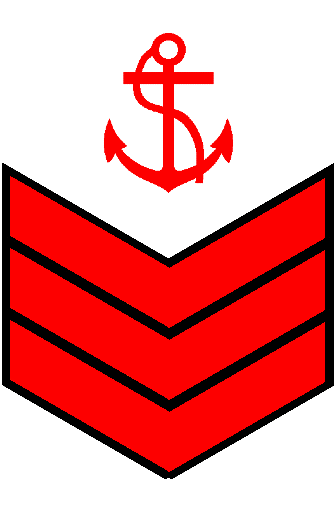
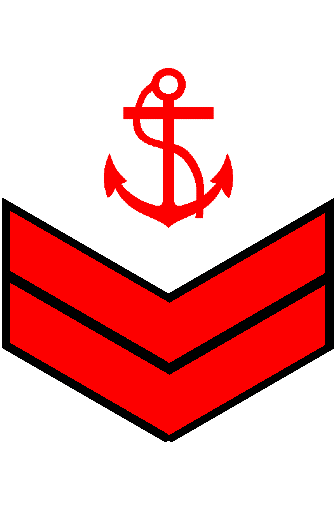
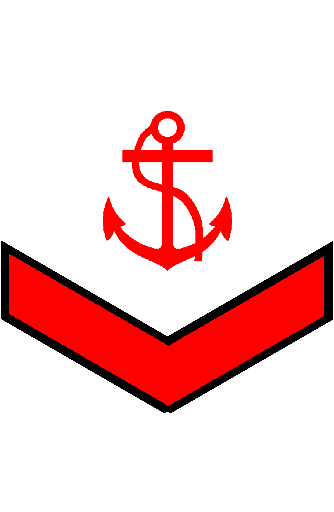
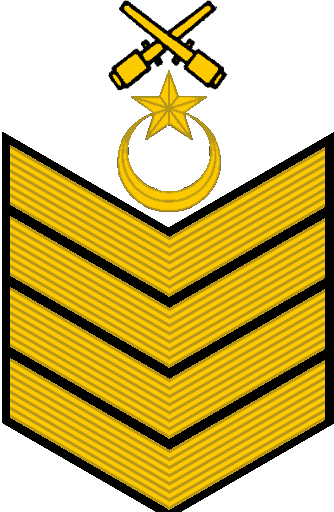
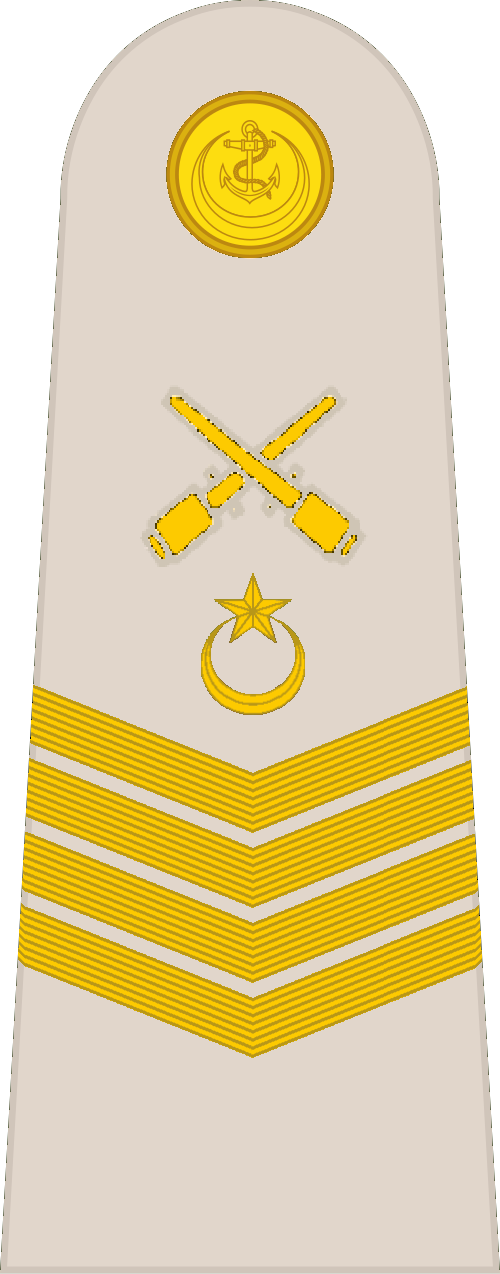
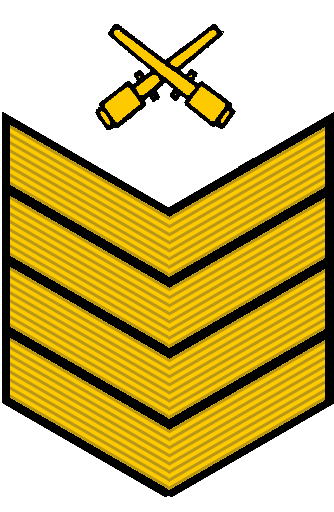
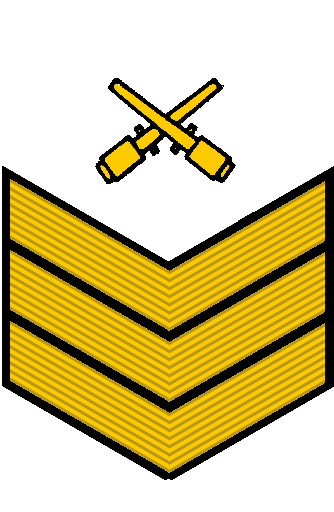
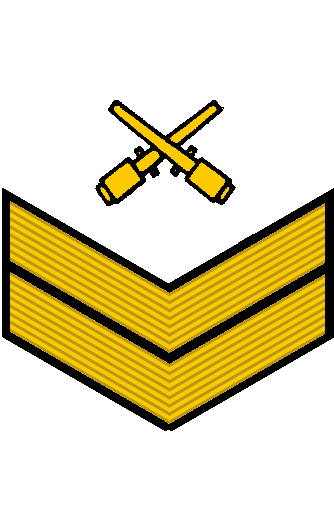
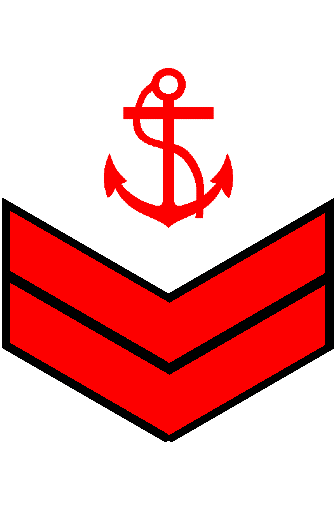
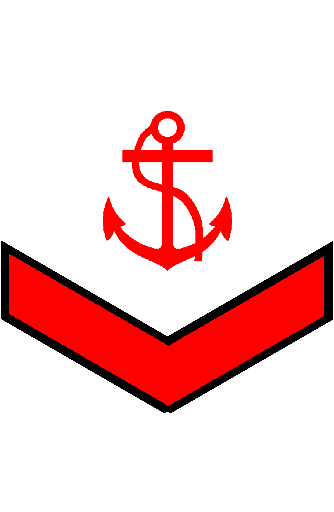
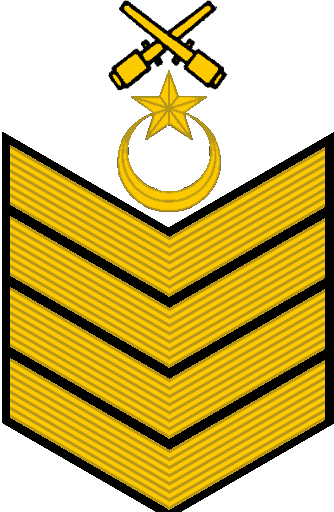
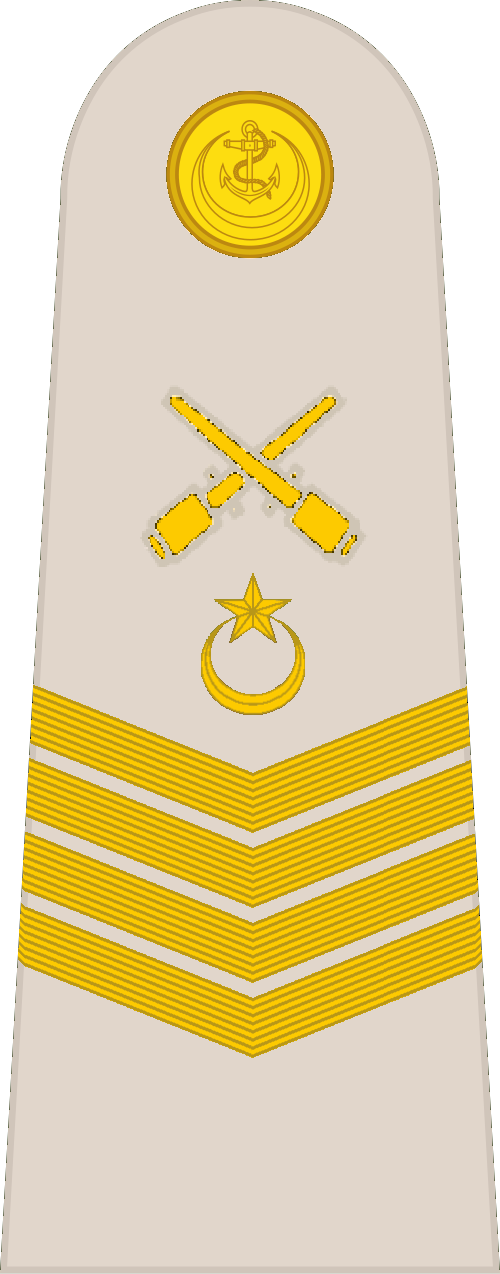
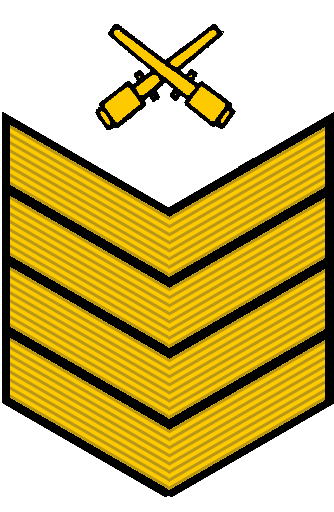
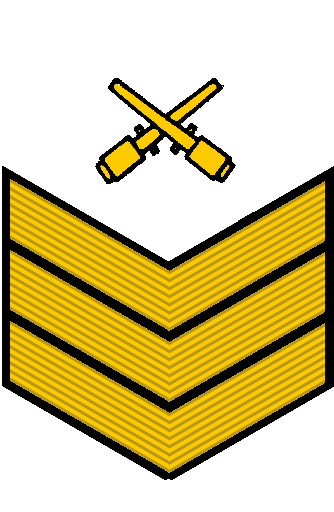
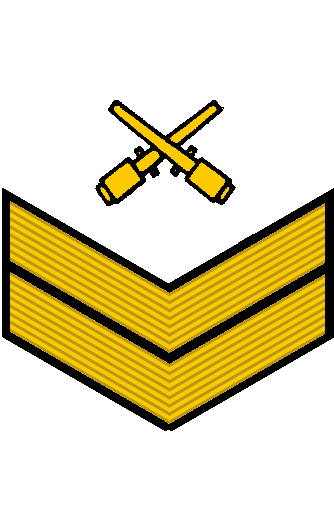
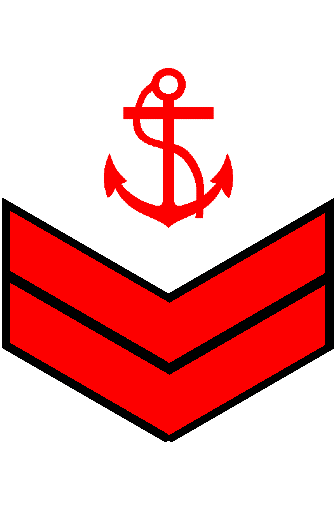
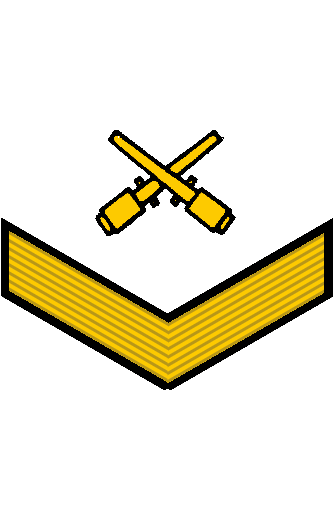
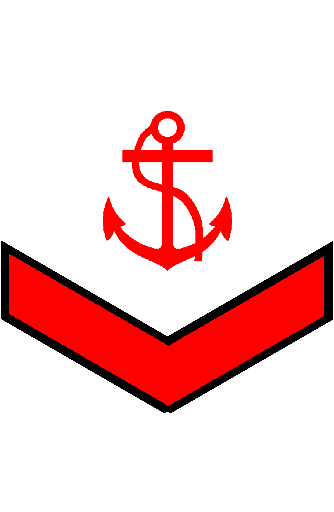
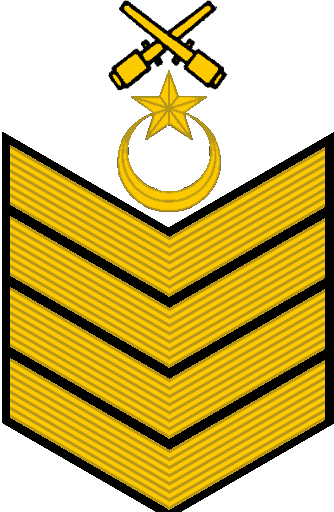
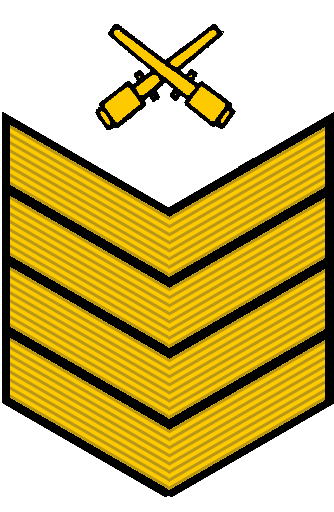
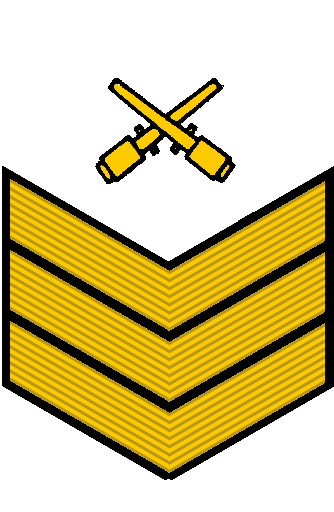
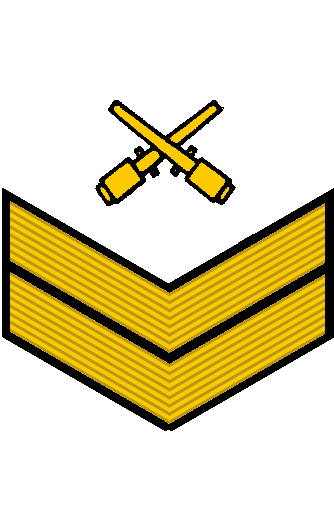
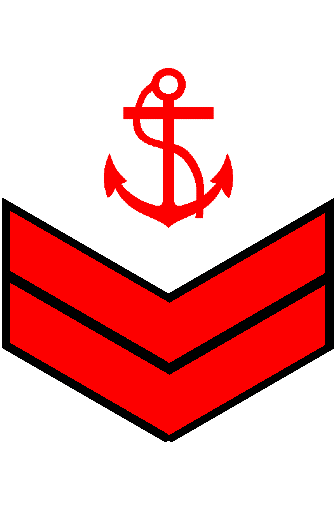
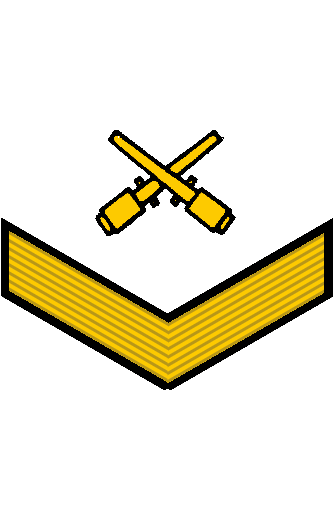
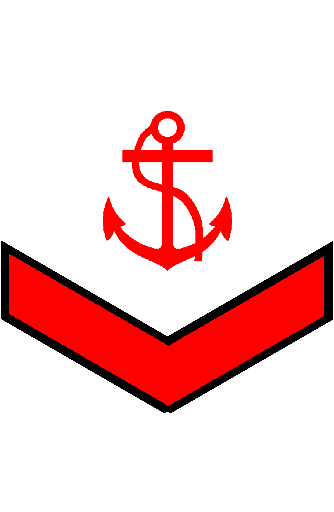
| Rank group | Senior NCOs | | | Junior NCOs | | | | | Enlisted |
|---|---|---|---|---|---|---|---|---|---|---|---|---|---|
| (Turkey) Turkish Naval Forces (1920―1933) | | | | | | | | | | | | | No insignia |
| (Turkey) Turkish Naval Forces (1920―1933) | بیرینجی صنف گدیکلی; Birinci sınıf gedikli (Line) | ایکینجی صنف گدیکلی; İkinci sınıf gedikli (Line) | اوچونجی صنف گدیکلی; Üçüncü sınıf gedikli (Line) | گدیکلی نامزدی; Gedikli namzedi (Line) | | باش چاووش; Başçavuş (Line) | | | چاووش; Çavuş (Line) | | اون باشی; Onbaşı (Line) | | نفر; Nefer |
| (Turkey) Turkish Naval Forces (1933―1942) | | | | | | | | | | | | | No insignia (Note: There were no insignia other than the branch insignia.) |
| (Turkey) Turkish Naval Forces (1933―1942) | | | | | Başgedikli (Gunner) | Gedikli başçavuş (Gunner) | Gedikli üstçavuş (Gunner) | Gedikli çavuş (Gunner) | Çavuş (Line) | | Onbaşı (Line) | | Er |
| (Turkey) Turkish Naval Forces (1942―1947) | | | | | | | | | | | | No insignia (Note: Only the profession badge was worn but in yellow instead of red to differentiate from drafted personnel.) | No insignia (Note: Only the profession badge was worn but in red instead of yellow to differentiate from contracted personnel.) |
| (Turkey) Turkish Naval Forces (1942―1947) | | | | | Astsubay kıdemli başçavuş (Gunner) | Astsubay başçavuş (Gunner) | Astsubay üstçavuş (Gunner) | Astsubay çavuş (Gunner) | Çavuş (Line) | Gedikli onbaşı (Gunner) | Onbaşı (Line) | Gedikli er | Er |
| (Turkey) Turkish Naval Forces (1947―1956) | | | | | | | | | | | | No insignia | No insignia |
| (Turkey) Turkish Naval Forces (1947―1956) | | | | | Astsubay kıdemli başçavuş (Gunner) | Astsubay başçavuş (Gunner) | Astsubay üstçavuş (Gunner) | Astsubay çavuş (Gunner) | Çavuş (Line) | Gedikli onbaşı (Note: 1942-1951) (Gunner) | Onbaşı (Line) | Gedikli er | Er |
| (Turkey) Turkish Naval Forces (1956―1970) | | | | | | | | | | | | | No insignia |
| (Turkey) Turkish Naval Forces (1956―1970) | | | | | Astsubay kıdemli başçavuş (Line) | Astsubay başçavuş (Line) | Astsubay üstçavuş (Line) | Astsubay çavuş (Line) | Çavuş (Line) | | Onbaşı (Submarine) | | Er |

== See also ==
Military ranks of the Ottoman Empire
