= Mareşal (Turkey) =

Highest rank in the Turkish Armed Forces

Marshal Mareşal
- Shoulder insignia
- Country: Turkey
- Service branch: Turkish Land Forces; Turkish Air Force
- NATO rank code: OF-10
- Formation: 1921
- Next higher rank: None
- Next lower rank: Orgeneral
- Equivalent ranks: Büyük amiral

Mareşal (transl. Marshal) is the highest rank in the Turkish Land Forces and Turkish Air Force. It is the equivalent of a field marshal in other countries.

The rank of Mareşal can trace its origins to the Ottoman Empire, where the rank of Mushir (Arabic: مشير) was bestowed upon senior commanders upon order of the ruling Sultan.

The word mariscalcus in Latin, had parts from the old-German words meaning horse and servant.

The rank of Mareşal can only be bestowed by the National Assembly, and only given to a general who leads an army, and/or air force with an extraordinary success in battle gaining a victory over the enemy.

The corresponding rank in the Turkish Navy is Büyük amiral.

== List of Turkish Marshals ==
Only two people were bestowed the rank Mareşal to date, both for their successes in the Turkish War of Independence. General Semih Sancar was offered the rank after the Cyprus Operation in 1974, but he refused.

No.	Portrait	Name (born–died)	Date of promotion	For	Office	Ref.
1		Mustafa Kemal Atatürk (1881–1938)	19 September 1921	Battle of Sakarya	Commander-in-chief of the Army of the GNA (1921–1922)	
2		Fevzi Çakmak (1876–1950)	31 August 1922	Battle of Dumlupınar	Commander-in-chief of the Army of the GNA (1921–1922); Chief of the Turkish General Staff (1923–1944)	

== See also ==
- Military ranks of Turkey
- Military ranks of the Ottoman Empire
- List of field marshals of the Ottoman Empire
