= Admiral of the fleet (Turkey) =

Admiral of the fleet Büyük amiral
- Rank flag

- Shoulder and sleeve insignia
- Country: Turkey
- Service branch: Turkish Navy
- NATO rank code: OF-10
- Formation: 1921
- Next lower rank: Oramiral
- Equivalent ranks: Mareşal

Admiral of the fleet (Turkish: Büyük amiral; lit. 'Grand admiral') is the highest rank in the Turkish Naval Forces. It is the equivalent of an Admiral of the fleet in other countries.

The rank of Admiral of the fleet can trace its origins to the earlier Ottoman Empire, where the rank of Turkish: Kapudan Pasha (Ottoman Turkish: قپودان پاشا) was bestowed upon senior commanders upon order of the head of state in the ruling Sultan.

The rank can only be bestowed by the National Assembly, and only given to a general who leads a navy with an extraordinary success in battle gaining a victory over the enemy. The rank has never been awarded.

The corresponding rank in the Turkish Land Forces and Turkish Air Force is Turkish: Mareşal.

== See also ==
- Military ranks of Turkey
- Military ranks of the Ottoman Empire
