= Military ranks of the Ottoman Empire =

The military ranks of the Ottoman Empire may be visually identified by the military insignia used during the Military of the Ottoman Empire.

== Army ==
=== Classic Army ===
- Aghas were commanders of the different branches of the military services, like "azap agha", "besli agha", "janissary agha", for the commanders of azaps, beslis, and janissaries, respectively. This designation was given to commanders of smaller military units, too, for instance the "bölük agha", and the "ocak agha", the commanders of a "bölük" (company) and an "ocak" (troops) respectively.
- Boluk-bashi was a commander of a "bölük", equivalent with the rank of captain.
- Chorbaji (Turkish for "soup server") was a commander of an orta (regiment), approximately corresponding to the rank of colonel (Turkish: Albay) today. In seafaring, the term was in use for the boss of a ship's crew, a role similar to that of boatswain.

=== Modern Army ===
Military personnel in the Ottoman Empire were assigned different duties according to their capabilities in order to administer the Armed Forces and particularly to be successful in battle. They were given various ranks so that they could conduct relations with each other and be fully aware of their duties. The issue of what sort of duties should be allocated to which unit or to which military institution used to be determined by the ranking within the Armed Forces. In Islamic countries, certain 'degrees', instead of ranks, were given in accordance with the categorization of government duties. In the course of time, these 'degrees' had taken on certain characteristics.

In the Ottoman Empire, besides the ranks that were awarded after passing through certain stages of promotion, there was also the honorific style of "Pasha" that was given directly by the Ottoman Sultan. This style, which continued until the establishment of the Republic of Turkey, was also given to civilian administrators who were approved of and found suitable. Around 1900, all General Officers ranks had long been entitled to the style of "Pasha". Colonels and some Lieutenant Colonels, as well as some majors, were referred to as "Beys"; some Lieutenant Colonels and some Majors, as well as all captains, bore the title "Effendi". Lieutenants held the title "Agha".

After the establishment of the Republic, the Sultanate was abolished, and the title "Pasha" became synonymous with the General rank, restricted to the Armed Forces only. Paymaster of a regiment - Captain of the Right Wing (Alay Emini - Sağ Kolağası): The rank of the Captain of the Right Wing was very high. The rank of the Adjutant and Paymaster of a regiment was also high but such individuals were not from the military class and they dealt with clerical duties and equipment needed by the regiment. Captain of the Wing - The Captain of the Left Wing- (Kolağası - Sol Kolağası): Captain of the Wing or the Captain of the Left Wing was the senior Captain. If he was educated in the regiment, he was called "Ağa" but if he was the son of a pasha, he was called "Bey".

==== Commissioned officer ranks ====
The rank insignia of commissioned officers.

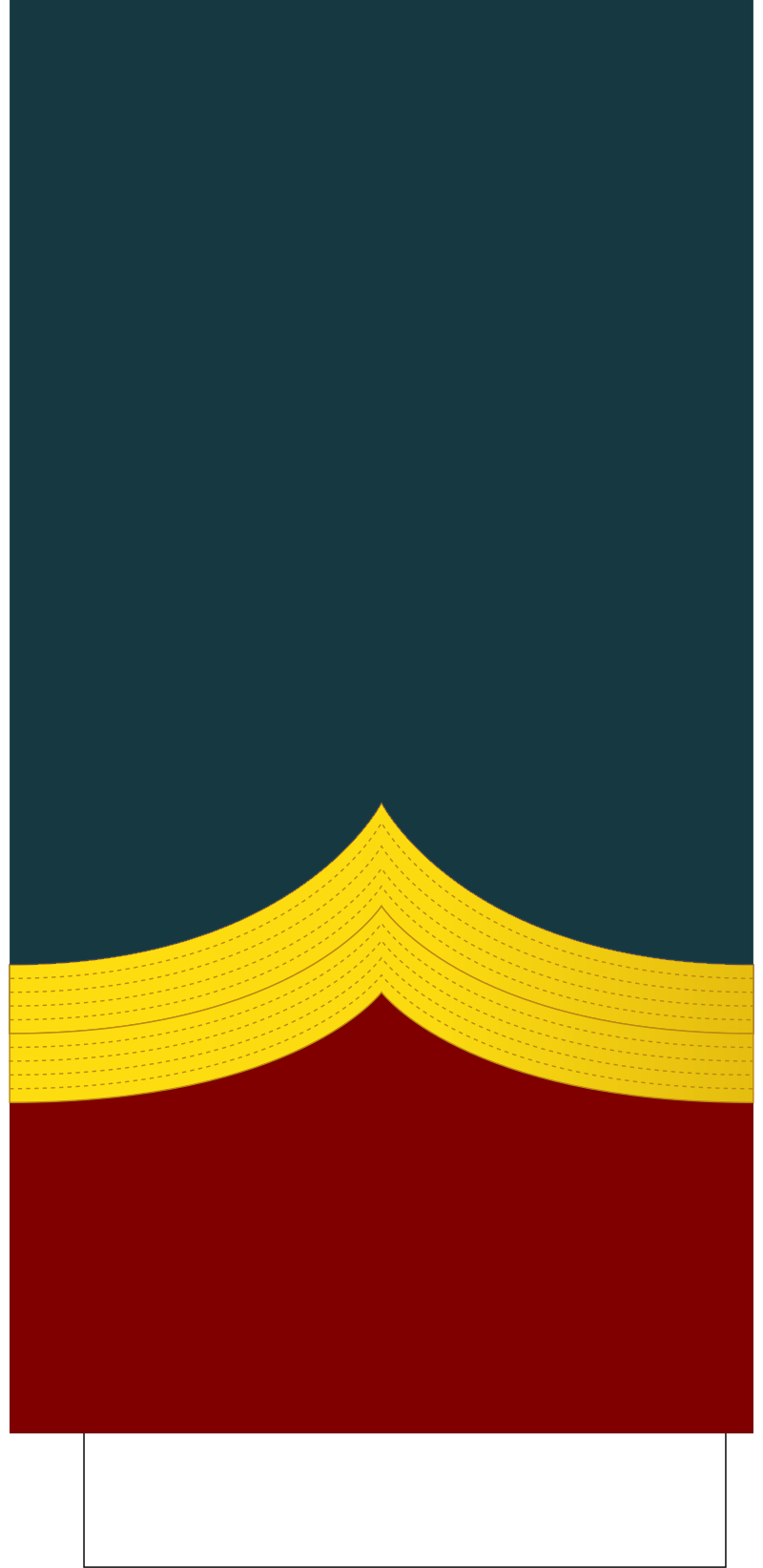
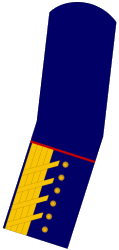
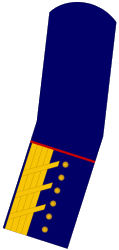
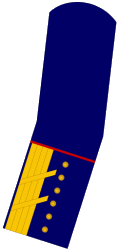
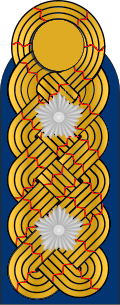
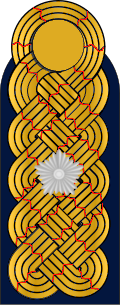
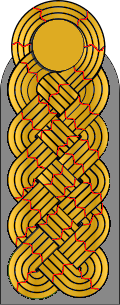
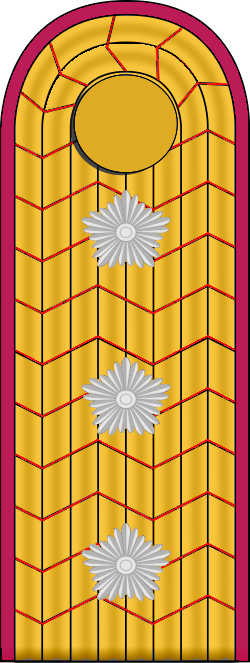
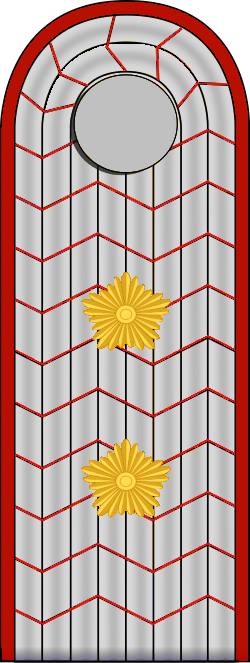
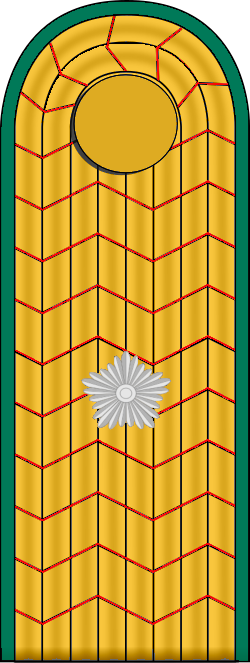
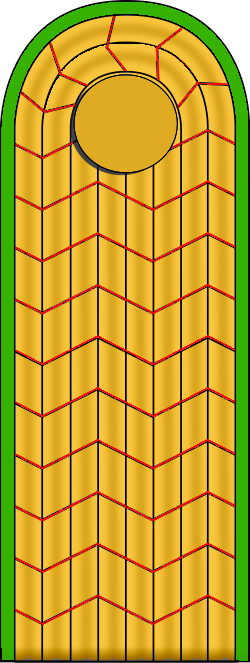
Rank group	General / flag officers				Senior officers			Junior officers
1827–1856 (Note: Worn on the collar.)
1827–1856	مشير; Müşîr	فريق; Ferîk		ميرلواء; Mirliva	ميرالاي; Miralay	قايمقام; Kaymakam	بن باشي; Binbaşı	كول اغاسي; Kolağası	يوزباشي; Yüzbaşı	ملاظم; Mülâzım
1856–1876 (Note: Insignia kept until 1909 for the following: Imperial Entourage, Aides-de-Camp of His Majesty the Sultan, Imperial Guard Units, the Gendarmerie, the Dragoon Regiment, the Fire Brigade Regiment, the Rifle Company and the 1. Army.)
1856–1876	مشير; Müşîr	فريق; Ferîk		ميرلواء; Mirliva	ميرالاي; Miralay	قايمقام; Kaymakam	بن باشي; Binbaşı	كول اغاسي; Kolağası	يوزباشي; Yüzbaşı	ملاظم اول; Mülâzım-ı evvel	ملاظم ثاني; Mülâzım-ı sânî
1876–1909
1876–1909	مشير; Müşîr	فريق; Ferîk		ميرلواء; Mirliva	ميرالاي; Miralay	قايمقام; Kaymakam	بن باشي; Binbaşı	كول اغاسي; Kolağası	يوزباشي; Yüzbaşı	ملاظم اول; Mülâzım-ı evvel	ملاظم ثاني; Mülâzım-ı sânî
1909–1922
1909–1922	مشير; Müşîr	فريق اول; Ferîk-i evvel	فريق; Ferîk	ميرلواء; Mirliva	ميرالاي; Miralay (Combat engineer)	قايمقام; Kaymakam (Artillery)	بن باشي; Binbaşı (Cavalry)	كول اغاسي; Kolağası (Note: Rank discontinued in 1910.) (General staff)	يوزباشي; Yüzbaşı (Medical)	ملاظم اول; Mülâzım-ı evvel (Infantry)	ملاظم ثاني; Mülâzım-ı sânî (Machine guns)
Rank group	General / flag officers				Senior officers			Junior officers

==== Other ranks ====
The rank insignia of non-commissioned officers and enlisted personnel.

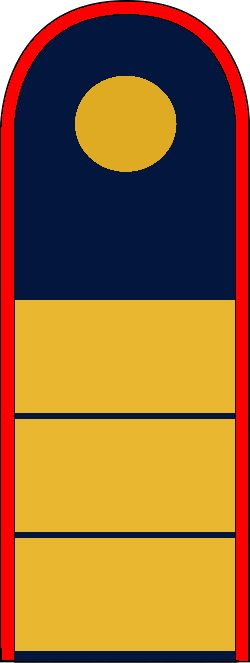
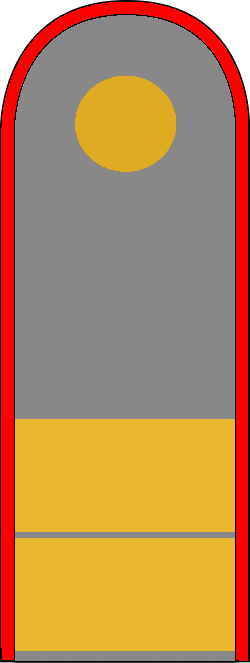
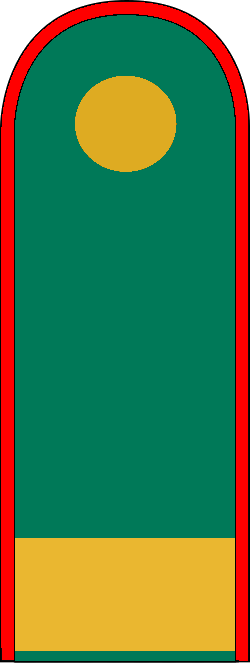
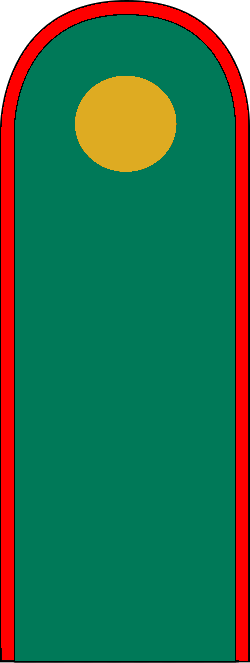
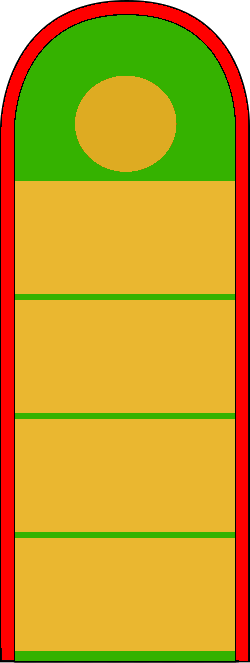
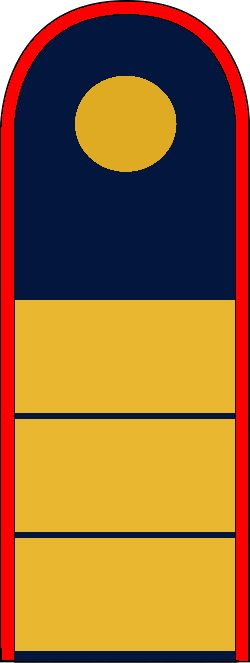
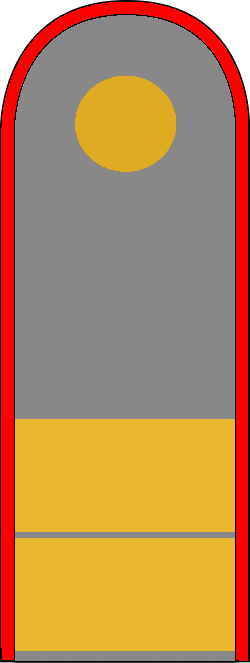
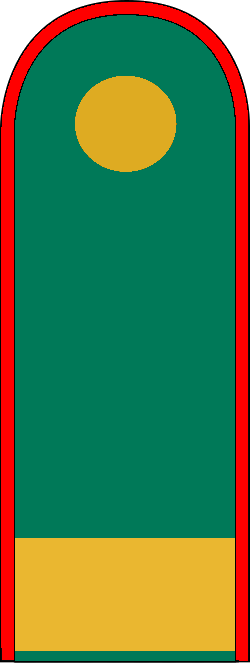
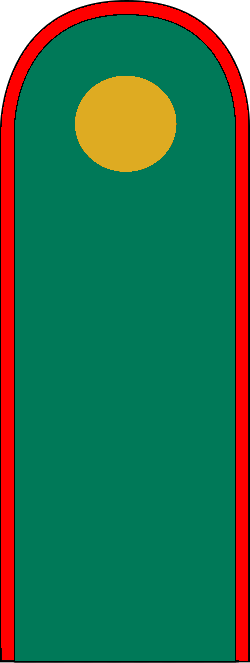
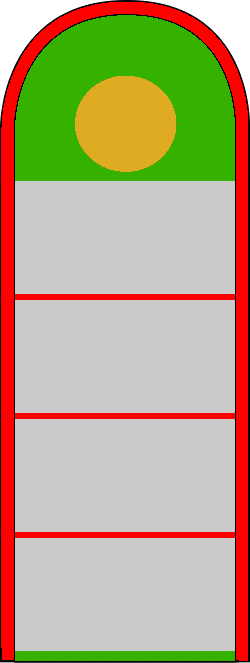
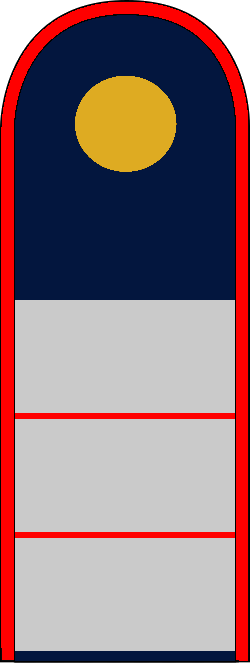
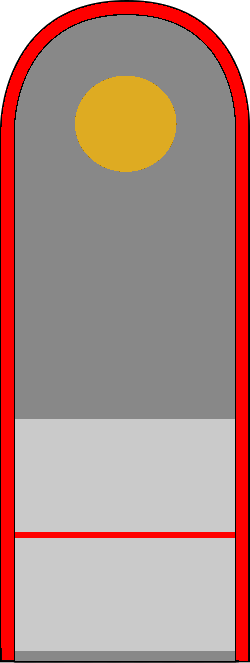
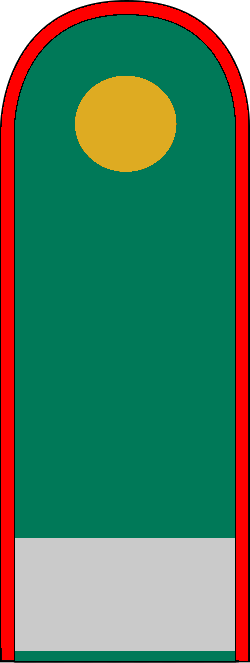
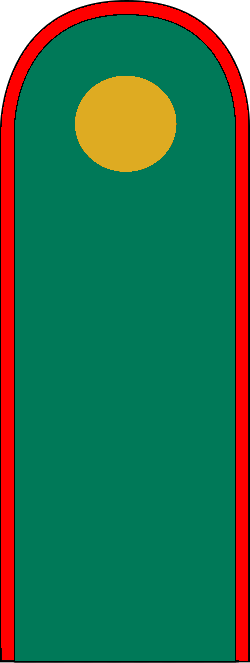
Rank group	Non-commissioned officers				Enlisted
1827–1856							No insignia
1827–1856				چاووش; Çavuş	سنققدار; Sancaktar	اون باشي; Onbaşı	نفر; Nefer
1856–1876 (Note: Only worn on the left sleeve.)							No insignia
1856–1876		باش چاووش; Başçavuş (Universal)		چاووش; Çavuş (Artillery)	بلوك اميني; Bölük emini (Infantry)	اون باشي; Onbaşı (Chasseur)	نفر; Nefer
1876–1911							No insignia
1876–1911		باش چاووش; Başçavuş (Infantry)		چاووش; Çavuş (Rifleman)	بلوک امینی; Bölük emini (Combat engineer)	اون باشی; Onbaşı (Infantry)	نفر; Nefer
1911–1916							No insignia
1911–1916		باش چاووش; Başçavuş (Artillery)	باش چاووش معینی; Başçavuş muavini (Cavalry)	چاووش; Çavuş (Infantry)		اون باشی; Onbaşı (Infantry)	نفر; Nefer
1916–1916							No insignia
1916–1916	تاکم باشی; Takımbaşı (Machine Guns)	باش چاووش; Başçavuş (Artillery)	باش چاووش معینی; Başçavuş muavini (Cavalry)	چاووش; Çavuş (Infantry)		اون باشی; Onbaşı (Infantry)	نفر; Nefer
1916–1922							No insignia
1916–1922	تاکم باشی; Takımbaşı (Machine guns)	باش چاوش; Başçavuş (Artillery)	باش چاوش معینی; Başçavuş muavini (Cavalry)	چاوش; Çavuş (Infantry)		اون باشی; Onbaşı (Infantry)	نفر; Nefer

=== Gendarmerie ===
Other ranks

Rank group	Non-commissioned officers		Enlisted
Ottoman Gendarmerie
1876–1911; Gendarmerie in the Capital					No insignia
1876–1911; Gendarmerie in the Capital	باش چاوش; Başçavuş (Mounted)	چاووش; Çavuş (Foot)	بلوک امینی; Bölük emini (Mounted)	اون باشی; Onbaşı (Foot)	نفر; Nefer
1876–1911; Gendarmerie in the Provinces					No insignia
1876–1911; Gendarmerie in the Provinces	باش چاوش; Başçavuş (Foot)	چاووش; Çavuş (Foot)	بلوک امینی; Bölük emini (Mounted)	اون باشی; Onbaşı (Mounted)	نفر; Nefer
1911–1913					No insignia
1911–1913	باش چاوش; Başçavuş	چاوش; Çavuş		اون باشی; Onbaşı	نفر; Nefer
1913–1914					No insignia
1913–1914	باش چاوش; Başçavuş	چاوش; Çavuş		اون باشی; Onbaşı	نفر; Nefer
1914–1922					No insignia
1914–1922	باش چاوش; Başçavuş	چاوش; Çavuş		اون باشی; Onbaşı	نفر; Nefer
Rank group	Non-commissioned officers		Enlisted

== Navy ==
=== Commissioned officer ranks ===
The rank insignia of commissioned officers.

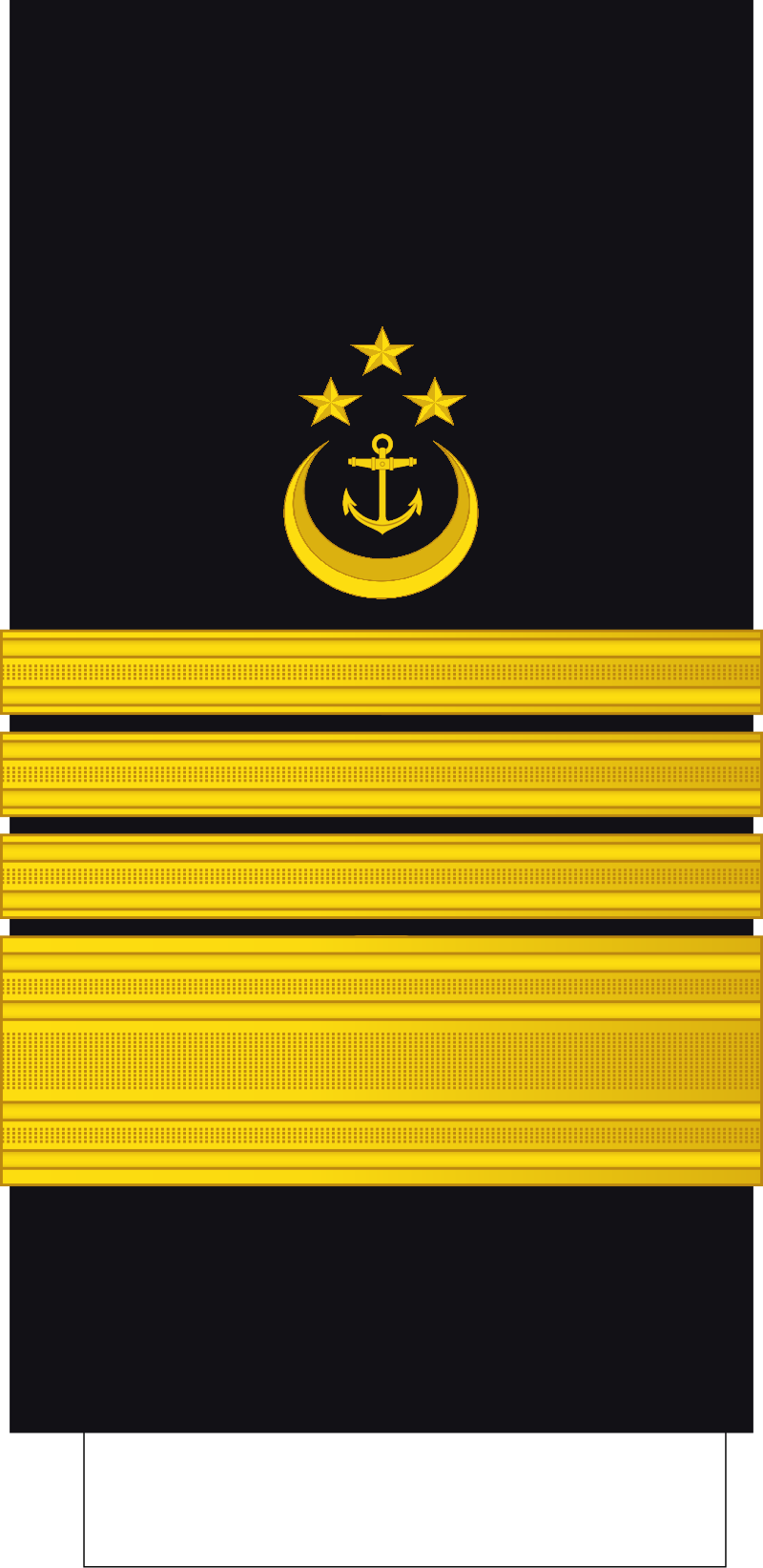
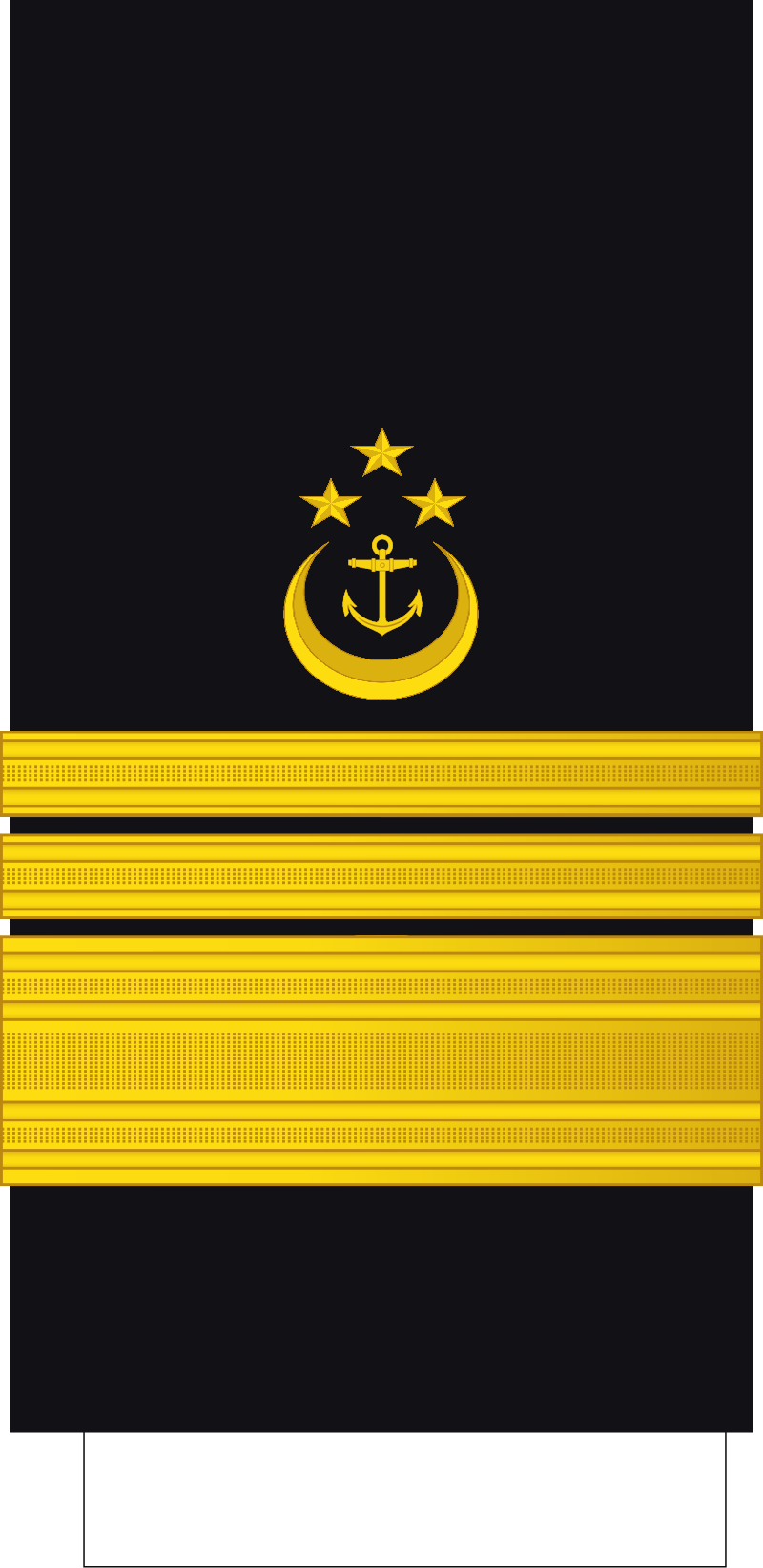
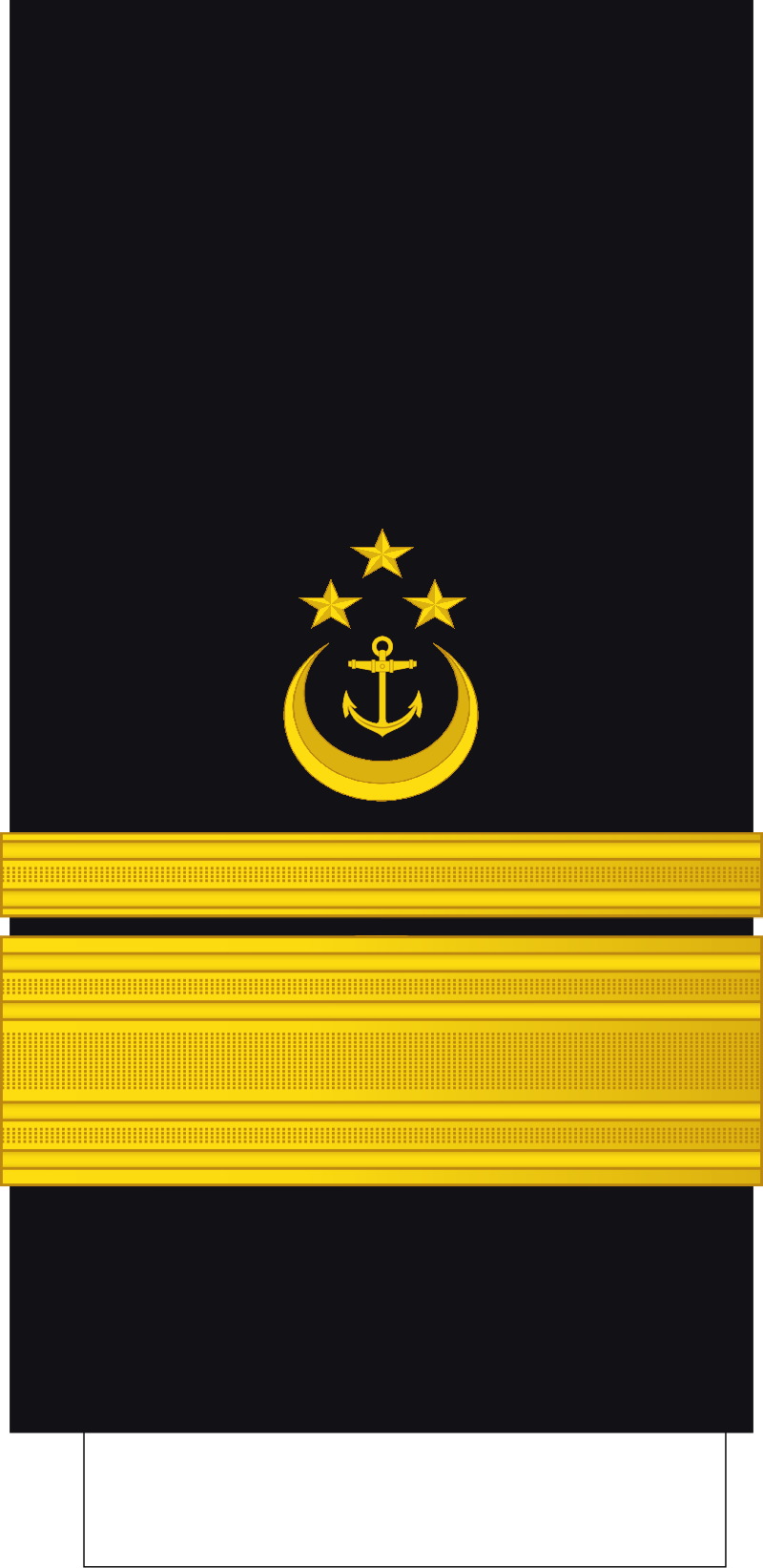
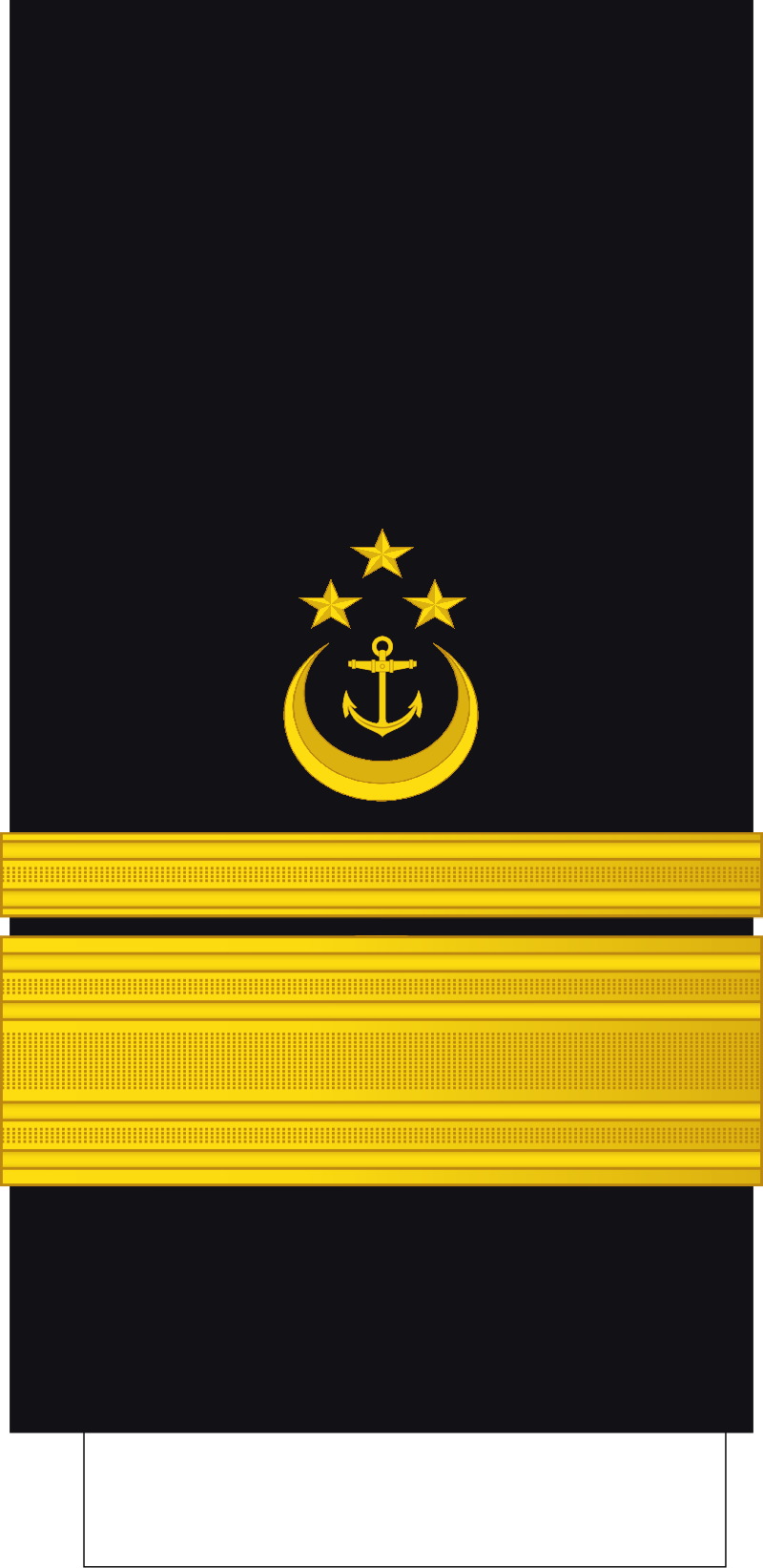
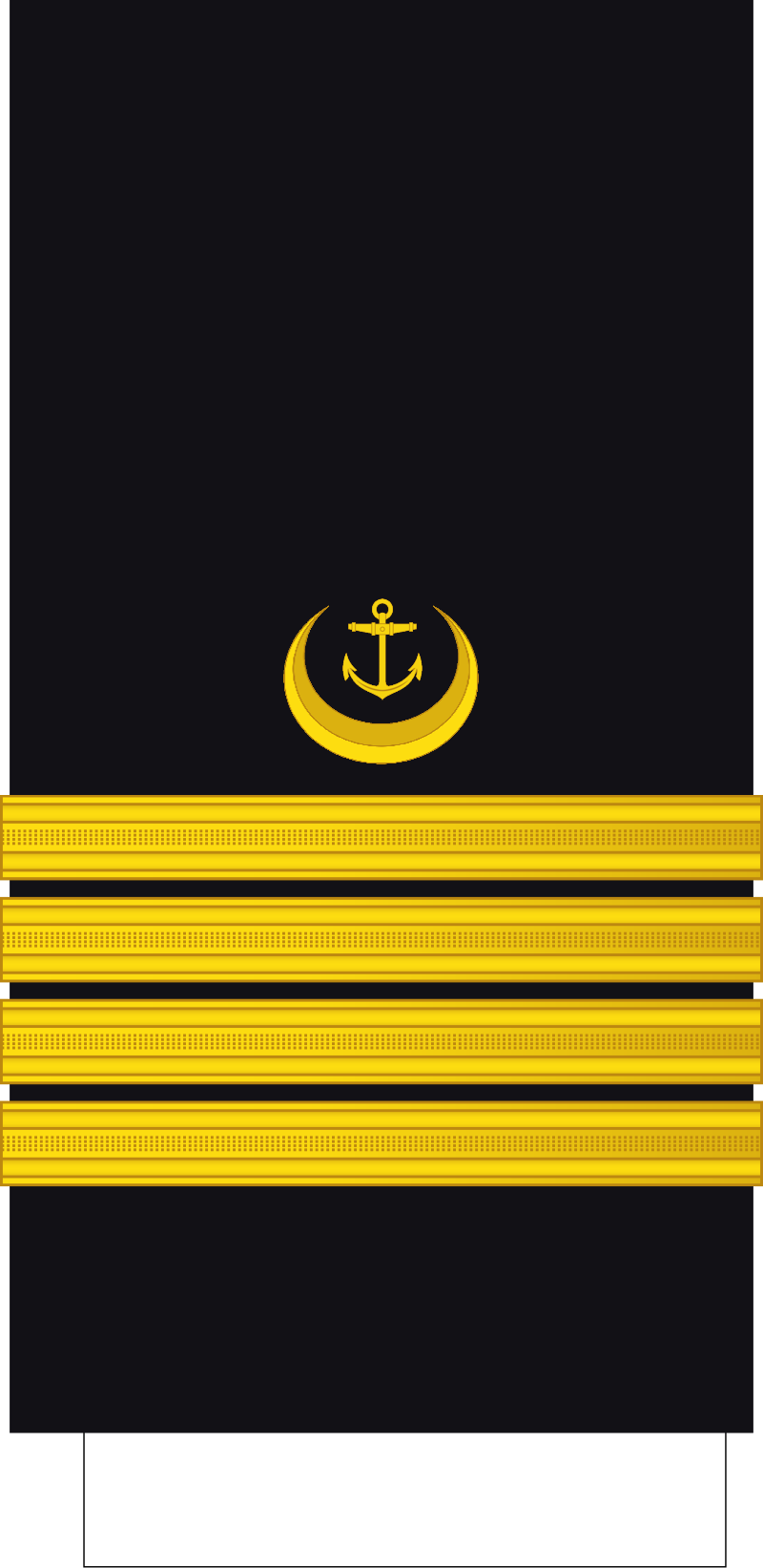
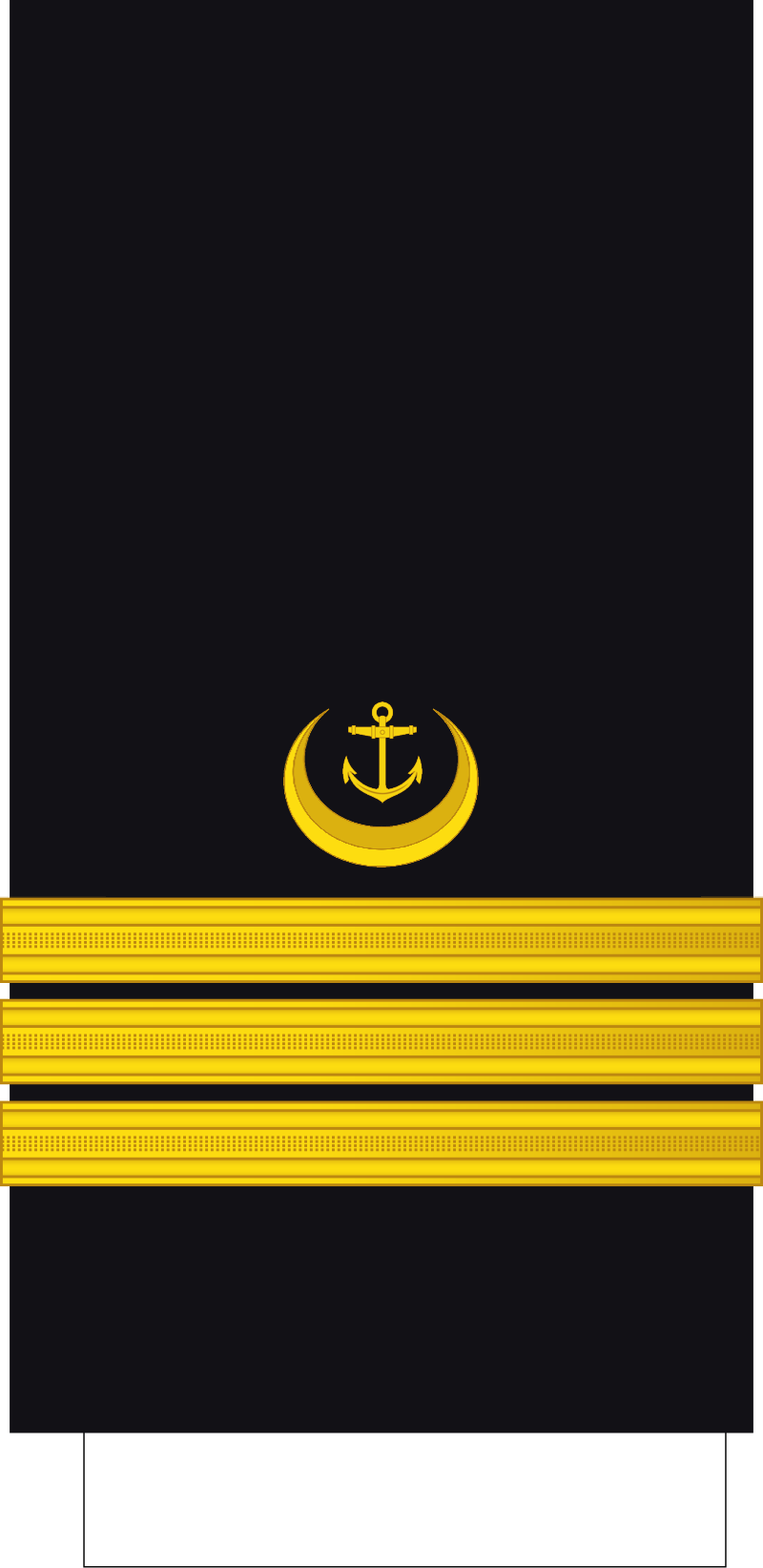
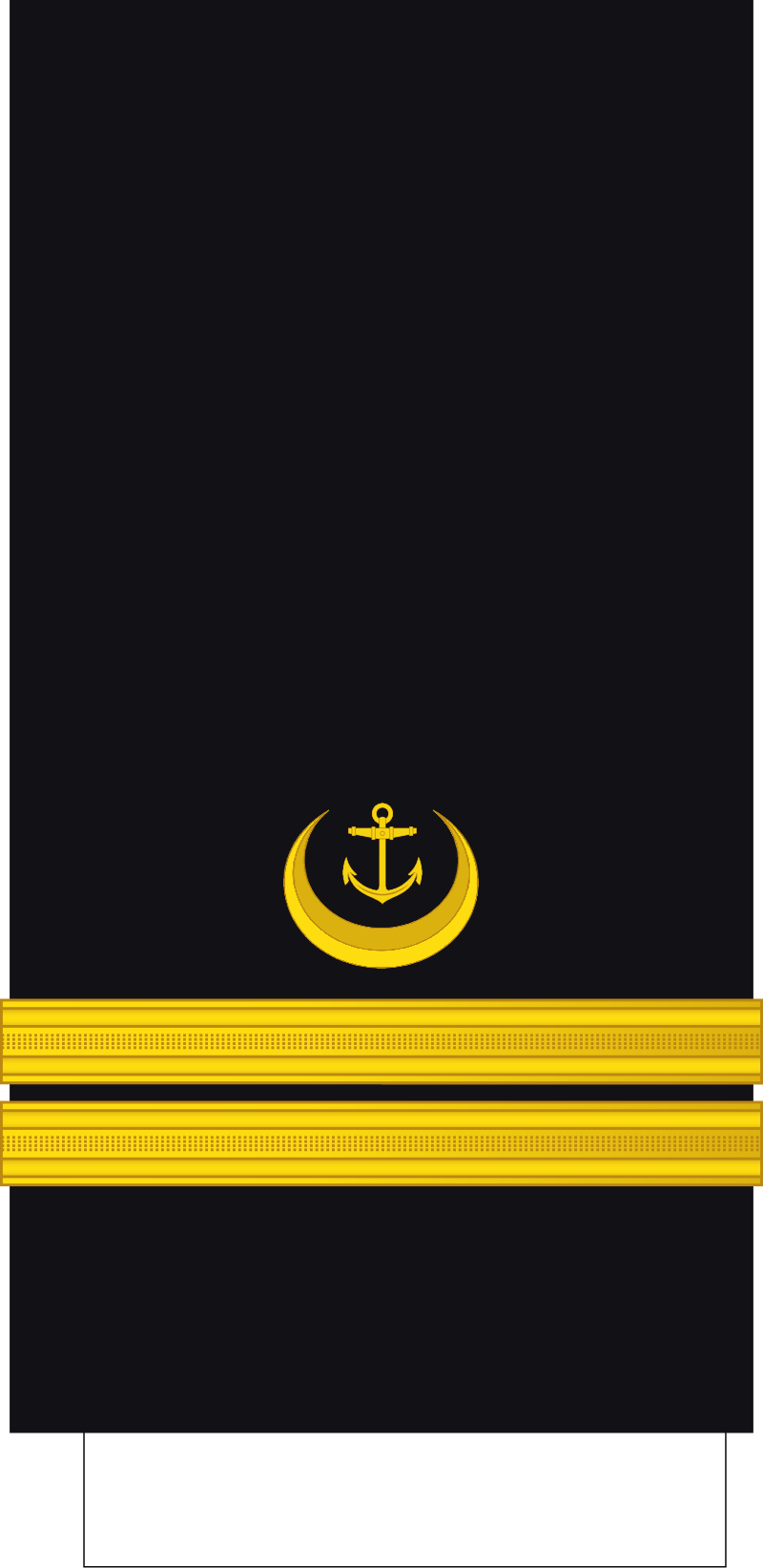
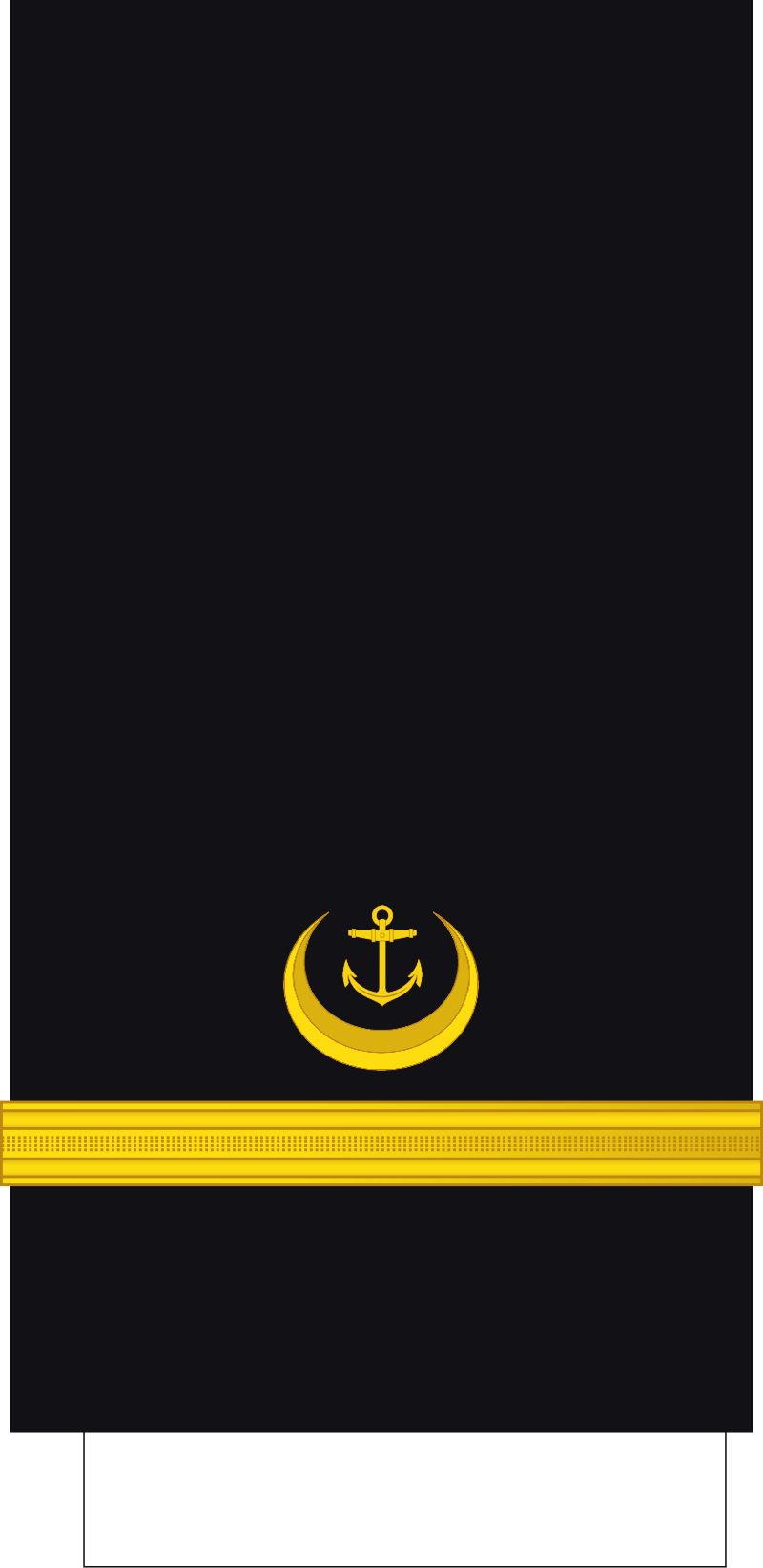
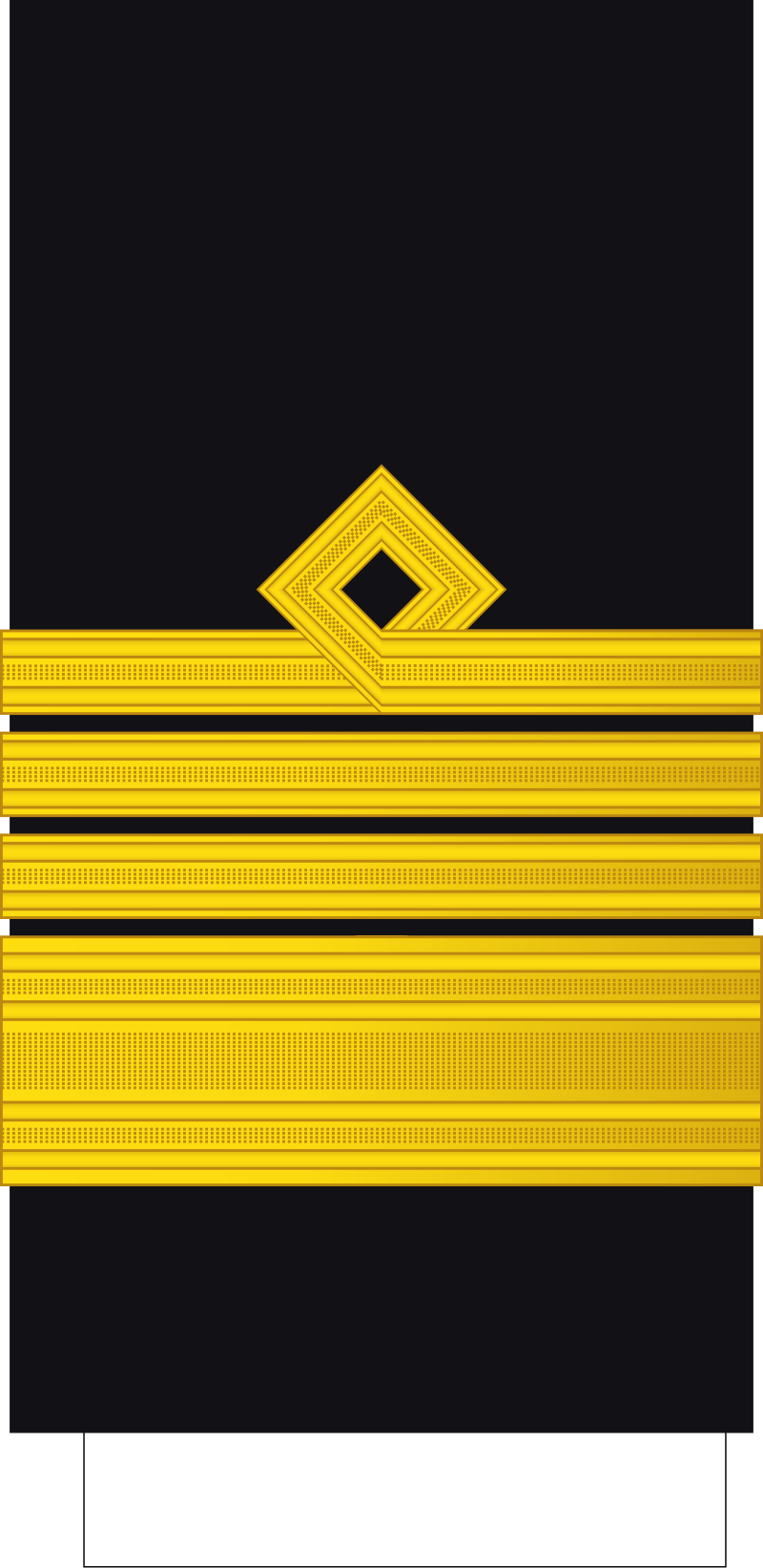
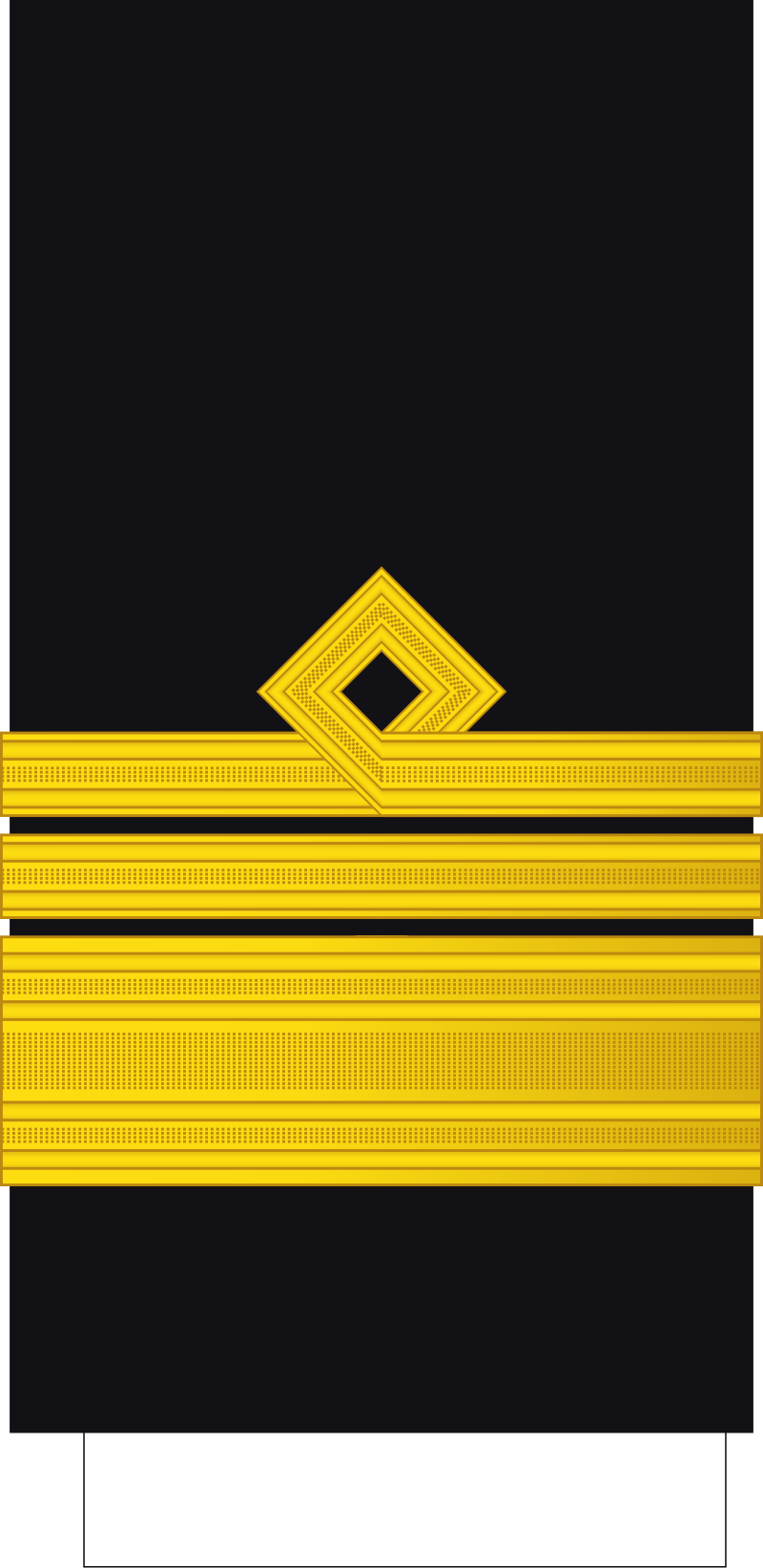
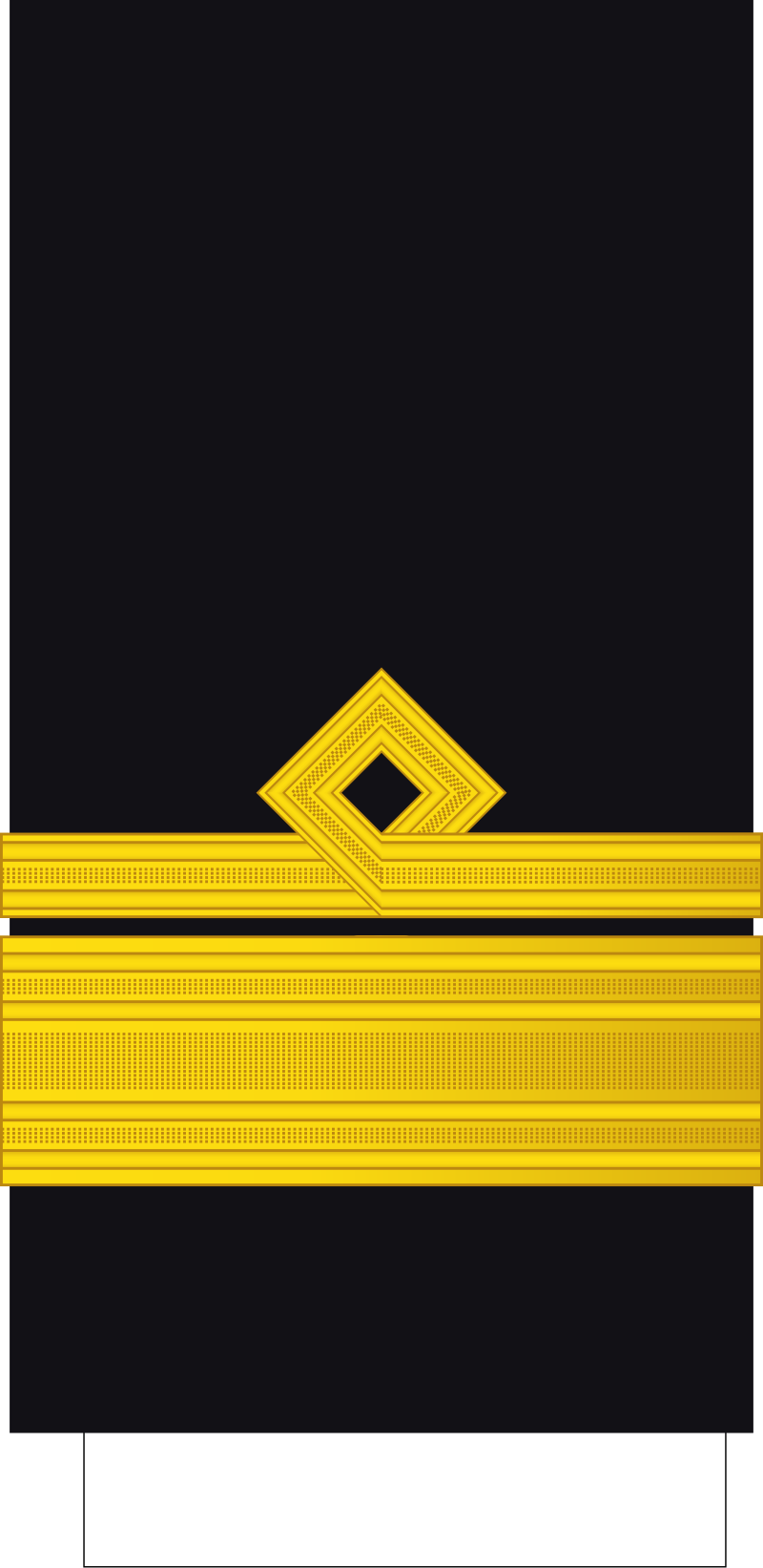
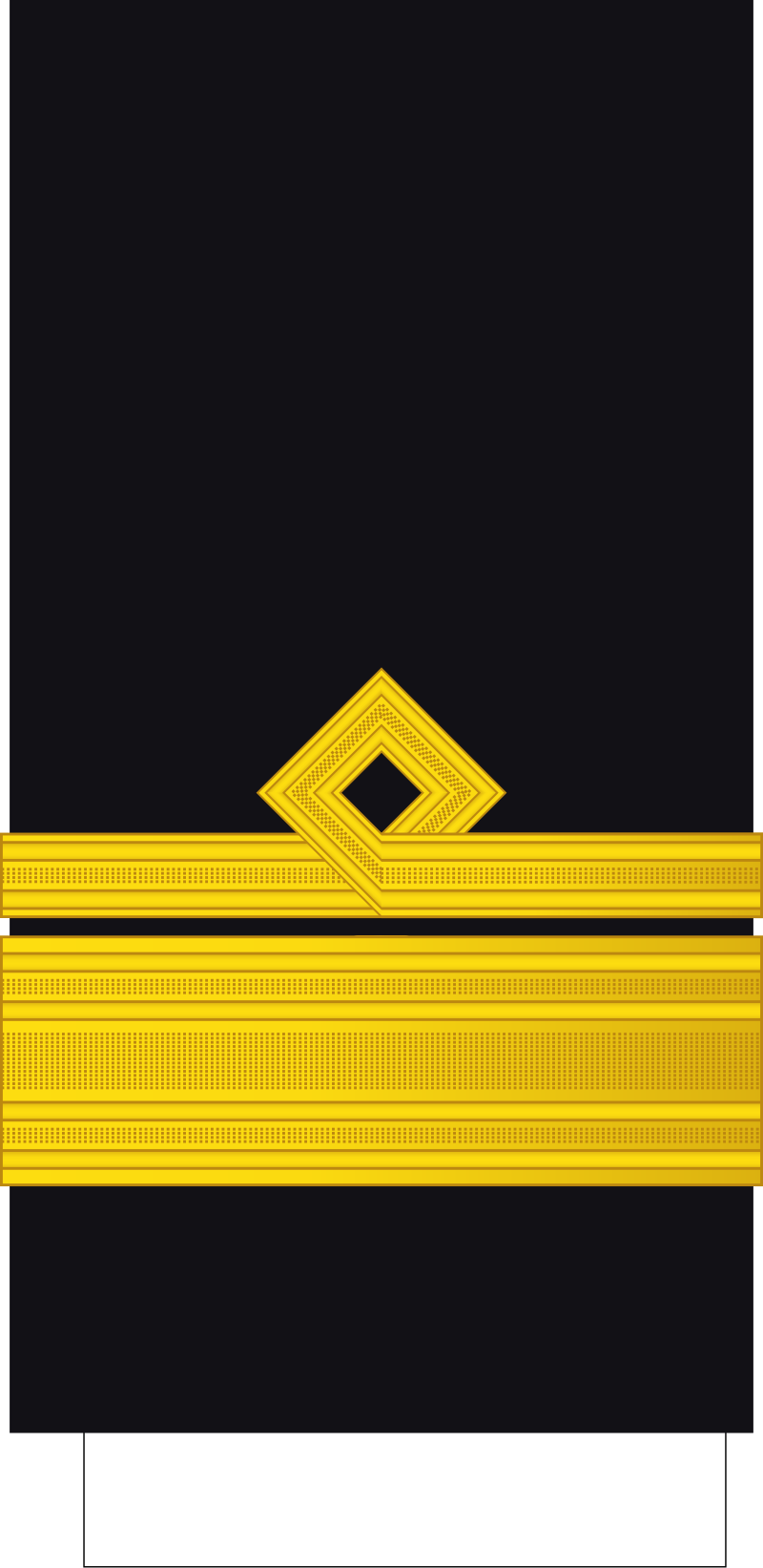
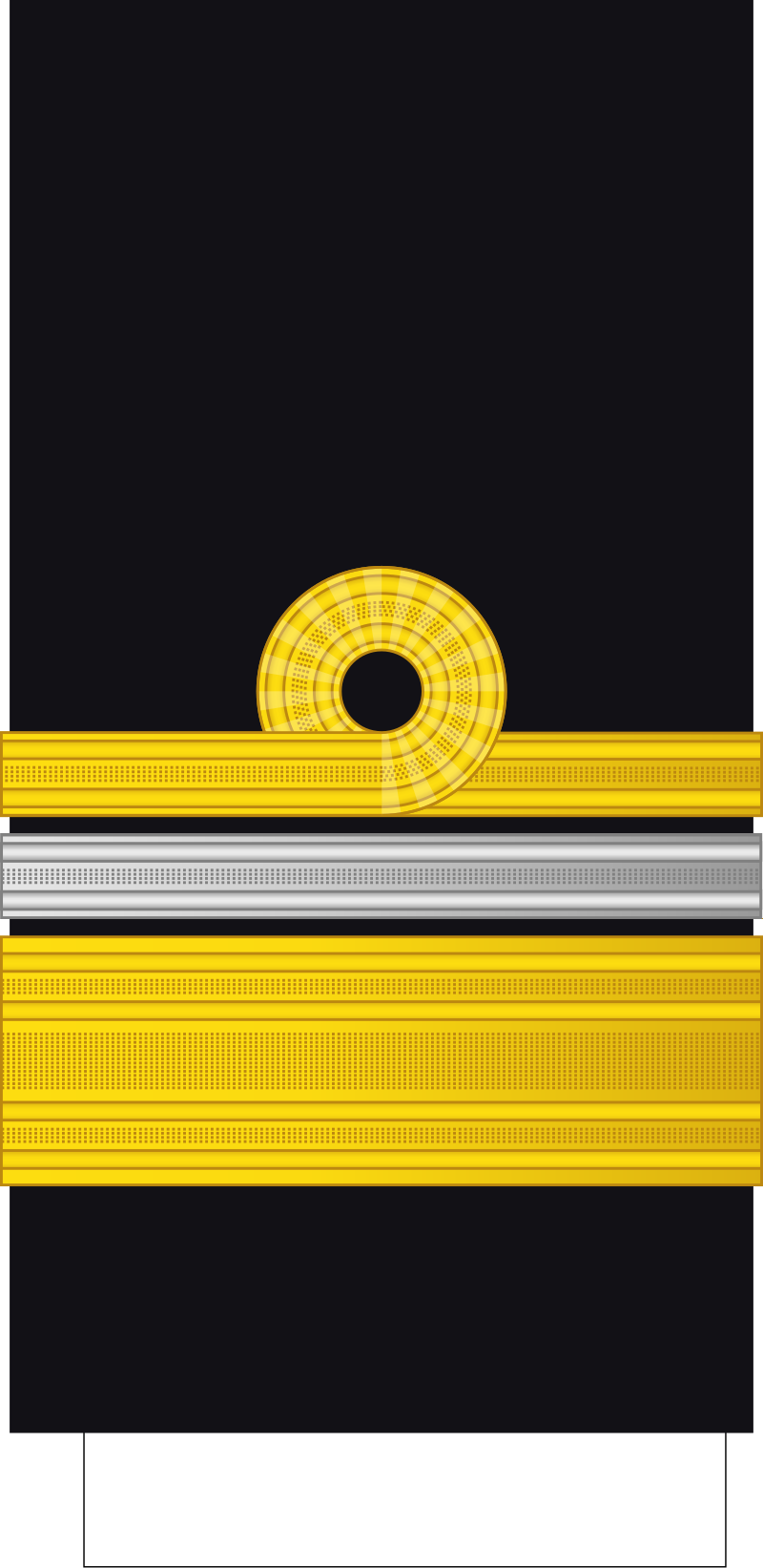
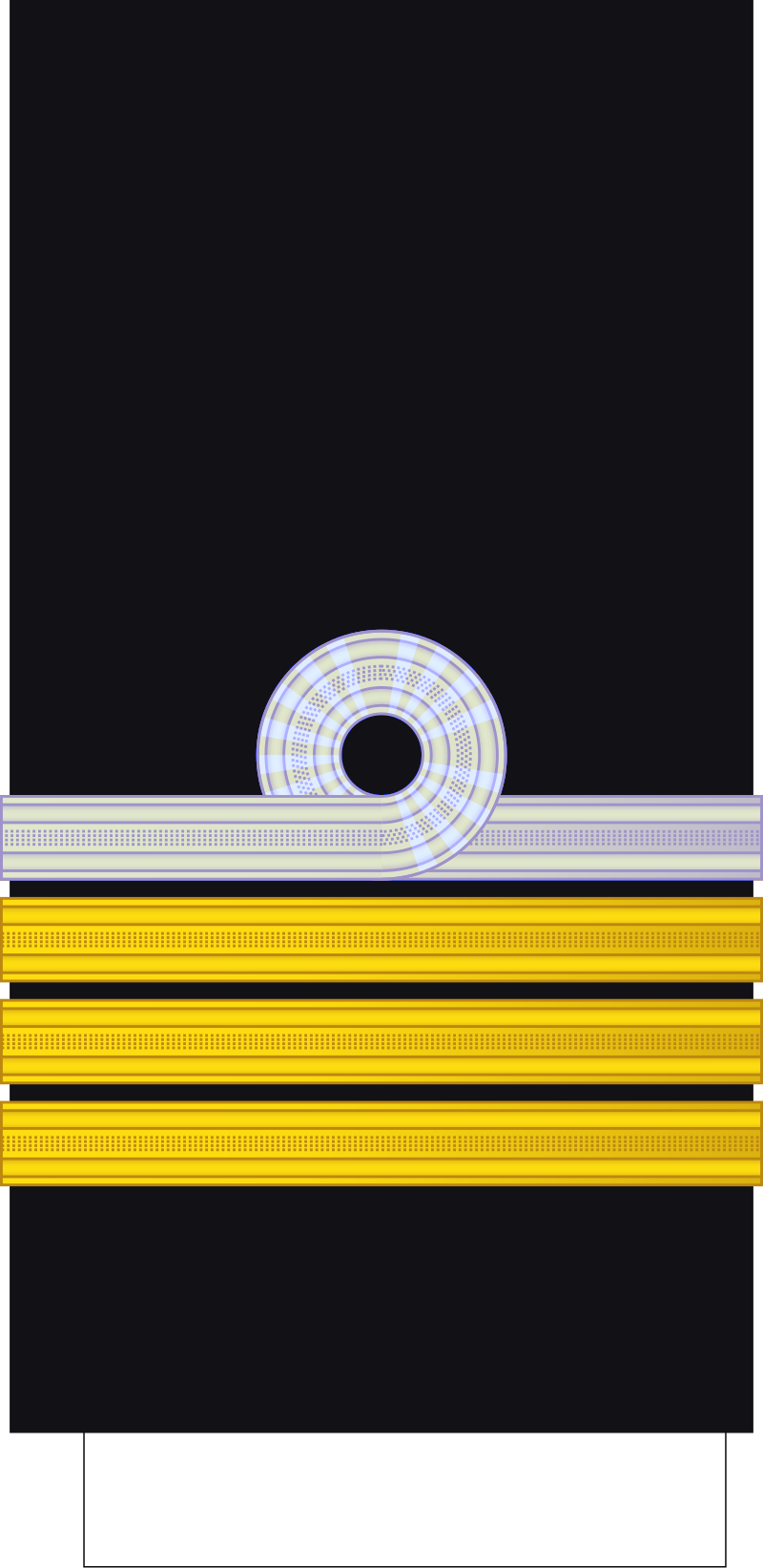
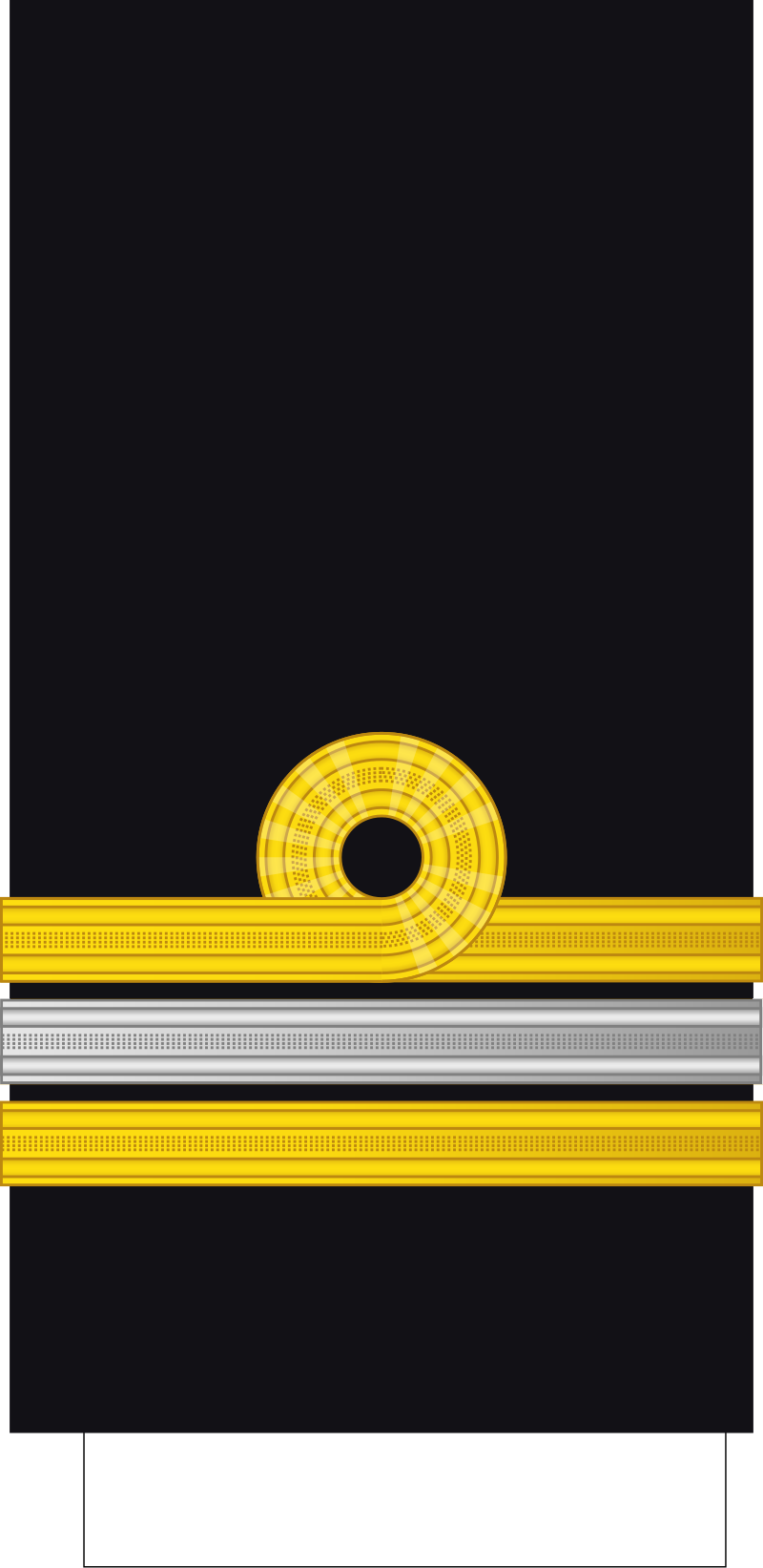
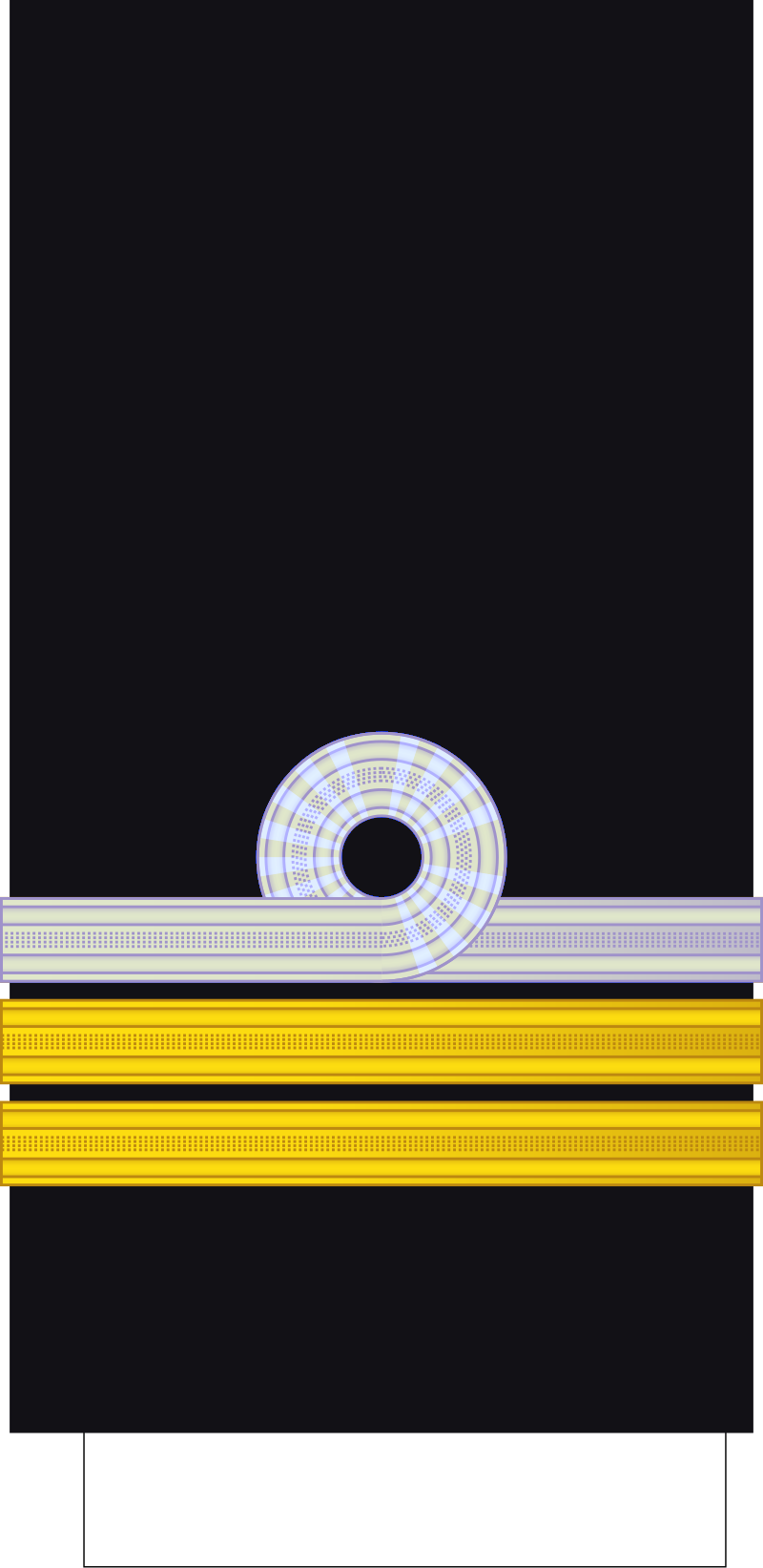
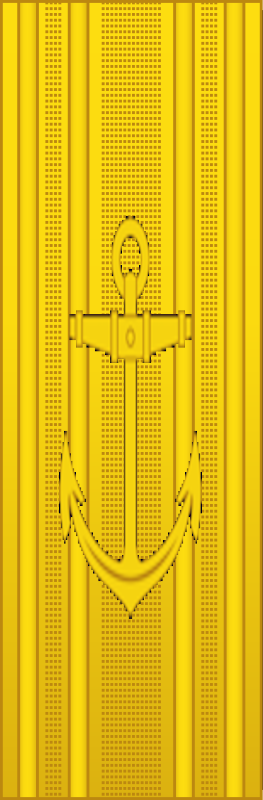
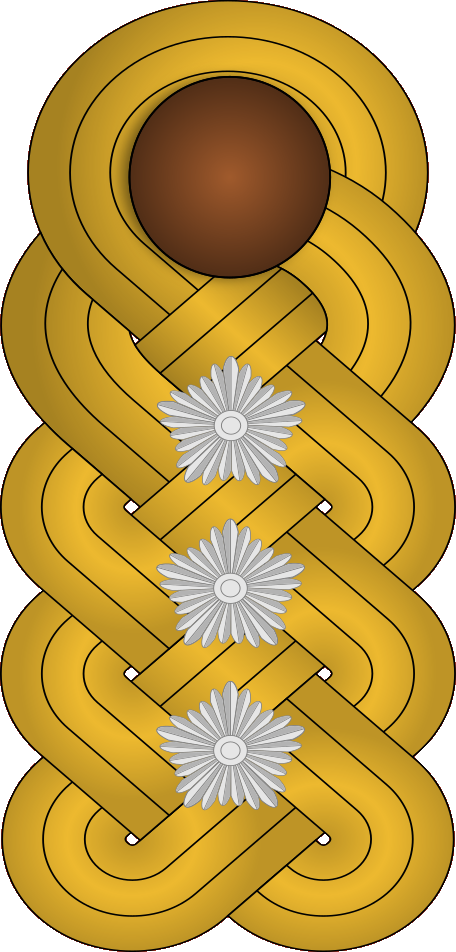
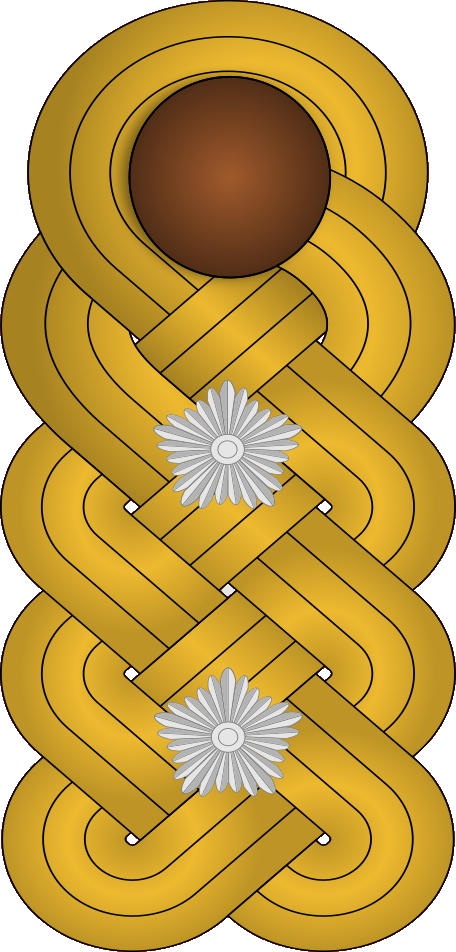
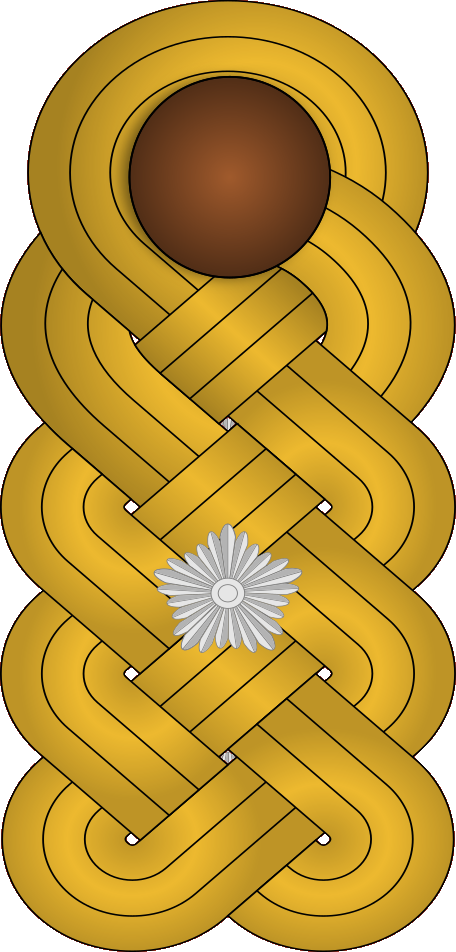
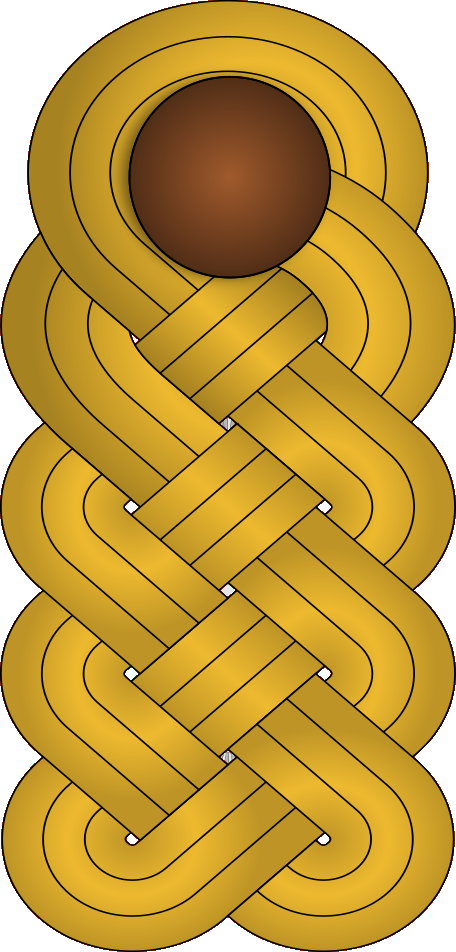
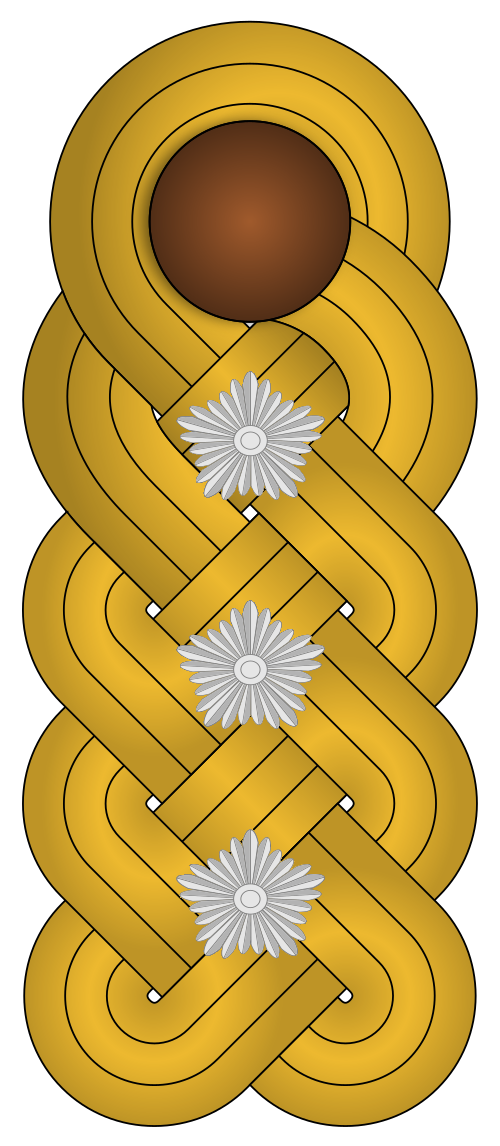
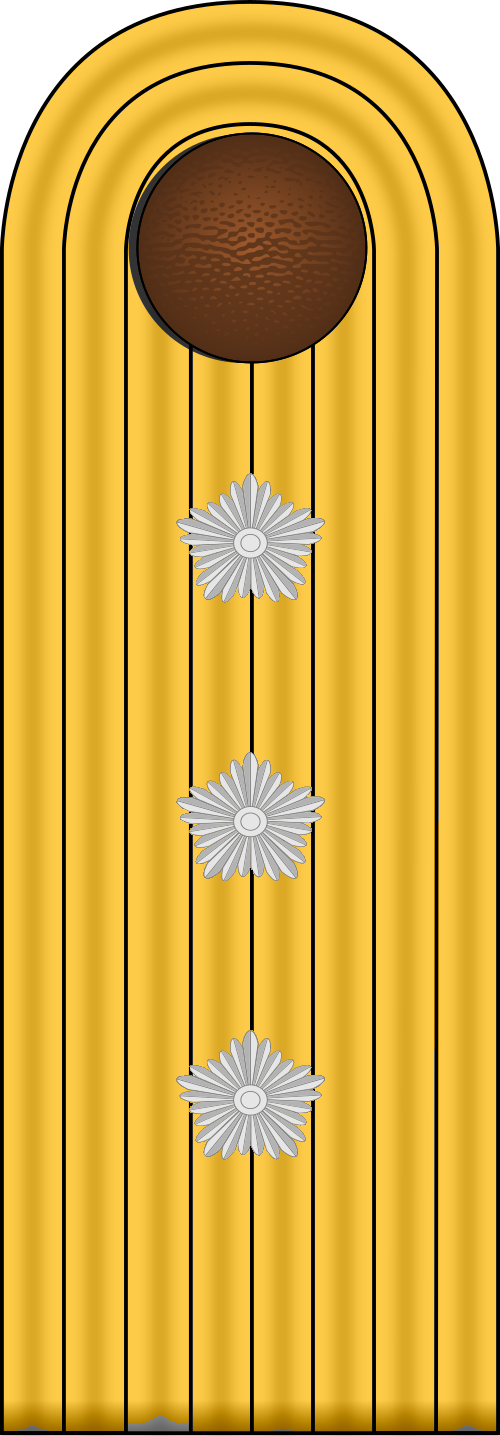
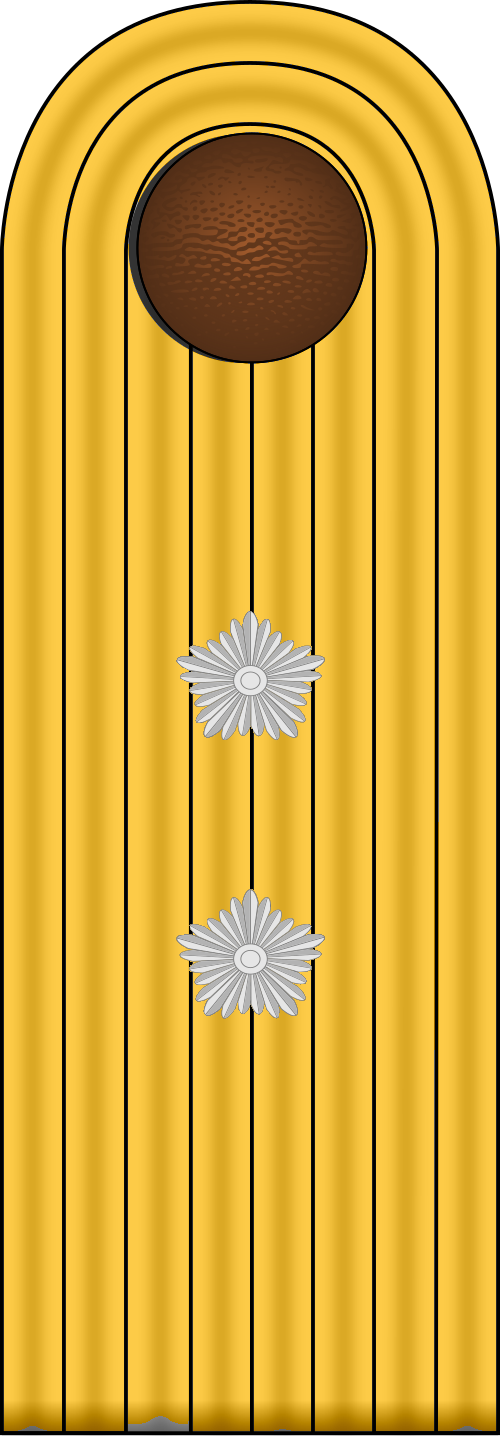
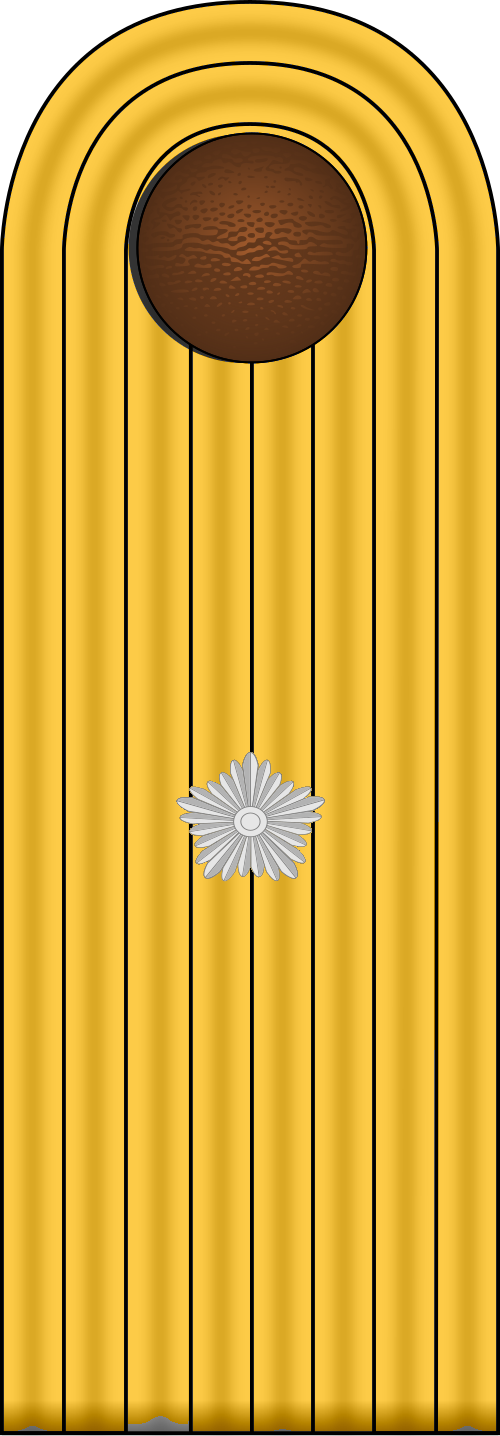
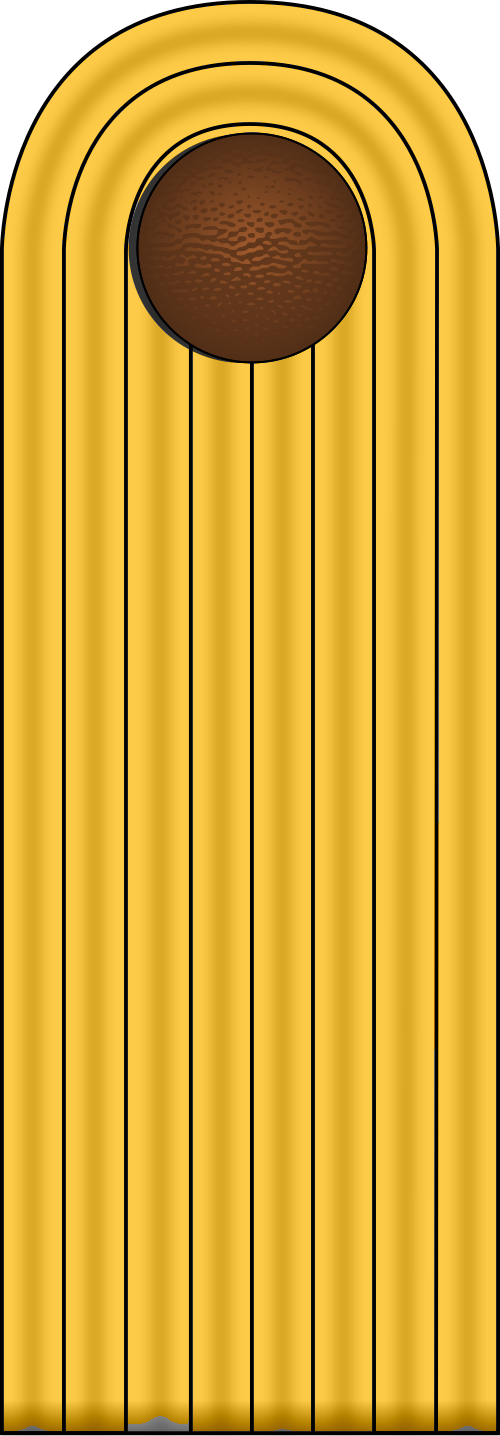
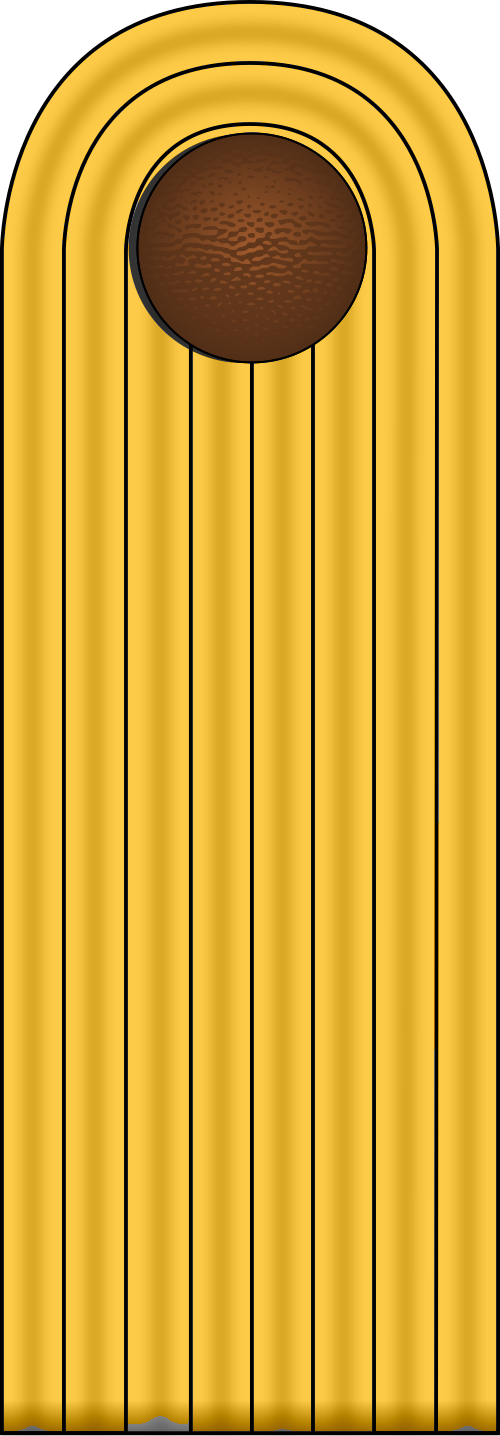
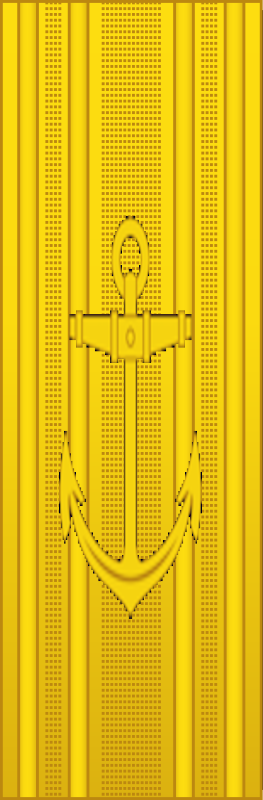
Rank group	General / flag officers					Senior officers			Junior officers
1827–1856
1827–1856	قَبْطَان پَاشَا; Kaptan paşa	بَحْرِيَّة فَرِيقِی; Bâhriye ferîki		بَحْرِيَّة مِيرلِيوَاسِی; Bâhriye mirlivası	اُچْ آمْبَارْلِی سُوَارِيسِی; Üç ambarlı süvarisi	مِيرَلاَی; Miralay	قَايْمَقَام; Kaymakam	بِينبَاشِی; Binbaşı	قُول آغَاسِی; Kolağası		يُوزبَاشِی; Yüzbaşı	مُلَازِم; Mülâzım
1856–1861
1856–1861	رَئِيس پَاشَا; Reis paşa	فَرِيق پَاشَا; Ferîk paşa		لِوَاء پَاشَا; Liva paşa	اُچْ آمْبَارْلِی سُوَارِيسِی; Üç ambarlı süvarisi	مِيرَلاَی; Miralay	قَايْمَقَام; Kaymakam	بِينبَاشِی; Binbaşı			بُويْرُلْتُلُو قَبْطَان; Buyrultulu kaptan
1861–1876
1861–1876	رَئِيس پَاشَا; Reis paşa	فَرِيق پَاشَا; Ferîk paşa		لِوَاء پَاشَا; Liva paşa	اُچْ آمْبَارْلِی سُوَارِيسِی; Üç ambarlı süvarisi	مِيرَلاَی; Miralay	قَايْمَقَام; Kaymakam	بِينبَاشِی; Binbaşı			بُويْرُلْتُلُو قَبْطَان; Buyrultulu kaptan	مُلَازِم; Mülâzım
1876–1909
1876–1909	مُشِير; Müşîr	فَرِيق; Ferîk		مِيرلِيوَا; Mirliva		مِيرَلاَی; Miralay	قَايْمَقَام; Kaymakam	بِينَباشِی; Binbaşı	كُولْ أُول; Kolevvel	كُولْ صَانِی; Kolsânî	يُوزبَاشِی; Yüzbaşı	مُلَازِمِ اوَّل; Mülâzım-ı evvel	مُلَازِمِ ثَانِی; Mülâzım-ı sânî
1909–1916
1909–1916	مُشِير أَمِيرَال; Müşîr amiral	أَمِيرَال; Amiral	فِيس أَمِيرَال; Vice amiral	لِوَاء أَمِيرَال; Liva amiral	قُومُودُور; Komodor	قَلْيُون قَبْطَانِی; Kalyon kaptanı	فِرْقَاطَيْن قَبْطَانِی; Fırkateyn kaptanı	قُورْوِيت قَبْطَانِی; Korvet kaptanı		بِيرِينْجِی صِنِفْ يُوزبَاشِی; Birinci sınıf yüzbaşı	يُوزبَاشِی; Yüzbaşı	مُلَازِمِ اوَّل; Mülâzım-ı evvel	مُلَازِمِ ثَانِی; Mülâzım-ı sânî	مُهَنْدِس; Mühendis
1916–1922
1916–1922	مُشِير أَمِيرَال; Müşîr amiral	أَمِيرَال; Amiral	فِيس أَمِيرَال; Vice amiral	لِوَاء أَمِيرَال; Liva amiral	قُومُودُور; Komodor	قَلْيُون قَبْطَانِی; Kalyon kaptanı	فِرْقَاطَيْن قَبْطَانِی; Fırkateyn kaptanı	قُورْوِيت قَبْطَانِی; Korvet kaptanı		بِيرِينْجِی صِنِفْ يُوزبَاشِی; Birinci sınıf yüzbaşı	يُوزبَاشِی; Yüzbaşı	مُلَازِمِ اوَّل; Mülâzım-ı evvel	مُلَازِمِ ثَانِی; Mülâzım-ı sânî	مُهَنْدِس; Mühendis
Rank group	General / flag officers					Senior officers			Junior officers

==== Technical officer ranks ====
Rank group	General / flag officers	Senior officers			Junior officers
1876–1909
1876–1909		أجزاجی; Eczacı (Pharmacist)	جراح; Cerrah (Surgeon)	اطباء; Etibbâ (Medical Personnels)
Equivalent		Unknown

=== Other ranks ===
The rank insignia of non-commissioned officers and enlisted personnel.

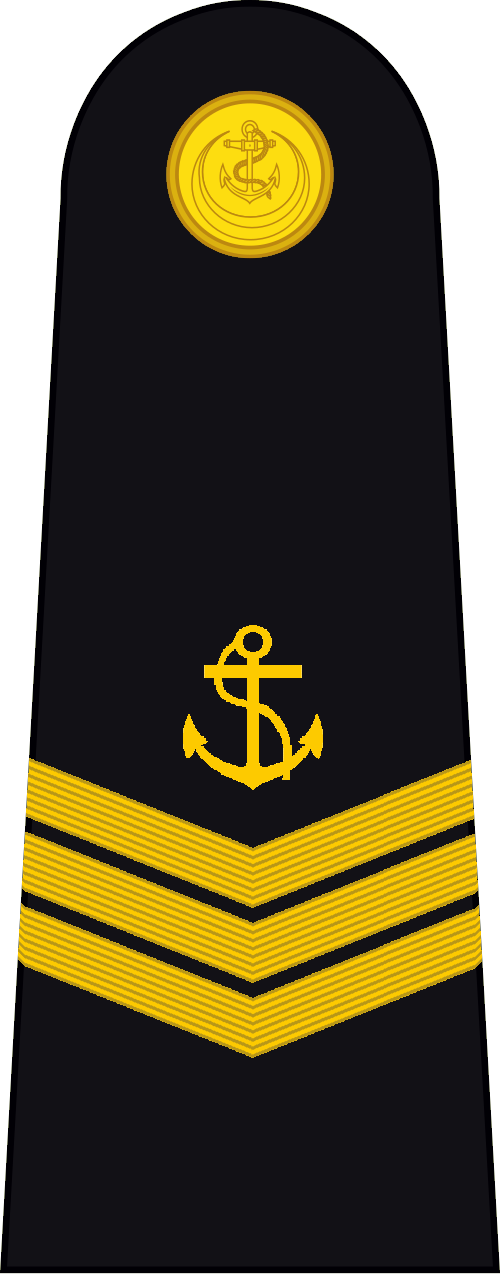
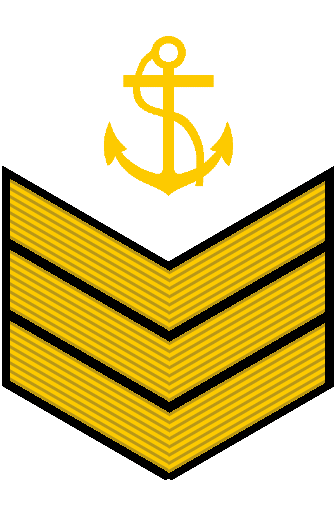
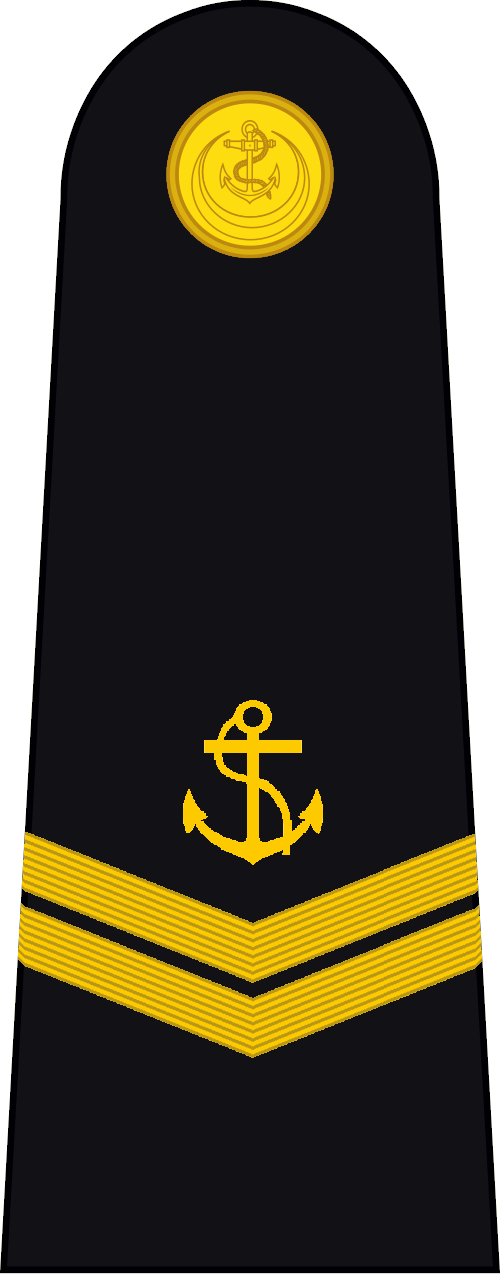
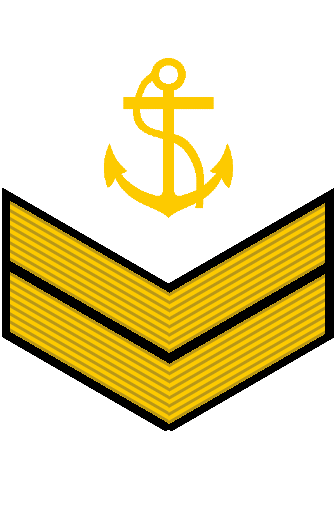
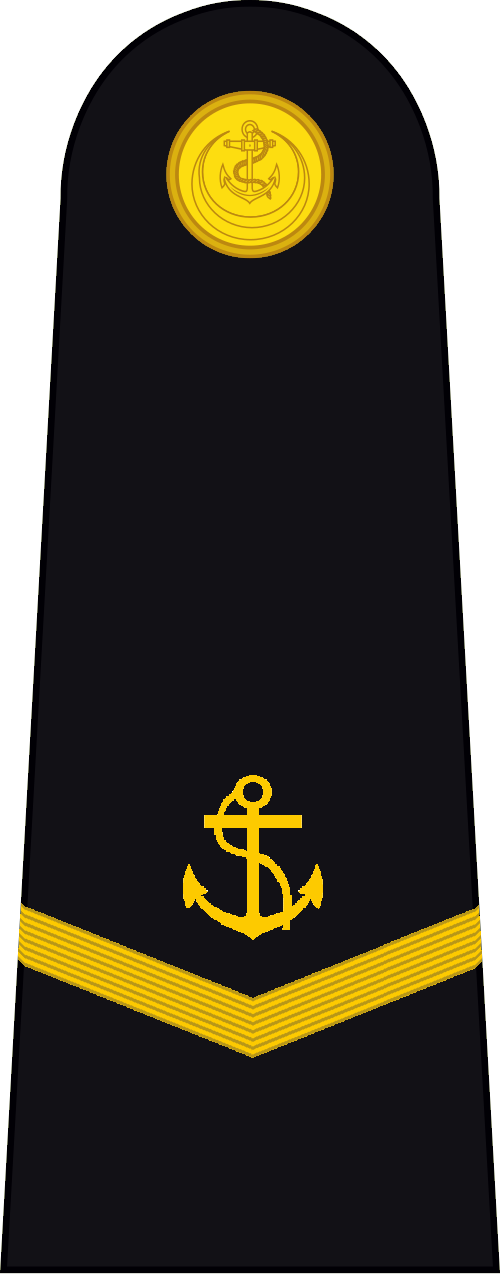
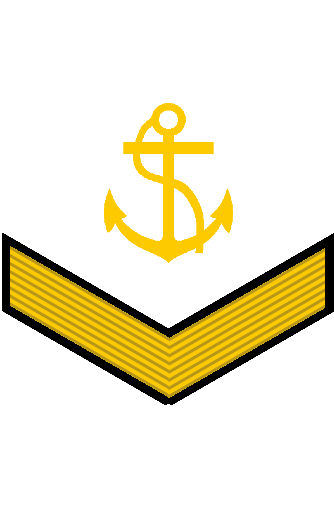
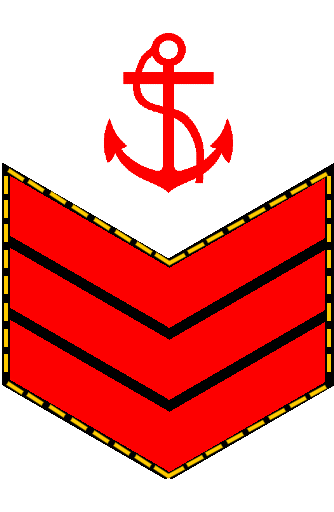
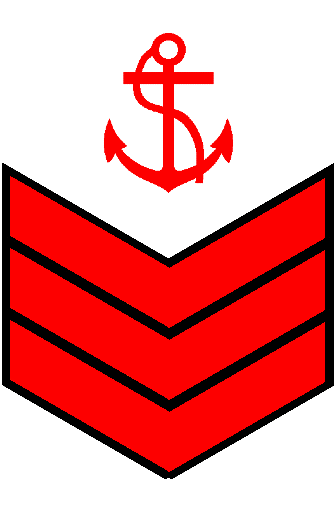
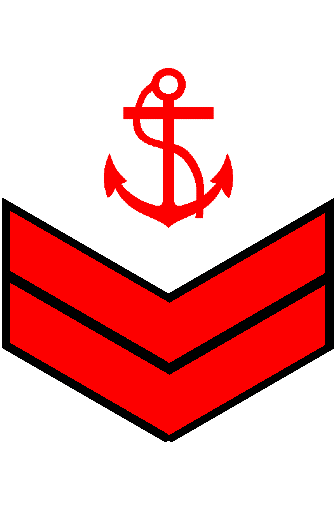
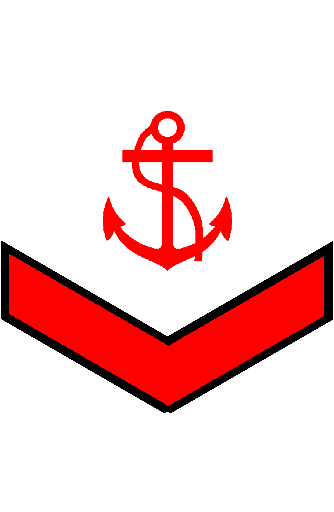
Rank group	Senior non-commissioned officers				Non-commissioned officers			Enlisted
1827–1856										No insignia
1827–1856							چاووش; Çavuş		اُونباشی; Onbaşı	نَفَر; Nefer
1856–1876										No insignia
1856–1876						باش چاووش; Başçavuş	چاووش; Çavuş	بُولُوك اَمينی; Bölük emini	اُونباشی; Onbaşı	نَفَر; Nefer
1876–1914										No insignia
1876–1914	سِرْگِدِيكْلِی; Sergedikli	گِدِيكْلِی اَوَّل; Gedikli evvel	گِدِيكْلِی ثَانِی; Gedikli sânî	گِدِيكْلِی ثَالِث; Gedikli sâlis		باش چاووش; Başçavuş	چاووش; Çavuş	بُولُوك اَمِينی; Bölük emini	اُونباشی; Onbaşı	نَفَر; Nefer
1914–1922										No insignia
1914–1922	بِيرِينْجِی صِنِفْ گِدِيكْلِی; Birinci sınıf gedikli		اِيكِينْجِی صِنِفْ گِدِيكْلِی; İkinci sınıf gedikli	اُچُونْجِی صِنِفْ گِدِيكْلِی; Üçüncü sınıf gedikli	گِدِيكْلِی نَامْزَدِی; Gedikli namzedi	ماکینه باشچاووشی; Başçavuş	چاووش; Çavuş		اُونباشی; Onbaşı	نَفَر; Nefer

==== Technical ranks ====
Rank group	Non-commissioned officers
1876–1914
1876–1914	سرتوب; Sertob (Chief Gunner)	سردومن; Serdümen (Helmsman)	آتشچی اول; Ateşçi evvel (First Stoker)	آتشچی ثانی; Ateşçi sani (Second Stoker)
Equivalent	Başçavuş (Sergeant Major)			Çavuş (Sergeant)

== See also ==
- Military ranks of Turkey
